= List of wars involving Algeria =

This is a list of wars involving the People's Democratic Republic of Algeria and its predecessor states.

Algerian defeat
Algerian victory
Another result (e.g: Treaty, status quo ante bellum, indecisive/stalemate/withdrawal etc... or indecisive)

== Regency of Algiers (1515–1830) ==
Conflict	Combatant 1	Combatant 2	Result for Algeria and its Allies
Algiers Expedition (1516) Location:Algiers	Barbarossa; Kingdom of Kuku	Spanish Empire	Algerian victory: Spanish attack repulsed
Algiers Expedition (1519) Location:Algiers	Beylerbeylik of Algiers	Spanish Empire	Algerian victory: Spanish attack repulsed
Fall of Tlemcen (1519) Location:Tlemcen, Algeria	Beylerbeylik of Algiers	Spanish Empire: Zayyanid Sultanate	Spanish victory
Capture of Peñón of Algiers (1529) Part of the Algero-Spanish Wars, and the establishment of the Regency of Algiers Location:Algiers	Beylerbeylik of Algiers	Spanish Empire	Beylerbeylikal victory: Algiers secured by Barbarossa
Campaign of Cherchell (1531) Location:Cherchell	Beylerbeylik of Algiers	Empire of Charles V: Spanish Empire; Genoa Republic of Genoa; Kingdom of France	Algerian victory
Ottoman–Venetian War (1537–1540) Part of the Ottoman–Venetian wars Part of the Algero-Spanish Wars Location: Mediterranean Sea	Beylerbeylik of Algiers	Holy League: Republic of Venice; Spanish Empire: Kingdom of Naples; Kingdom of Sicily; Republic of Genoa; Papal States (Sovereign Military Order of Malta) Knights of Malta	Ottoman victory: A treaty or "Capitulation" was signed between Venice and the Ottoman Empire to end the war on 2 October 1540.; In the period between the start of the Second Ottoman–Venetian War in 1499 and the end of this war in 1540, the Ottoman Empire made significant advances in the Dalmatian hinterland – it didn't occupy the Venetian cities, but it took the Kingdom of Hungary's Croatian possessions between Skradin and Karin, eliminating them as a buffer zone between the Ottoman and Venetian territory. The economy of the Venetian cities in Dalmatia, severely impacted by the Turkish occupation of the hinterland in the previous war, recovered and held steady even throughout this war.
Algiers expedition (1541) Part of the Ottoman–Habsburg wars Part of the Algero-Spanish Wars Location: Algiers Siege of Algiers in 1541. Engraving of 1555.	Beylerbeylik of Algiers	Holy Roman Empire: Milan; Spanish Empire: Naples; Sicily; Republic of Genoa; Republic of Venice; Duchy of Savoy; Papal States	Algerine victory: Charles V's retreat to the port of Bougie; Charles V was the leader of the Holy League for the conquest of Algiers
Italian War of 1542–1546 Part of the Anglo-French Wars & Italian Wars Part of the Algero-Spanish War Location: Western Europe The siege of Nice by a Franco-Ottoman fleet in 1543 (drawing by Toselli, after an engraving by Aeneas Vico)	Kingdom of France; Ottoman Empire Beylerbeylik of Algiers	Holy Roman Empire: Brandenburg; Saxony; Spanish Empire; Kingdom of England	Inconclusive: Treaty of Crépy; Treaty of Ardres
Expedition to Mostaganem (1543) Location:Mostaganem	Beylerbeylik of Algiers	Spanish Empire	Algerian victory: Spanish attack repulsed
Expedition to Mostaganem (1547) Location:Mostaganem	Beylerbeylik of Algiers	Spanish Empire	Algerian victory: Spanish attack repulsed
Campaign of Tlemcen (1551) Part of the Algero-Spanish Wars Location: Tlemcen The troops of the regency of Algiers allied to the kingdom of Beni Abbes marching towards Oranie (19th century engraving)	Beylerbeylik of Algiers; Kingdom of Ait Abbas	Spanish Empire; Saadi sultanate	Algerian victory: The Moulouya river is set as the border
Campaign of Tlemcen (1552) Location: Tlemcen	Beylerbeylik of Algiers	Saadi sultanate	Algerian victory The Moulouya river imposed as the border
Capture of Fez (1554) Location: Fez, Morocco	Beylerbeylik of Algiers; Kingdom of Kuku	Saadi sultanate	Algerian victory
Campaign of Tlemcen (1557) Location: Tlemcen	Beylerbeylik of Algiers	Saadi sultanate	Algerian victory
Expedition to Mostaganem (1558) Location:Mostaganem	Beylerbeylik of Algiers	Spanish Empire	Algerian victory
Campaign of Tlemcen (1560) Location: Tlemcen	Beylerbeylik of Algiers	Saadi sultanate	Algerian victory
Rebellion of the Alpujarras (1568–1571) Part of the Algero-Spanish War Location: Spain Principal centres of the Morisco Revolt	Muslims of Granada; Beylerbeylik of Algiers	Spanish Empire	Spanish victory: Mass expulsion of most Muslims in Granada; Resettlement of Granada with Catholic settlers
Franco-Algerian war (1609–1628)	Beylerbeylik of Algiers	Kingdom of France	Algerian victory
Tunisian–Algerian War (1628); Part of the Tunisian–Algerian Wars; Location: Algeria, Tunisia	Pashalik of Algiers	Beylik of Tunis	Algerian victory: The border continues to be fixed further by the wadi Mellègue.
Cretan War (1645–1669); Part of:Ottoman–Venetian wars Location: Candia, Crete, Dalmatia and Aegean Sea	Ottoman Empire: Regency of Algiers; Ottoman Tripolitania; Ottoman Tunis	Republic of Venice; Knights of Malta; Papal States; France; Greek revolutionaries; Maniots	Ottoman victory
Djidjelli expedition (1664) Location: Jijel Combat between French and Algerian ships	Pashalik of Algiers; Kingdom of Ait Abbas; Kingdom of Kuku	Kingdom of France; Knights Hospitaller	Algerian victory: France abandons Djidjelli

== Deylikal period (1671–1830) ==
Conflict	Combatant 1	Combatant 2	Result for Algeria and its Allies
French-Algerian War (1681–1688) Location: Algeria, Mediterranean Sea Bombardment of Algiers by the fleet of Admiral Duquesne in 1682	Deylik of Algiers	Kingdom of France; Knights Hospitaller	Stalemate
Morean War (1684–1699) Part of the Ottoman–Venetian wars Location: Peloponnese, southern Epirus, Central Greece, Aegean Sea, Montenegro View of the fortress and harbour of Modon in 1688	Ottoman Empire; Deylik of Algiers	Republic of Venice; Holy Roman Empire (Sovereign Military Order of Malta) Knights of Malta; Duchy of Savoy; Papal States; Knights of St. Stephen; Greek rebels Montenegrin	Venetian victory: Morea ceded to Venice; Venetian gains in inland Dalmatia
Moulouya War (1692) Part of the Conflicts between the Regency of Algiers and Morocco Location: Moulouya River, Morocco Battle of Moulouya in 1692 involded Algeria and Morocco.	Deylik of Algiers	Sultanate of Morocco	Algerian victory: Oujda experiences more than 100 years of rule under the Regency of Algiers
Siege of Oran (1693) Part of the Conflicts between the Regency of Algiers and Morocco Location: Oran, Algeria	Spanish Empire: Spanish Oran; Deylik of Algiers	Sultanate of Morocco	Spanish-Algerian victory
Tunisian-Algerian War of 1694 Part of the Tunisian–Algerian Wars Location: Tunisia The fronts and battles during the Tunisian-Algerian war (1694)	Deylik of Algiers; Tripolitania	Tunisia	Algerian-Tripolitanian victory: All of Tunisia occupied (until 1695).; Moroccan-Tunisian alliance.
Maghrebi war (1699–1702) Part of the Tunisian–Algerian Wars Part of the Conflicts between the Regency of Algiers and Morocco Location: Algeria, Morocco, and Tunisia	Deylik of Algiers	Tunisia; Sultanate of Morocco; Tripolitania	Algerian Victory: Moroccan and Tunisian forces routed
Tunisian–Algerian War of 1705 Part of the Tunisian–Algerian Wars; Location: Tunisia	Deylik of Algiers	Beylik of Tunis	Inconclusive: Founding of the Husseinite Dynasty in Tunisia by Al-Husayn I ibn Ali; Algerian retreat
Oran Expedition (1707) Part of the Conflicts between the Regency of Algiers and Morocco Location: Oran, Algeria	Deylik of Algiers	Sultanate of Morocco	Algerian victory
Siege of Oran (1707–1708) Part of the Algero-Spanish War Location: Algeria The statue of Our Lady of Santa Cruz on the Fort of Santa Cruz in Oran	Deylik of Algiers	Spanish Empire	Algerian victory: Spanish Oran Seized by Algiers
Spanish-Algerian War (1732) Location: Oran	Deylik of Algiers	Spanish Empire	Spanish victory: Spanish Oran re-established
Tunisian–Algerian Wars 1735 Part of the Tunisian–Algerian Wars Location: Tunisia	Deylik of Algiers	Beylik of Tunis	Algerian victory: Abu l-Hasan Ali I proclaimed bey of Tunis; Tunisian commitment to pay an annual tribute of 50,000 piastres to Algiers
Tunisian–Algerian Wars 1756 Part of the Tunisian–Algerian Wars Location: Tunisia	Deylik of Algiers; Loyalists of Muhammad	Beylik of Tunis (Sovereign Military Order of Malta) Knights Hospitaller	Algerian and loyalist victory: Muhammad I ar-Rashid proclaimed bey of Tunis; Bey's commitment to pay a tribute (oil to light the Algerian mosques)
Danish-Algerian War (1769–1772) Part of the Algeria-European War Location: Mediterranean Sea	Deylik of Algiers	Denmark–Norway	Algerian victory Christian VII of Denmark
Spanish-Algerian war (1775-1785) Part of the Algero-Spanish War Location: Algiers Map of the Spanish attack on Algiers in 1775	Deylik of Algiers	Spanish Empire; Tuscany; Kingdom of Sicily; Kingdom of Naples; Malta; Portugal	Algerian victory
American–Algerian War (1785–1795); Location: Mediterranean Sea and Atlantic Ocean	Deylik of Algiers	United States	Algerian victory: United States agrees to pay an annual tribute of $21,600 to Algiers; Establishment of the United States Navy
Russo-Turkish War (1787–1792) Part of the Algeria-European War Part of the Russo-Ottoman Wars Location: Eastern Europe Siege of Ochakov 1788, by Polish painter January Suchodolski	Ottoman Empire; Deylik of Algiers	Russian Empire Black Sea Cossacks Montenegro Serbian Free Corps	Russian victory: No major repercussions in Algiers
Reconquest of Oran and Mers el-Kébir (1790-1792) Part of the Algero-Spanish Wars Location: Oran and Mers-el-Kébir	Deylik of Algiers	Spanish Empire	Algerian victory: Spain abandons Oran and Mers-el-Kébir
Tunisian–Algerian War (1807); Part of: Tunisian–Algerian Wars; Location: Tunisia	Deylik of Algiers: Beylik of Constantine	Beylik of Tunis	Tunisian victory: Algerian victory in Constantine; Failure to invade Tunisia
Algerian-Tunisian naval war (1811)	Deylik of Algiers: Algerian Navy	Beylik of Tunis	Algerian victory
Tunisian–Algerian War (1813)	Deylik of Algiers	Beylik of Tunis	Peace Treaty: Tunisian Victory and the invasion repelled; Political instability in Tunisia after the death of Hammouda Pasha; Algerian Military Victory
Second Barbary war (1815); Location: Mediterranean Sea	Deylik of Algiers	United States	American victory: Freedom of movement in the Mediterranean for American ships
Bombardment of Algiers (1816); Location: Algiers Bombardment of Algiers 1816, George Chambers	Deylik of Algiers	British Empire; Dutch Empire	Anglo-Dutch victory Sketch showing the positions of the fleet during the bombardment Bombardment of Algiers, painted by Martinus Schouman
Greek War of Independence (1821–1829) Location: Greece Clockwise: The camp of Georgios Karaiskakis at Phaliro, the burning of an Ottoman frigate by a Greek fire ship, the Battle of Navarino and Ibrahim Pasha of Egypt at the Third Siege of Missolonghi	Ottoman; Deylik of Algiers; Tripolitania; Egypt; Tunisia	1821: Filiki Eteria; Sacred Band; Greek Revolutionaries; After 1822: Greece; Military support: (Greece) Philhellenes; Serbian Revolutionaries; Romanian Revolutionaries (Note: 1821); Russian Empire (Note: From 1826); Kingdom of France; United Kingdom; Diplomatic support: Haiti (Note: First nation to recognize the independence of Greece.)	Greek independence: Establishment of the First Hellenic Republic (1822–1832); Start of the Russo-Turkish War (1828–1829); London Protocol; Treaty of Constantinople; Establishment of the Kingdom of Greece (1832); Start of the First Egyptian-Ottoman War; Map showing the original territory of the Kingdom of Greece as laid down in the Treaty of 1832 (in dark blue)

== French Algeria (1830–1962) ==
Conflict	Combatant 1	Combatant 2	Result for Algeria and its Allies
French conquest of Algeria (1830–1903) Part of the Algeria-European War Location: Algeria The Siege of Constantine by Horace Vernet, 1838	Regency of Algiers: Constantine; Titteri; Oran; Emirate of Mascara; Kingdom of Ait Abbas; Sultanate of Tuggurt; Kel Ahaggar (Libya) Awlad Sidi Shaykh Support: Morocco (until 1844)	Kingdom of France (1830–1848); French Second Republic (1848–1852); Second French Empire (1852–1870); French Third Republic (1870 onward): French Algeria; Support: Morocco (1847)	French victory Pacification of Algeria Chronological map of French Algeria's evolution
Algerian War (1954–1962) Part of the Cold War and the decolonisation of Africa Location: French Algeria Collage of the French war in Algeria	FLN; MNA; PCA	French Fourth Republic (1954–1958); French Fifth Republic (1958–1962); La Main Rouge; MPC; ANPA; FAF (1960–61); OAS (1961–62)	Algerian victory: Independence of Algeria from France; End of the French colonial empire; Collapse of the Fourth French Republic and establishment of the Fifth French Republic

== French Third Republic (1830–1940) ==
Conflict	France & allies	France's opposition	Outcome
Paris Commune (1871) Location: Paris	(France) French Third Republic	Communards; National Guards	Third Republic victory
Mokrani Revolt (1871–1872) Location: Algeria	France	Algerian rebels: Kingdom of Ait Abbas; Sultanate of Tuggurt; Algerian Zawiyas; Algerian peasantry	French victory
Annexation of the Leeward Islands (1880–1897) Location: Society Islands	France; Tahiti (French protectorate)	Raiatea-Tahaa; Huahine; Bora Bora	French victory
French conquest of Tunisia (1881) Location: Tunisia	France	Beylik of Tunis	French victory: Tunisia becomes a French protectorate
Mandingo Wars (1883–1898) Location: West Africa	France	Wassoulou Empire	French victory
First Madagascar expedition (1883–1885) Location: Madagascar	France	Merina Kingdom	French victory
Sino-French War (1884–1885) Location: Southeast mainland China, Taiwan, northern Vietnam: Battle of Fuzhou; Kep Campaign; Battle of Shipu; Battle of Zhenhai; Lạng Sơn Campaign; Siege of Tuyên Quang; Battle of Hòa Mộc; Battle of Phu Lam Tao; Battle of Bang Bo; Retreat from Lạng Sơn; Pescadores Campaign	France	China; Black Flag Army; Nguyễn dynasty	Both sides declared victory: Limited "victory" for Qing forces on land (China won one battle at the end before suing for peace); Defeat of Qing forces on Taiwan and surrounding islands; Collapse of Ferry's government in late March due to public opinion against the war; Treaty of Tientsin; China officially recognizes French domination over Vietnam
Tonkin Campaign (1883–1886) Location: Northern Vietnam	France	Qing dynasty Black Flag Army; Nguyễn dynasty	French victory: French protectorate over Tonkin and Annam
First Franco-Dahomean War (1890) Location: Ouémé Department of modern Benin	France	Dahomey	French victory: Dahomey recognizes Porto-Novo as a French protectorate and gives up customs rights to Cotonou in exchange for yearly payment
Second Franco-Dahomean War (1892–1894) Location: Ouémé Department and Zou Department of modern Benin: Battle of Abomey	France	Dahomey	French victory: Dahomey conquered and incorporated as a French protectorate
Franco-Siamese conflict (1893) Location: French Indochina, Siam	French Republic: French Indochina	Siam	French victory: Entente Cordiale; Laos ceded to French Indochina
First Italo-Ethiopian War (1894–1896) Location: Eritrea and Ethiopia	Ethiopia; Support: Russia; France Eritrean rebels	Italy: Italian Eritrea	Ethiopian victory: Treaty of Addis Ababa
Second Madagascar expedition (1894–1895) Location: Madagascar	France	Merina Kingdom	French victory
Cretan Revolt (1897–1898) Location: Crete	Cretan revolutionaries Kingdom of Greece; British Empire; France (Kingdom of Italy) Italy; Russian Empire; Austria-Hungary (until April 12, 1898); German Empire (until March 16, 1898)	Ottoman Empire	French victory: Establishment of the Cretan State.; Withdraw of Ottoman forces from Crete.
Boxer Rebellion (1899-1901) Location: North China, Yellow Sea	Eight-Nation Alliance British Empire Russia Japan France Germany United States Italy Austria-Hungary: Netherlands; Spain; Belgium; (Qing dynasty) Mutual Defence Pact of Southeast China (after 1900)	Boxer movement; Qing dynasty (after 1900)	Eight-Nation Alliance victory: Boxer Protocol
Rabih War (1899–1901): Battle of Togbao; Battle of Kousséri; Location: West Africa	France	Kanem–Bornu Empire	French victory
1904–1905 uprising in Madagascar (1904–1905) Location: Madagascar	France	Rebels	French victory: Rebellion suppressed
Ouaddai War (1909–1911) Location: Ouaddai Empire	France	Ouaddai Empire	French victory: Annexation of Ouaddai Empire
French conquest of Morocco (1911–1934) Location: North Africa	France: Morocco	Zaian Confederation; Varying other Berber tribes	French victory
Zaian War (1914–1921) Location: French protectorate of Morocco: Battle of El Herri	France: Morocco	Zaian Confederation; Varying other Berber tribes Supported during the First World War by the Central Powers	French victory
First World War (1914–1918) Location: Europe, Africa, Asia, Middle East, the Pacific Islands, and coast of North and South America	Allied Powers France; British Empire: United Kingdom; Canada; Newfoundland; Australia; New Zealand; India; South Africa; Russian Empire; United States; Italy; Japan; China; Serbia; Montenegro; Romania; Belgium; Greece; Portugal; Brazil	Central Powers Germany; Austria-Hungary; Ottoman Empire; Bulgaria	Allied victory: End of the German, Russian, Ottoman, and Austro-Hungarian empires; Formation of new countries in Europe and the Middle East; Transfer of German colonies and regions of the former Ottoman Empire to other powers; Establishment of the League of Nations
Volta-Bani War (1915–1917) Location: Burkino Faso, Mali	France: French West Africa	Marka, Bwa, Lela, Nuni, and Bobo people	French victory
Kaocen revolt (1916–1917) Location: Northern Niger	France: French West Africa	Tuareg guerrillas	French victory
Thái Nguyên uprising (1917–1918) Location: Northern Vietnam	France	Vietnamese rebels	French victory: Uprising suppressed.
Occupation of Constantinople (1918–1923) Location: Istanbul	United Kingdom; France; Italy; Greece; United States; Japan	Ottoman Empire	Temporary occupation
November 1918 insurgency in Alsace-Lorraine Location: Alsace-Lorraine	French Third Republic	Alsace-Lorraine Soviet Republic	Third Republic victory: Alsace-Lorraine annexed by France
Hungarian-Romanian War (1918–1919) Location: Hungary, and Transylvania	Romania; Supported by: France Czechoslovakia	Hungarian Republic (until 21 March 1919); Soviet Hungary; Supported by: Soviet Russia	Romanian victory
Franco-Turkish War (1918–1921) Location: Cilicia and Upper Mesopotamia: Battle of Marash; Battle of Urfa; Siege of Aintab; Karboğazı ambush; Kaç Kaç incident; Battle of Kovanbaşı; Battle of Kanlı Geçit; Battle of Fadıl	France: (Armenia) French Armenian Legion	Grand National Assembly: Kuva-yi Milliye	French loss: French influence in Anatolia is repelled; Southern Anatolia ceded to Turkey; Cilicia Peace Treaty; Treaty of Ankara; Treaty of Lausanne
Allied intervention in the Russian Civil War (1918–1920) Location: Russia, Mongolia, and Iran	(Russia) White Movement; British Empire: United Kingdom; Canada; Australia; India; South Africa; United States; France; Japan; Czechoslovakia; Greece; Estonia; Serbia; Italy; Poland; Romania; China	Russian SFSR; Far Eastern Republic; Latvian SSR; Ukrainian SSR; Commune of Estonia; Mongolian Communists	Allied withdrawal: Allied withdrawal from Russia; Bolshevik victory over White Army
German Revolution of 1918–1919 (1918–1919) Location: German Empire	1918–1919: Weimar Republic: Reichswehr; Freikorps; Der Stahlhelm; Social Democratic Party of Germany; Supported by: France	FSR Germany; Supported by: Russian SFSR	Weimar victory
Hungarian–Czechoslovak War (1918–1919) Location: Slovakia, Carpathian Ruthenia, Hungary	Czechoslovakia; Supported by: France; Romania	Hungarian Republic (until 21 March 1919); Soviet Hungary (from 21 March 1919); Supported by: Soviet Russia	Czechoslovak victory: Hungarian retreat after diplomatic negotiations with the Entente; Formation and then dissolution of the Slovak Soviet Republic
1919 Luxembourgish rebellion (January 1919) Location: Luxembourg	French Third Republic; Grand Duchy of Luxembourg	Comité de Salut Public (Luxembourg); Republic of Luxembourg	French and Luxembourgish monarchist victory: Luxembourgish republican and pro-Belgian rebellion suppressed (10 January 1919)
Polish-Soviet War (1919–1921) Location: Central and Eastern Europe	Poland; Belarusian PR; Latvia (Note: Battle of Daugavpils); Ukrainian People's Republic (Note: After 1920); Supported by: France; Hungarian Republic; Romania; Russian Whites; United Kingdom (Note: Volunteers); United States	Russian SFSR; Byelorussian SSR; Polrewkom; Ukrainian SSR	Polish victory
Bender Uprising (1919) Location: Tighina, Kingdom of Romania (present day Bender, Moldova)	France; Romania	Red Guards; Ukrainian SSR	Franco-Romanian victory
Franco-Syrian War (1920) Location: Syria: Alawite Revolt of 1919; Hananu Revolt; Battle of Maysalun; Capture of Damascus (1920)	France: French West Africa	Arab Kingdom of Syria: Arab militias	French victory: Establishment of French Mandate of Syria King Faisal expelled to Mandatory Iraq
Rif War (1920–1927) Location: Morocco	Spain; France (1925–1926); Jebala tribes	Republic of the Rif; Jebala tribes	Franco-Spanish victory: Dissolution of the Republic of the Rif
Great Syrian Revolt (1925–1927) Location: French Mandate for Syria and the Lebanon Damascus in flames as the result of the French air raid on October 18, 1925.: Capture of Salkhad; Battle of al-Kafr; Battle of al-Mazraa; Battle of al-Musayfirah; 1925 Hama uprising; Battle of Rashaya; Battle of al-Mazraa	France: Syria; Lebanon	Syrian rebels	French victory
Kongo-Wara rebellion (1928–1931) Location: French Equatorial Africa, French Cameroon	France: French Equatorial Africa; French Cameroon; Fula people Co-belligerents: Gbaya chiefdoms	Gbaya people and clans Co-belligerents: Mbum people Mbai people Pana people Yangere people Mbimou people Goundi people	French victory
Yên Bái mutiny (1930) Location: Vietnam	France: French Indochina	Việt Nam Quốc Dân Đảng	French victory: Uprising crushed VNQDĐ severely damaged by deaths and arrests, jailings and executions by French authorities
Second World War (1939–1945) Location: Europe, Pacific Ocean, Atlantic Ocean, Southeast Asia, East Asia, Middle East, Mediterranean, North Africa, Oceania, North and South America	Allied Powers United States; Soviet Union; United Kingdom; China; Free France; Poland; Canada; Australia; New Zealand; India; South Africa; Yugoslavia; Greece; Denmark; Norway; Netherlands; Belgium; Luxembourg; Czechoslovakia; Brazil; Mexico	Axis Powers Germany; Japan; Italy; Hungary; Romania; Bulgaria; Croatia; Slovakia; Finland; Thailand; Manchukuo; Mengjiang	Allied victory: Collapse of the Third Reich; Fall of Japanese and Italian Empires; Creation of the United Nations; Emergence of the United States and the Soviet Union as superpowers; Beginning of the Cold War

== Vichy France (1940–1944) ==
Conflict	France & allies	France's opposition	Outcome
Franco-Thai War (1940–1941) Location: French Indochina: Battle of Ko Chang	Vichy France: French Indochina	Thailand	Inconclusive: Japanese-mediated ceasefire; On Japanese decision, disputed territories in French Indochina ceded by France to Thailand

== People's Democratic Republic of Algeria (1962–present) ==
Conflict	Combatant 1	Combatant 2	Result for Algeria and its Allies
Sand War (1963–1964) Part of the Arab Cold War and the Cold War Location: Algeria Border Algeria and Morocco	Algeria; Support: Egypt; Cuba	Morocco; Support: France	Military stalemate: The closing of the border south of Figuig, Morocco/Béni Ounif, Algeria.; Morocco abandoned its attempts to control Béchar and Tindouf after OAU mediation.; Demilitarized zone established.; No territorial changes.
Yom Kippur War (1973)	Egypt; Syria; Expeditionary forces Saudi Arabia Algeria Jordan Libya Iraq Kuwait Tunisia Morocco Cuba North Korea	Israel	Israeli military victory: At the final ceasefire: Egyptian forces held 1,200 km^{2} (460 sq mi) on the eastern bank of the canal.; Israeli forces held 1,600 km^{2} (620 sq mi) on the western bank of the canal.; Israeli forces held 500 km^{2} (193 sq mi) of the Syrian Bashan region of the Golan Heights.
Western Sahara War (1975–1976) Location: Western Sahara Map of the Western Sahara; the red line is the military berm built by Morocco	Sahrawi Arab Democratic Republic; Algeria	Morocco; Mauritania	Inconclusive: Spanish withdrawal under the Madrid Accords (1976); Mauritanian retreat and withdrawal of territorial claims; Military Stalemate; Ceasefire agreed on between the Polisario Front and Morocco (1991)
Algerian Civil War (1992–2002) Location: Algeria Algerian military deployed in the streets of Algiers after the military coup against the Islamists, 12 January 1992	Government of Algeria; Minor involvement: Egypt; Tunisia; France; European Union; South Africa	Islamic Salvation Front loyalists Minor involvement: Morocco; Libya (until 1995); Saudi Arabia (pre-war); Iran (alleged); Saudi private donors Armed Islamic Group (from 1993); Minor involvement: Sudan (alleged); Iran (alleged); Egyptian Islamic Jihad (until 1995) Salafist Group for Preaching and Combat (from 1998); Minor involvement: Al-Qaeda	Algerian government victory: Banishment of Islamic Salvation Front; Charter for Peace and National Reconciliation
Insurgency in the Maghreb (2002–present) (2002–present) Part of the war on terror and the War against the Islamic State Location: Maghreb, Sahara desert Map showing Salafist Group for Preaching and Combat area of operations (pink), member states of the Pan Sahel Initiative (dark blue), and members of the Trans-Saharan Counterterrorism Initiative (dark and light blue) as of 2011.	Algeria; Mauritania; Tunisia; Libya; Morocco Multi-national coalitions: (United Nations) MINUSMA (until 2023); AFISMA (from 2013); (European Union) EUTM Mali; Supported by: France; United States (AFRICOM); United Kingdom; Sweden; Netherlands; Germany; Denmark; Portugal; Czech Republic; Russia; Turkey	Al-Qaeda and allies: AQIM (from 2007); Ansar al-Sharia (Tunisia) (from 2011); Uqba ibn Nafi Brigade (2012–14); GSPC (until 2007); Ansar al-Sharia (Libya) (2012–17); Salafia Jihadia Islamic State (from 2014): (Islamic State) Libyan Provinces; (Islamic State) Wilayat al-Jazair; (Islamic State) Sahel Province; Uqba ibn Nafi Brigade (from 2014)	Ongoing: Insurgency in Algeria spreads through the Maghreb and in the Sahel; Islamic State and Al-Qaeda are defeated in Algeria, fighters flee into the Sahel; US-led Operation Enduring Freedom – Trans Sahara initiated in 2007; Islamists capture northern Mali in 2012, engaging in a civil war; Chaambi Operations and IS insurgency in Tunisia; IS captures territory in the Second Libyan Civil War, largely fought back by 2016; Al-Qaeda–Islamic State conflict
War in the Sahel (2011-present) Part of the war on terror, spillover of the Insurgency in the Maghreb (2002–present) and the War against the Islamic State Location: Sahel (mainly Mali, Burkina Faso and Niger), with spillovers in Benin, Togo, Mauritania, Algeria and Ivory Coast Map showing areas where the Islamic State in the Greater Sahara was active in 2021	Alliance of Sahel States: Mali; Niger; Burkina Faso; Benin; Togo (Note: JNIM has had a small presence in northern Togo since 2021, with several attacks carried out since then.); Ivory Coast (Note: Jihadist groups have little to no presence on Ivorian soil, but have occasionally launched attacks along the Burkinabe-Ivorian border since 2019. AQIM attacked Grand-Bassam in 2016 as well.); Algeria (Note: No jihadist groups are active on Algerian soil, although the country has been attacked several times in the early days of the Mali War by jihadist groups. Currently, diplomatic relations between the AES states and Algeria are bad due to Algeria allowing FLA rebels on their soil.); Mauritania (Note: The Mauritanian government currently has a non-aggression pact with JNIM-aligned jihadists, and has not had an attack by jihadist groups on its soil since 2011. Small JNIM cells are present along the Malian border.) Supported by: Africa Corps (since 2021) (Note: Previously Wagner Group, since renamed Africa Corps and absorbed by Russian government.); Turkey (since 2022); France (2013-2023); United States (until 2024); MINUSMA (2013-2023) (Note: For full list of MINUSMA combatants, see here); AFISMA (2012-2013); G5 Sahel (until 2023)	Al-Qaeda; Jama'at Nasr al-Islam wal Muslimin; Ansarul Islam; Boko Haram; Islamic State; Islamic State - Sahel Province; Lakurawa (2023-present); Islamic State - West Africa Province; Azawad Liberation Front Nigerien anti-coup movement: Patriotic Front for Justice; Free Armed Forces; Former belligerents: CSP-PSD (2023-2024); Coordination of Azawad Movements (2014-2021, 2023-2024); MNLA (2012-2024); HCUA (2013-2024); MAA (2012-2024) GATIA (al-Mahmoud faction) (2023–2024) (Note: Faction affiliated with the CSP-PSD) Patriotic Liberation Front (2023-2024)	Ongoing: Mali War: Tuareg rebels and allied Islamists overrun Northern Mali in 2012 until pushed back by a French intervention; Islamist insurgency in Burkina Faso: Mali War spills over into Burkina Faso by 2015 as Islamists capture about 40% of Burkinabé territory; Islamist insurgency in Niger; Boko Haram insurgency arises and extends in Chad, Niger, and Cameroon; French and American intervention on behalf of governments; Al-Qaeda–Islamic State conflict and the JNIM-ISGS war; Jihadist insurgency in Northern Benin; Rise of the coup belt
2026 Nigerien coup attempt (29–30 August 2026) Part of the Coup Belt Location: Niamey, Niger	Niger National Council for the Safeguard of the Homeland: Presidential Guard; Russia Africa Corps Algeria Alliance of Sahel States: Burkina Faso; Mali	Armed Forces for the Restoration of the Fatherland: Dissident factions of the Niger Armed Forces	Coup failure: Loyalist forces, aided by Russia's Africa Corps, regained control of Niamey's main airbase and the presidential palace by 30 August 2026.; Dozens of mutinous soldiers were killed or arrested.

== See also ==
- Foreign relations of Algeria
- History of Algeria
- Politics of Algeria

== Cited works ==
- Morris, Benny (2001). Righteous Victims: A History of the Zionist-Arab Conflict, 1881-2001. New York: Vintage Books. ISBN 978-0-679-42120-7.
- O'Ballance, Edgar (1978). No Victor, No Vanquished: The Yom Kippur War. Presidio Press. ISBN 978-0-89141-017-1.
- Ottaway, David (1970), Algeria: The Politics of a Socialist Revolution, Berkeley, California: University of California Press, ISBN 978-0-520-01655-2
- Rabinovich, Abraham (2004). The Yom Kippur War: The Epic Encounter That Transformed the Middle East. New York: Schocken Books. ISBN 978-0-8052-4176-1.
- Shazly, Lieutenant General Saad el (2003). The Crossing of the Suez, Revised Edition (revised ed.). American Mideast Research. ISBN 978-0-9604562-2-2.
