= Ibrahim ben Ramdan Dey =

Ibrahim Ben Ramdan
- Dey of Algiers

14th Dey of Algiers
- Reign: 3 September 1732 – 11 December 1745
- Predecessor: Baba Abdi
- Successor: Ibrahim Kouchouk
- Born: Ibrahim ben Ramdan
- Died: 1745; Algiers, Regency of Algiers
Names
- Baba Ibrahim ben Ramdan Dey III
- Country: Regency of Algiers
- Religion: Islam
- Occupation: Hazinedar then Dey
- Military career
- Conflicts: Spanish conquest of Oran (1732); Capture of Tunis (1735)

Ibrahim ben Ramdan or Baba Ibrahim was the 14th ruler and Dey of Algiers. He ruled 15 years after his predecessor Baba Abdi.

== Early life ==
He was Khaznadar (treasurer) under the previous dey, Baba Abdi.

== Rule ==
He was elected Dey on 3 September 1732.

His reign started off with a decisive defeat at the hands of the Spain during the Siege of Oran in 1732. This defeat led to the loss of the strategic city of Oran and Mers El Kébir, and Spain gaining a foothold in Algeria.

He gained a victory over the Beylik of Tunis during the Algerian-Tunisian war of 1735, securing the annual payment of 50,000 Piastres.

He abdicated in 1745, citing old age. His nephew, Ibrahim Kouchouk was elected as the next dey.

== See also ==
- List of governors and rulers of the Regency of Algiers
