= Baba Abdi =

Dey (ruler) of Algiers (1724–1732)

- Dey of Algiers

13th Dey of Algiers
- Reign: 18 March 1724 - 3 September 1732
- Predecessor: Mohamed Ben Hassan
- Successor: Ibrahim ben Ramdan Dey
- Born: 1644
- Died: 1732; Algiers, Regency of Algiers
- Country: Regency of Algiers
- Religion: Islam
- Occupation: Agha of the Spahis, then Dey

Baba Abdi or Kûr Abdi was the 13th ruler and Dey of Algiers. He ruled five months after his predecessor Mohamed Ben Hassen.

== Rule ==
=== Biography ===
He was born around 1644 and was nicknamed as Kûr Abdi by the Turks, as he was blind in one of his eyes due to Smallpox. He was described someone with « a good character and great finesse, but an addiction to smoking opium ». After an attack that Mohamed suffered from the Odjaks of Algiers while he was doing his routine inspections on the dock of Algiers, the Janissaries rushed to the Jenina Palace to elect a Dey of their own, the Agha of the Sipahis. After barely placing him on the throne, the Noubagis (Guards of the place) threatened to open fire on them if they didn't leave the palace, they insisted that the Dey was already proclaimed, the guards opened fire killing 3 on the spot while 2 managed to escape. The Diwan of Algiers elected him instead as he was a very close friend of his predecessor.

=== Outside diplomatic relations ===
The Dutch wanted to take advantage of the new Dey to discuss for peace, they sent Admiral Godin to Algiers and arrived the 3th of may, but left 6 days later as the Algerian responded to his offers with outrageous demands. That more humiliating for him, because at the same time, the Ambassador of Istanbul received a better reception than the Dutch, and even was invited by the Dey where he also received the Kaftan of Pasha. even with this reception, after hearing the reclamations of the emperor, the Dey exploded in anger and kept shouting « Ah! he has all the rest of the world, and he still needs Algiers! »

The subjects of the sultan tried a second time, but still failed as the Janissaries were discontent when they heard that they needed to return their captured ships. The next year the Sublime Porte went for another attempt, reclaiming the head of Çerkes Mehmed old bey of Cairo (de facto), which Kûr Abdi refused to do so. The Dutch and the Swedes managed to negotiate a truce with Abdi after paying 30,000 piastres, Abdi also strangled the Agha and Muphti of the militia that opposed the Dey, this resulted in a riot that killed his son after he came back from the Hajj to Mecca, on February 29, 1728.

Ali Pasha, nephew of Husayn ibn Ali, 1st bey of Tunis at the time, revolted against his uncle and escaped to Algiers, Abdi decided to keep him imprisoned in Algiers as long as he pays a tax of 10,000 sequins.

In 1729, the Sublime Porte, tired of the disobedience of the Algerians and the reclamations of different European nations of the power that the Deys had in Algiers. They elected Azlan-Mohammed with the title of Pasha and sent him for Algiers escorted by Capidjys and other 45 people, when arrived in the Bay of the Capital, they received the order to anchorage in Cap Matifou or they would open fire on them, the weather was terrible and the wind blowing in the other direction, the Turks felt that there was no other choice and anchored as the Dey told them so, seeing the Turks submitting to his orders, the Dey sent them some living and provided a ship, better than the one they were navigating on.

=== Death ===
The old Baba Abdi couldn't stand the grief that he felt after the fall of the city. He blamed himself for not taking the necessary measures and not sending the reinforcement that the Bey Bouchlagem asked so much for. He would lock himself and deprived himself of food, smoking opium until he eventually died of starvation at the age of 88 years old. His brother-in-law Ibrahim ben Ramdan would be elected as his successor without opposition.

== See also ==
- List of governors and rulers of the Regency of Algiers
