= Mohamed Ben Hassan =

Mohammad ben Hassan
- Dey of Algiers
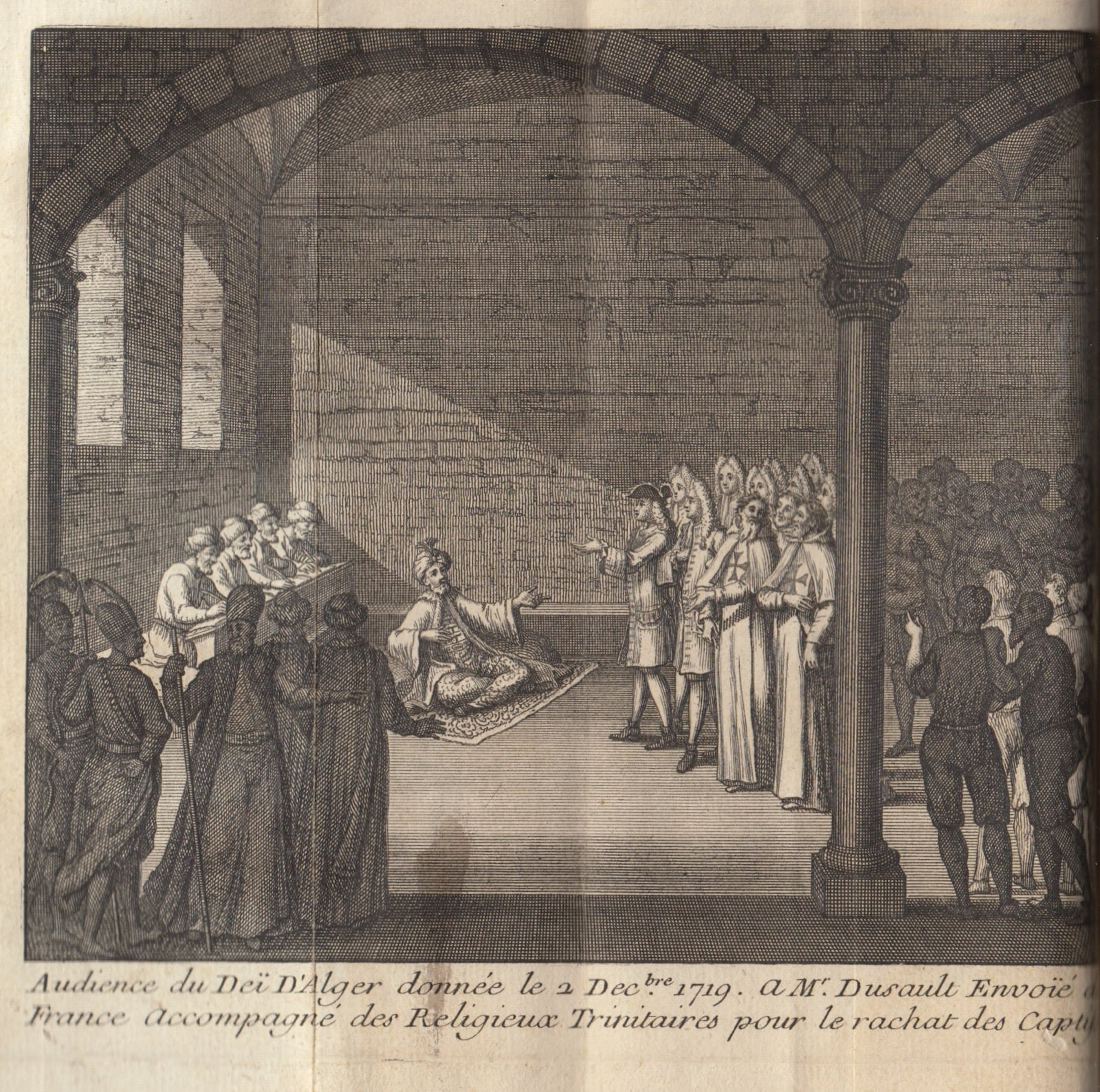
- Illustration of Dey Mohammed ben Hassan during an audience granted on December 2, 1719, to Dussault, an envoy from France.

12th Dey of Algiers
- Reign: 1718–1724
- Predecessor: Baba Ali Chaouch
- Successor: Baba Abdi
- Born: Around 1688 rural Eyalet of Egypt
- Died: 18 May 1724; Algiers, Regency of Algiers
Names
- Muhammad III ben Hassan
- Country: Regency of Algiers
- Religion: Islam
- Occupation: Treasurer then Dey

Mohamed ben Hassan or Muhammad III was an Egyptian military commander and politician. He was the 12th ruler and Dey of Algiers. He ruled five months after his predecessor Baba Ali Chaouch.

== Early life ==
He was born around 1688. He was of Egyptian origins. He was an illiterate herder before he went to Algiers in his teenage years.

== Life in Algiers ==
He learned to read and write in Algiers, and was noted for his intelligence. He soon started working on more important jobs, before being appointed treasurer by Baba Ali Chaouch. He strongly supported Ali in his goals of independence from the Ottomans, and he was staunchly against the Odjak of Algiers. After an earthquake in 1716, he helped rebuild the city.

After the death of Ali in 1718, the Divan of Algiers quickly elected him as the Dey as they were worried that without a staunch ruler the Odjak would take over the country.

== Dey of Algiers ==
After his election he decided to continue the war against the Dutch Republic which Baba Ali started. He heavily invested in barbary piracy and strengthened the country's navy. He continued recovering Algiers from the earthquake, mainly through money he salvaged from the barbary slave trade. He supported the Bey of Titteri's Ali Khodja goals of stabilizing Kabylia. He built a bordj (fort) in the valley of the Sebaou river in 1720, and another Bordj in Boghni in 1724. He worked on weakening the power of the Turks over the Odjak of Algiers, and allowed more Kouloughlis and native Algerians to join the unit. He further angered the Turks by keeping a distant relationship from the Ottoman Empire, and replacing Turks in important positions of power with his relatives and well-skilled Algerians.

== See also ==
- List of governors and rulers of the Regency of Algiers

== Death ==
On 18 May 1724 while he was performing routine inspections on the dock of Algiers and was attacked by five or six Turkish janissaries from the Odjak of Algiers. A Turk suddenly came out of a terras in a house and shot him with a flintlock pistol. Upon this signal several other Turks rushed out of their hiding places and attacked him. After killing him, the Turks rushed to Jenina palace to install a dey of their own, whom they decided would be the Agha of the sipahis. While barely putting the kaftan on him, the Noubagis (guards) of the palace shot them with their muskets. The Turkish conspirators retreated, and a new Dey was elected by the Divan of Algiers, Baba Abdi, whom was also heavily against the Odjak.
