= Capture of Tunis (1735) =

History of Tunisia

- Part of Tunisian-Algerian Wars
| Date | September 1735 |
| Location | Tunis |
| Result | Algerian victory: Capture of Tunis; the Bey of Tunis agrees to pay tribute to Algiers |
| Territorial changes | Tunis becomes a vassal of Algiers |

Belligerents
| Regency of Algiers | Ottoman Tunisia |

Commanders and leaders
| Ibrahim Dey; Ali Pasha | Husayn ibn Ali |

Strength
| 7,000 men | Unknown |

Casualties and losses
| Unknown | Heavy |

The Capture of Tunis occurred in 1735 when the Dey of Algiers sent an invasion force to Tunis in order to install Ali Pasha as the Bey.

After a failed revolt Ali Pasha took refuge in Algiers where he managed to gain the support of the Dey. The Dey of Algiers dispatched a force of 7,000 men to invade Tunis and install Ali Pasha there as its Bey.

The Algerians arrived at the front of Tunis on the third of September. After the doors were opened at night an army that attempted to defend Tunis was greatly massacred. The Algerians captured Tunis and installed Ali Pasha as the Bey and as a vassal of Algiers. The Bey Ali Pasha recognised himself as a vassal of Algiers and paid an annual tribute to the Dey.

== See also ==
- Tunisian-Algerian War (1694)
- Tunisian-Algerian War (1756)
