= Tunisian–Algerian War (1813) =

Conflict between the Regencies of Algiers and Tunis

Tunisian-Algerian War (1813)
- Part of Tunisian–Algerian Wars
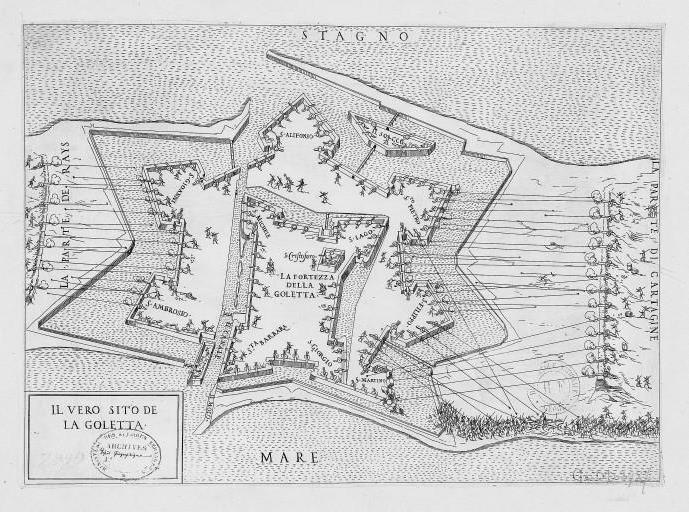
- Plan of the fort of la Goulette between 1500 and 1600.
Date	24 July 1813
Location	Tunisia and Algeria
Result	Peace Treaty; Tunisian invasion repelled; Political instability in Tunisia after the death of Hammouda Pasha
Territorial changes	Status quo ante bellum

Belligerents
Regency of Algiers	Beylik of Tunis

Commanders and leaders
Hadj Ali Dey: Mohhamed Nàmane	Hammuda Ali Youssef Bey

Strength
Unknown	Unknown but 40,000 men were added to reinforce the protection of the fort.

Casualties and losses
Unknown	Unknown

The Tunisian–Algerian War of 1813 was a conflict between the Regency of Algiers and the Regency of Tunis.

== Background ==
Since the Naval War of 1811, Diplomatic relations between Algiers and Tunis were disrupted by preparations and hostilities near the common border. Both sides were had a significant military presence nearby, in both Kef and Constantine. Although the idea of a peaceful settlement was embraced by both nations, on July 24, 1812, Algiers imposed a blockade of 19 sailboats on the port of La Goulette, situated in the northern part of Tunis. The imposition of the blockade was a manifestation of oppression against the Dey Hammuda ibn Ali, On August 10 the Admiral of Algiers, who was charged with the blockade, sent a letter from the Dey Hadj Ali in which he offered to sign a definitive peace treaty only if the Regency recognized the suzerainty of Algiers. Although the proposal was declined, Hammuda, who desired peace between the two nations, sent a cargo of oil to the Dey for the mosques in the capital.

The Algerian ships, still blockading the port, did not take any aggressive action for a couple of days. During that time the port were increased and had been placed in a state of readiness. The Tunisian army had strengthened their defense In Kef and its surroundings. The border fortification was the idea of the Tunisian Prime Minister, Youssef Sahab et-taba, who recently took the command of the Tunisian army. On the other side of the border in Constantine, the Bey of Constantine, Mohammed Nàmane, gathered a huge quantity of ammunition and troops in the city as well. This proved to be unnecessary since the Algerians began the offensive in La Goulette.

== War ==
On July 23, 1813, the Algerian navy bolstered its forces at the port of La Goulette, numbering 54 sailboats and 25 gunboats. The Algerian force managed to deal considerable damage to the fort, but was forced to retreat to Algiers on August 4 after suffering considerable damage.

This led to a surprise invasion of the Beylik of Constantine by Youssef. Nàmane gathered enough troops to repel the Tunisians. The two regimes both suffered from terrible economic crises, as they were using all of their resources for war. The Tunisians were worried about the re-imposition of the blockade or another invasion of Kef the following season. This led to the construction of another 60 gunboats by Algeria. On the Tunisian side however, Youssef managed to build a large army in Kef, with more than 40,000 troops ready for the second invasion. The war finally ended in December 1813, when old Hammed Pasha agreed to a peace, before dying on September 15, 1814.
