= Tunisian–Algerian War =

The Tunisian-Algerian Wars were a set of wars fought between the Regency of Algiers, and the Regency of Tunis. Tunisian–Algerian War may refer to:

- Tunisian–Algerian War (1628)
- Tunisian–Algerian War (1694), or Algerian-Tunisian War (1694)
- Maghrebi war (1699–1702), or Constantine campaign (1699–1700)
- Tunisian–Algerian War (1705), or Algerian Invasion of Tunis (1705)
- Capture of Tunis (1735), or Algerian-Tunisian War (1735)
- Siege of Tunis (1746)
- Capture of Tunis (1756), or Algerian-Tunisian war (1756)
- Tunisian–Algerian War (1807), or Algerian-Tunisian War (1807)
- Action of 22 May 1811, or Algerian-Tunisian naval war (1811)
- Tunisian–Algerian War (1813), or Algerian-Tunisian war (1813)
