= Tunisian–Algerian War (1694) =

Conflict between Regency of Tunis and Deylik of Algiers (1694)

First Tunisian campaign
- Part of the Tunisian–Algerian Wars
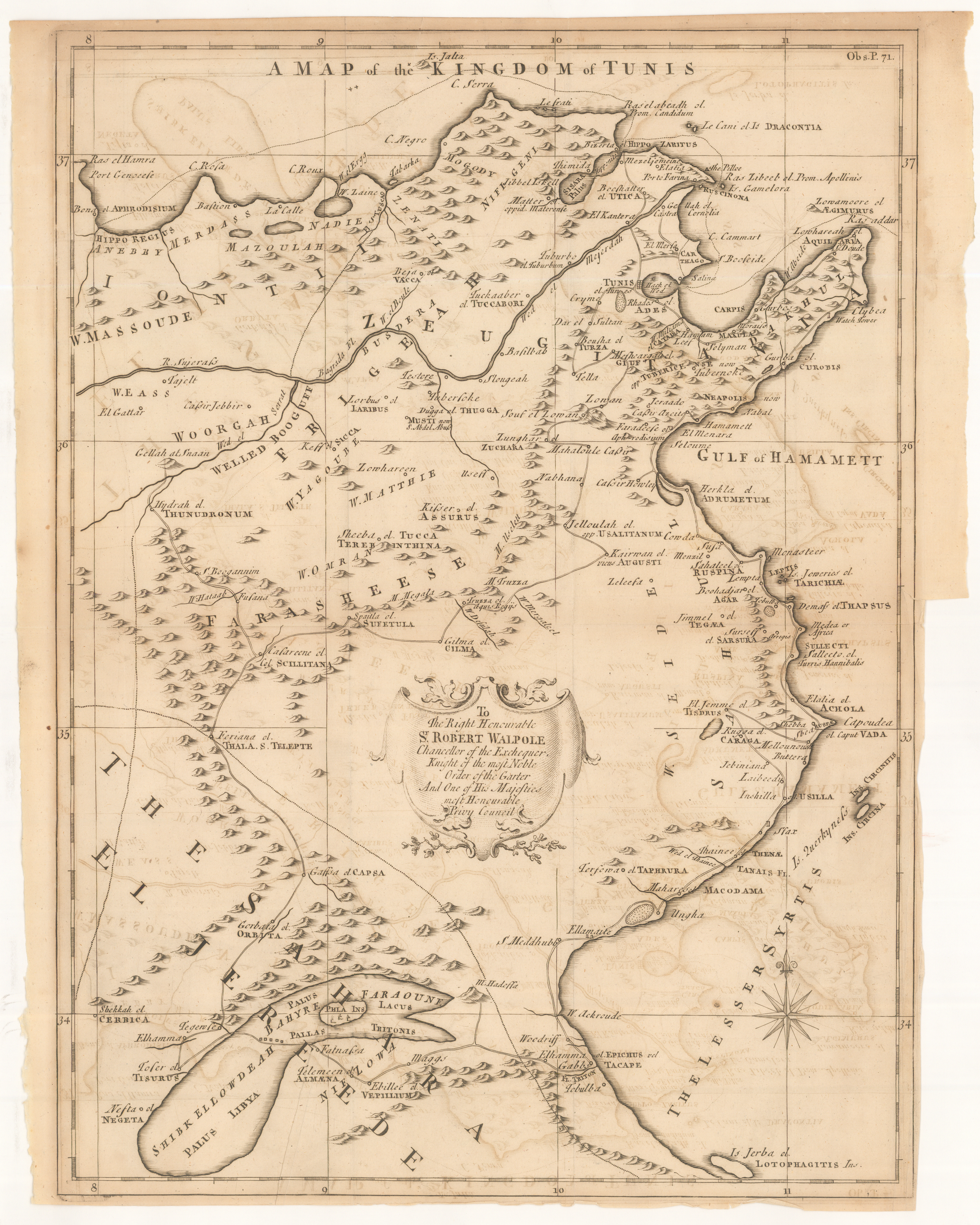
- Kingdom of Tunis in 1694 by Shaw Thomas
Date	June 24 – November 1694
Location	Tunisia
Result	Algerian victory: All of Tunisia occupied (until 1695).; Moroccan-Tunisian alliance.; Maghrebi war (1699–1702)
Territorial changes	Tunis becomes a beylik (governorate) of Algiers

Belligerents
Regency of Algiers; Northwestern tribes; Beylik of Constantine	Tunisia

Commanders and leaders
Hadj Chabane; Mohamed ben Cheker; Ali Khoudja bey	Mohamed Bey; Mourad ibn Ali; Ibrahim Cherif; Husayn ben Ali

Strength
Algerian forces: August–October: 3,400 troops: 400 janissaries; 1,000 Algerian sipahis; 2,000 Arab-Berber cavalry; November: 4,500 troops	August–November: 15,000 infantry 600 cavalry

Casualties and losses
200	600–700

The Tunisian–Algerian war of 1694 was a conflict between the Deylik of Algiers, and the Regency of Tunis.

== Background ==
Ever since the establishment of Ottoman Tunisia, the Deys of the country were elected by the Turkish janissaries. The Pasha of Tunis appointed by the Ottoman Sultan had no power. That was at least the case until 1613, when Murad I Bey, a Janissary of Corsican origins seized power in Tunis, and founded the Muradid dynasty.

In 1675, Murad II Bey died, and he left his state to his son Mohamed Bey El Mouradi. Mohamed exiled the Pasha, Muhammad al-Hafsi. Murad II's second son, Ali bin Murad, disappointed by his share in the division of power had sought refuge in the Beylik of Constantine a governorate of the Regency of Algiers (also known as Algeria). He brought the tribes of northwest Tunisia led by Muhammad ben Cheker over to his side with promises of gold and silver.

He besieged Tunis, while Muhammad Bey al-Muradi fled from Tunis to Kairouan before the troops of his brother arrived. Ali besieged the city but Muhammad broke out of the siege, and met Ali on the field of battle. The Battle of El Kerima, which took place on the plain of Fahs in 1677 was decisively won by Ali. He had his troops besiege Kairouan and returned to Tunis to be recognised as Bey in place of his brother who remained under siege in Kairouan.

After some mediation by the Dey of Algiers, a treaty was signed in 1679 between the Muradid princes, but this peace didn't last long.

The Turkish janissaries of Tunis elected their own leader, Ahmed Chelebi who attempted to take over the country. He was defeated by the Algerians who feared that the revolutionary spirit of the janissaries in Tunis would spread to their own country. They sacked Tunis in 1686, and left the country in ruins. Mohamed bey suspected his brother of supporting the Algerians, and thus killed him and seized power for himself. Muhammad ben Cheker (the leader of the northwestern tribes, wanted the Beylik to himself, and hearing about the infighting, he visited Algiers to negotiate with the Algerians in 1694.

== First phase of the war (1694) ==
=== Start of the campaign ===
Dey Hadj Chabane agreed to help ben Cheker in conquering Tunis, but only he would subjugate himself and become an Algerian vassal. Muhammad ben Cheker agreed, and declared independence from Tunis. On June 24 Algerian troops entered Tunisian territory, and started rapidly advancing into the heartlands of Tunisia. The Algerian army consisted of Janissaries, troops from the Beylik of Constantine led by Ali Khoudja Bey, and the allied tribes of ben Cheker. The Tunisian armies were led by Mohamed Bey, Mourad ibn Ali (the son of Ali, the aforementioned pretender), Ibrahim Cherif a commander, and his lieutenant Husain ibn Ali.

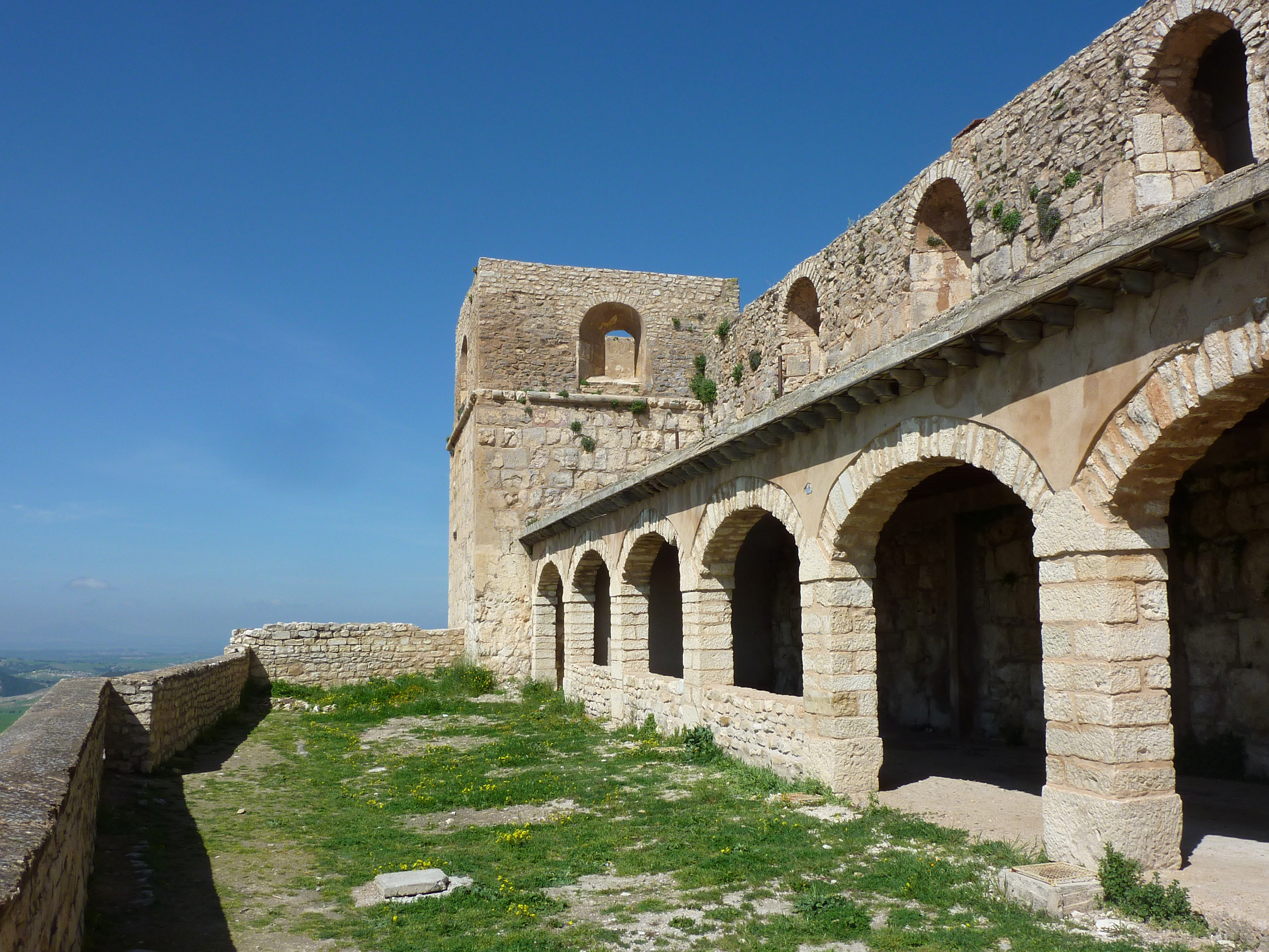
The fort of El Kef

After a few towns were captured by the Algerians, the Tunisians arrived at the fort of El Kef, where they awaited their Algerian foes.

=== The first Battle of Kef ===
On the same day that the campaign started, the Algerians arrived under Kef. Mohamed Bey attempting to save himself allied with the Moroccans, albeit as they had no common borders, the Moroccans could do nothing other than send him weaponry. Knowing that his weak army couldn't defeat the Algerian one, he decided to offer a tribute to the Algerians. Hadj Chabane refused this, and attacked the Tunisians. The battle ended in a catastrophic defeat for the Tunisians, who started fleeing from the invading forces. Mohamed retreating into Tunis planned on fortifying the town, and holding back the Algerian forces.

=== The first siege of Tunis ===
The Algerian troops arrived under Tunis in August, and began the siege. Despite fierce Tunisian resistance, after a month, the Algerian artillery breached the walls, and their troops started fighting the Tunisian defenders. After about 3 months of heavy fighting, in November, Tunis fell to the Algerians, who pillaged the newly conquered town. This further angered the population of Tunis, where anti-Algerian sentiment has been growing ever seen they pillaged Tunis in 1686. Mohamed Bey was forced to flee the country, albeit sources vary on where exactly he went to. Some state that he fled to Chios, while others that he fled into the Sahara. He was soon replaced by the unpopular ben Cheker, albeit in reality Tunis was completely occupied and controlled by Algiers.

== Aftermath ==
Fed up with the occupation, ruined economy and extremely high taxes imposed by the Algerians, the people of Tunis, Sousse and Kairouan revolted. In April 1695 they chased Muhammad ben Cheker out of Tunis, who in turn started raising troops further down south. They crowned Mohamed Bey as king again, and on May 1 he attacked ben Cheker's troops near Kairouan. The Battle of Kairouan was a decisive victory for Mohamed Bey, and ben Cheker was forced to flee the country. An ancient Amphitheatre was largely destroyed by artillery shells during the battle.

After stabilization, the Tunisian Bey signed an alliance with the sultan of Morocco, which would soon culminate in the Maghrebi war (1699–1701).

== See also ==
- Tunisian-Algerian War (1735)
- Tunisian-Algerian War (1756)
