= Capture of Tunis (1756) =

Military operation by the Bey of Constantine

| Date | 1756 |
| Location | Tunis |
| Result | Algerian victory: Capture of Tunis; Tunis becomes a tributary of Algiers; Tunis recognises the suzerainty of the Dey of Algiers |
| Territorial changes | Tunis becomes a tributary of Algiers and recognises Algerian suzerainty for more than 50 years |

Belligerents
| Algiers | Tunis (Sovereign Military Order of Malta) Malta |

Commanders and leaders
| Sidi Hassan | Sidi Mamet † |

Strength
| 5,000 fantassins 1,000 spahis Arab cavalry | Tunis: 14,000 men Malta: 4 galleys and 2 vessels |

Casualties and losses
| Unknown | Heavy |

The Capture of Tunis was a military operation led by the Bey of Constantine during which he seized Tunis and made the Beylik of Tunis a tributary of Algiers.

On the 10th of July in 1756 the Algerians appeared in front of Kef which they captured and looted on the 23rd of July. The Bey of Tunis retreated to the castle of Tunis along with Sidi Mamet where they gathered their troops in order to defend the city. Sidi Mamet was able to obtain help from Malta, they supported them with four galleys and two vessels.

The Bey of Constantine, Hassan Bey, arrived at the walls of Tunis with the Algerian army. The Algerians camped in front of the Bardo with 5,000 fantassins, 1,000 spahis and a number of Arab cavalry, this army was divided into three corps and commanded by Hassan Bey of Constantine. The Bey of Tunis had 14,000 men.

At first Sidi Mamet left the castle of Tunis with all of his troops but only allowed the Arab cavalry to skirmish among themselves, two or three hours after this Sidi Mamet had returned in the same manner he had left. The next day Sidi Mamet attacked the Algerians attempting to drive them out, the armies engaged in combat and the Tunisians eventually withdrew, the loss of men on both sides were not very considerable.

The Algerians and Tunisians eventually reengaged in combat, both parties of cavalry met in the morning both of them were reinforced and the Bey of Tunis brought out his infantry as he feared that his cavalry would be beaten. The two armies met and fired at each other, the first discharges were made but the Algerians marched forward, the Tunisian Moors were so terrified that they fled. The Turks on the side of Tunis fought well and only fled when they realised that they were unable to resist the Algerian offensive. The Algerians recklessly pursued the Tunisians but were pushed back by musketeers and cannon after which they withdrew.

After a while the Algerians received a reinforcement of 2,000 men, a while after this, the Algerians attacked the entrenchments and were met with weak resistance. The Tunisian Moors abandoned the entrenchments and fled to the gates of the city, the Algerians pursued them, took advantage of their fear and massacred them. The Algerians captured the city and the looting began, Christian, Turkish and Jewish houses were ransacked and so was the castle and the Bardo where Ali Bey and Sidi Mamets possessions were looted. All free women or slaves were taken to camp, they were dragged along with many Jews through the streets to either be sold or redeemed. There were more than 5,000 or 6,000 men who were killed.

The Pasha and Sidi Mamet were prepared to flee but were too late, Sidi Mamet was captured and his ears were immediately cut off, then his head was cut off and brought on the end of a spear to be exposed. The Pasha was taken to the camp and put in chains along with his family who were to be taken to Algiers, their main officers were also captured. Tunis had become a tributary of Algiers and continued to pay an annual tribute and recognise Algerian suzerainty for more than 50 years.

== See also ==
- Tunisian-Algerian Wars
- Tunisian-Algerian War (1694)
- Capture of Tunis (1735)
