= Hazinedar (surname) =

- Language: Turkish

Origin
- Meaning: treasurer

Other names
- Variant forms: Haznedar; Haznadar; Hazinadar; Khazindar; Khaznadar

Hazinedar is a Turkish language surname. It is derived from words hazine(t) (English: treasury) and Persian language suffix -dar. Vuk Karadžić in Srpski rječnik noted that Serbian surname Haznadarović is derived from the occupation of family ancestor who was hazinedar.

== Notable people ==
- Admir Haznadar, Bosnian footballer
