= Battle of Abomey =

Coordinates: 7.185737°N 1.999083°E

The Battle of Abomey (1892) was the climactic struggle in the Dahomey War between France and the Kingdom of Dahomey. French forces, commanded by Alfred-Amédée Dodds, were victorious over the Dahomey army. The triumph was pivotal to linking French possessions in upper Senegal with those in the upper Niger.
