= Ottoman Tunisia =

Semi-autonomous state affiliated with the Ottoman Empire

Eyalet of Tunis إيالة تونس (Arabic) ایالت تونس (Ottoman Turkish)
- 1574–1881
- Flag Coat of arms

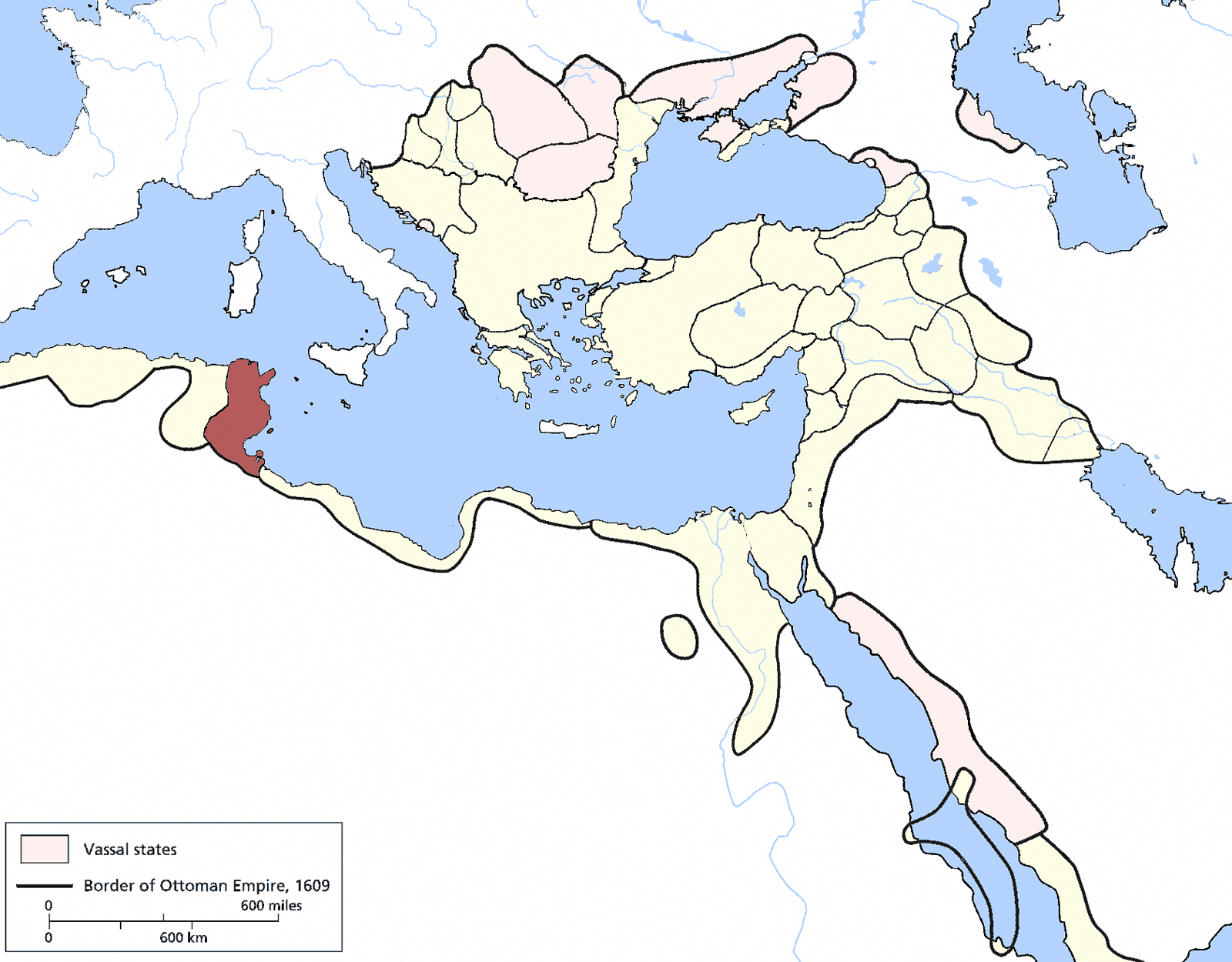
- The Eyalet of Tunis in 1609
- Status: Autonomous eyalet of the Ottoman Empire
- Capital: Tunis
- Common languages: Tunisian Arabic, Ottoman Turkish, Judeo-Tunisian Arabic, Berber
- Religion: Sunni Islam
- Government: Monarchy
- History
  - Ottoman conquest of Tunis: 13 September 1574
  - Janissary Deys rise to power: 1591
  - Muradid dynasty begins: 1613
  - Husainid dynasty begins: 1705
  - French Protectorate established: 12 May 1881
- Currency: Tunisian rial
Preceded by	Succeeded by
Hafsid dynasty	French protectorate of Tunisia
- Today part of: Tunisia; Algeria

Ottoman Tunisia (also known as the Eyalet of Tunis or the Regency of Tunis) was a semi-autonomous territory of the Ottoman Empire. It existed from the 16th to the 19th century and was located roughly in present-day Tunisia (and parts of modern eastern Algeria).

The Ottoman presence in the Maghreb began with the conquest of Algiers in 1516 by the Ottoman Turkish corsair, Beylerbey Aruj Barbarossa (Oruç Reis). In 1534, the Ottoman Navy under the command of Kapudan Pasha Hayreddin Barbarossa, Aruj's younger brother, captured Tunis from the Hafsid dynasty. Less than a year later, in 1535, the Holy Roman Emperor, Charles V sent a multinational invasion force to wrest back control of Tunis, overwhelming the Ottoman garrison. Following the final Ottoman reconquest of Tunis from Spain in 1574, the Ottomans maintained control of Tunis for over three centuries. Their rule came to an end following the French conquest of Tunisia in 1881.

Tunis was initially ruled from the Ottoman Regency of Algiers; however, the Ottomans established a separate governor (pasha) for Tunis, whose authority was backed by Janissaries under his command. As a result, Tunis began to function as a separate province with a considerable degree of autonomy. Although Algiers occasionally contested this, Tunis maintained its autonomous status. Like other distant Ottoman territories, the governing councils responsible for administering the province consisted mostly of Ottoman elites (Turks, Egyptians, Albanians, etc.) from other parts of the empire. State affairs were primarily conducted in Ottoman Turkish.

At the center of what was then known as the Barbary Coast, Barbary corsairs used North African ports like Algiers, Tunis, and Tripoli as bases to target European shipping and, at the height of their power, to raid ports and towns along Europe's Mediterranean coast. During these raids, Barbary pirates frequently captured European sailors and civilians, who were either ransomed or sold into slavery. For centuries, Tunis was among the principal centers of the Barbary slave trade. Eventually, a prolonged decline in raids and the increasing naval power of European states, culminating in a series of punitive wars by the United States later joined by Sweden and the Kingdom of Sicily, brought an end to the raids and the slave trade.

By the end of the Ottoman period, Tunisia had experienced a considerable loss in its territory. The decay in Ottoman authority throughout the 18th and 19th centuries led to conflicts with rival provinces, especially Tripoli, and foreign encroachment on their territory. In the 19th century, Tunisian rulers observed the ongoing political and social reforms occurring throughout the Ottoman Empire. Inspired by the Turkish model, the Bey of Tunis began modernizing Tunisia's administration, infrastructure, and economy, though these modernization efforts were expensive and would lead to Tunisia amassing a considerable amount of foreign debt. In 1881, France used this as a pretext to establish a Protectorate, effectively taking control over the territory.

The legacy of the centuries-long period of Ottoman rule in Tunisia is evident in the presence of Tunisia's large Turkish community. Historically, children of Turkish fathers and native mothers were known as the Kouloughlis.

== History ==
=== Mediterranean rivalries ===
In the 16th century, control of the western Mediterranean was contested between the Spaniards and the Turks, both confident due to recent triumphs and subsequent expansion. In 1492, Spain completed its centuries-long Reconquista of the Iberian Peninsula, followed by the establishment of the first Spanish settlements in America. Spain then devised an African policy, establishing a series of presidios (a type of fortification against attacks) in port cities along the African coast. The Ottoman Turks achieved their long-term ambition of capturing Constantinople in 1453, then successfully expanded further into the Balkans (1459–1482), and later conquered Syria and Egypt (1516–1517).

Turkish Barbary corsairs operated from bases in the Maghreb. Spain captured and occupied several ports in North Africa, including Mers-el-Kebir (1505), Oran (1509), and Tripoli and Bougie (1510). Spain also established treaty relations with several other ports. These agreements included Algiers (1510), which granted Spain occupation of the offshore island of Peñón de Argel. Spain also reached agreements with Tlemcen (1511), a city about 60 km inland, and with Tunis, whose Spanish alliance lasted inconsistently for decades. Near Tunis, the port of Goletta was later occupied by Spanish forces, who built a large and strong presidio there. They also constructed an aqueduct to Tunis for use by the kasbah.

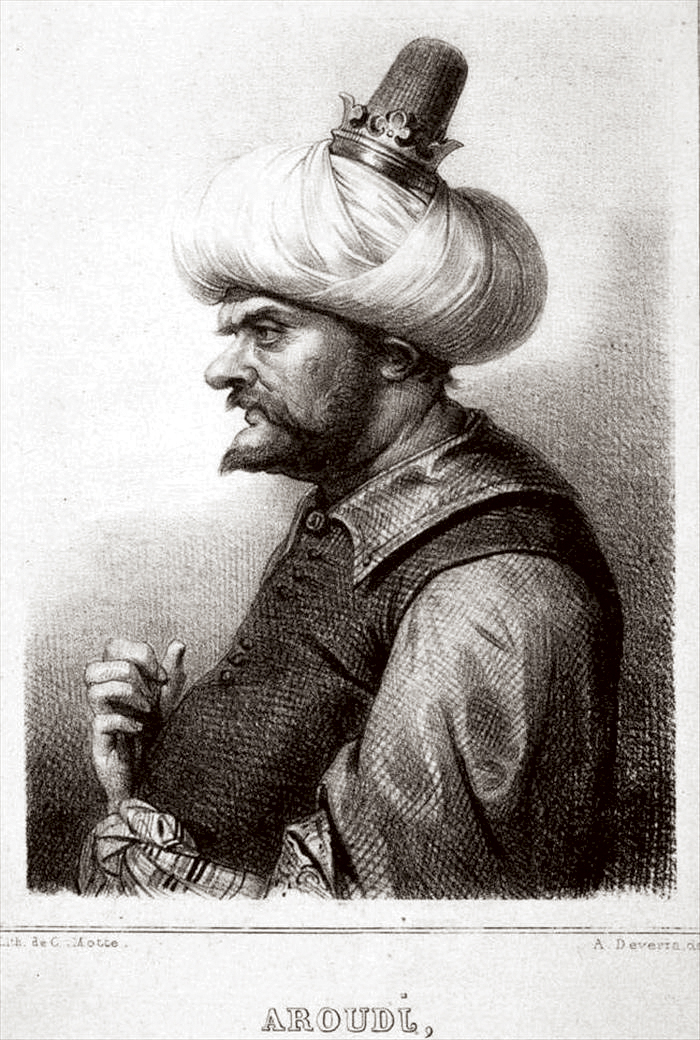
Aruj (c.1474–1518), the elder Barbarossa

The Hafsid dynasty had ruled Tunisia since 1227. It experienced periods of prestige as the leading state of the Maghreb, as well as times of struggle. Over the centuries, extensive trade with European merchants persisted, leading to the establishment of state treaties. However, the Hafsids also harbored corsairs who raided merchant shipping. In the 15th century, the Hafsids employed a Christian force, primarily consisting of Catalans, as bodyguards. By the 16th century, Hafsid rule weakened, often confined to Tunis alone. The last three Hafsid sultans—al-Hasan, his son Ahmad, and his brother Muhammad—engaged in inconsistent treaties with Spain.

The cross-cultural Hafsid alliance with Spain was not uncommon, given the numerous Muslim-Christian treaties, notwithstanding recurrent hostilities. During the early 16th century, for example, France allied with the Ottomans against the Spanish Emperor Charles V. As an indirect result of Spain's African policy, some Muslim rulers encouraged Turkish forces to enter the region to counter the Spanish presence. The Hafsid rulers of Tunis viewed the Turks and their corsair allies as a greater threat and formed an alliance with the Spanish, as did the Saadians of Morocco. Nevertheless, many Maghrebi Muslims strongly preferred Islamic rule, and the Hafsid's decades-long Spanish alliance was generally unpopular and even anathema to some. On the other hand, the Saadi dynasty sultans of Morocco successfully played off Iberians against Turks, thus remaining both Muslim-ruled and independent of the Ottoman grasp.

The Ottoman Empire from 1299 to 1683, the year of their second Siege of Vienna.

In this naval struggle, the Ottoman Empire supported many Barbary pirates who raided European commercial shipping in the Mediterranean. The corsairs later established Algiers as their principal base. The "architects of Ottoman rule in the Maghrib" were Oruç Reis (Aruj Barbarossa; c. 1474–1518) and his younger brother Khayr al-Din (c. 1483–1546). Both were known as Barbarossa ("red beard"). The Muslim brothers came from obscure origins in the Greek island of Medelli or Mytilene (ancient Lesbos).

After gaining combat experience in the eastern Mediterranean (during which Aruj was captured and spent three years rowing in a galley of the Knights of St. John before being ransomed), the two brothers arrived in Tunis as corsair leaders. By 1504, they had entered into a privateer agreement with the Hafsid sultan Mohammad b. al-Hasan (1493–1526). Under the agreement, the "prizes" (ships, cargoes, and captives) were to be shared. The brothers operated from Goletta [Halq al Wadi]; they ran similar operations from Djerba in the south, where Aruj served as governor. During these years in Spain, non-Christians, including Muslims, were required to leave, according to the Alhambra Decree. At times, Aruj used his ships to transport many Moorish Andalusians to North Africa, especially Tunisia, earning praise and attracting many Muslim recruits. Twice, Aruj joined the Hafsids in unsuccessful assaults on Bougie, held by Spain. Then the brothers established an independent base in Djidjelli, east of Bougie, which attracted Hafsid hostility.

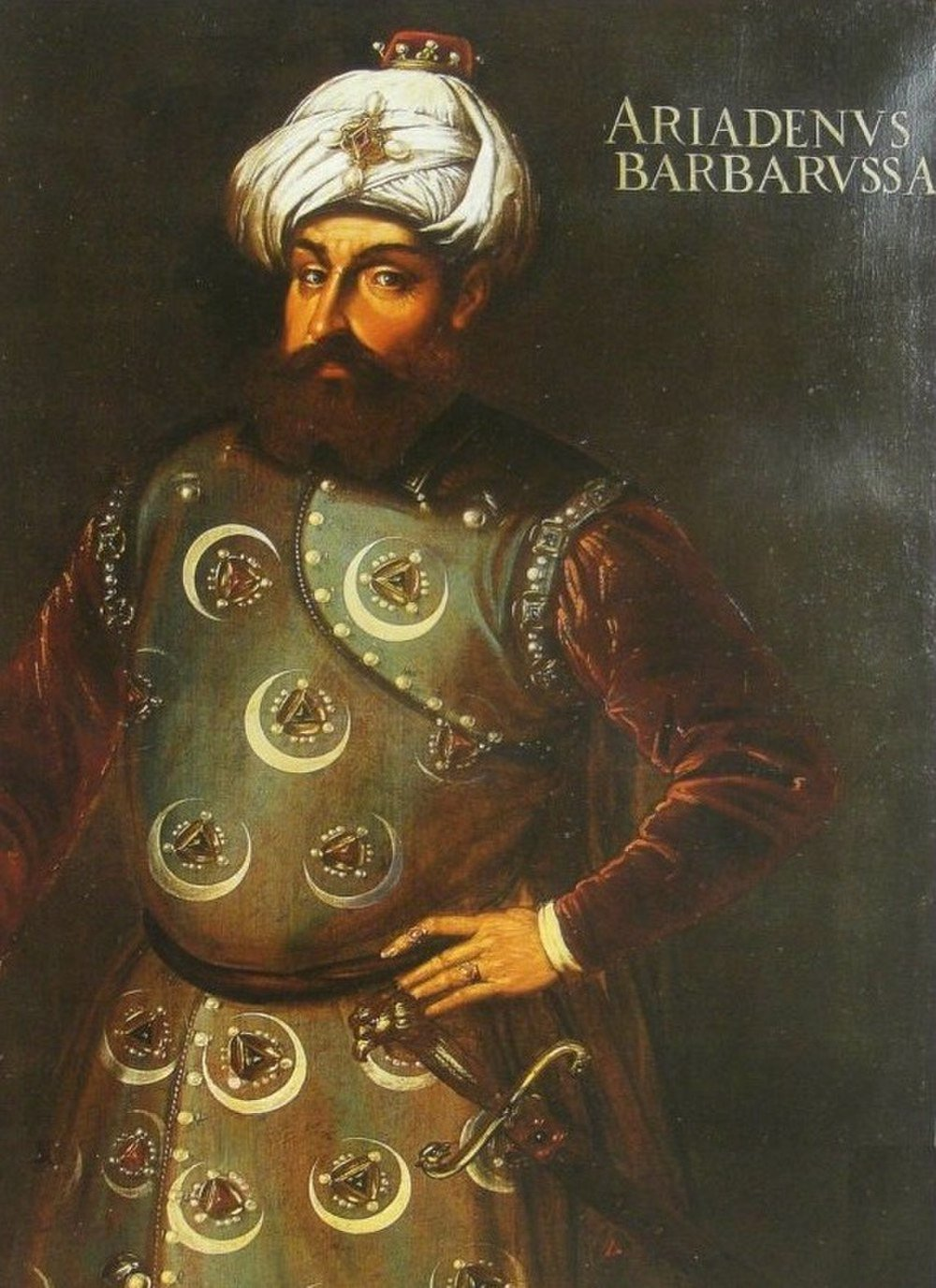
Khayr al-Din (Hayreddin) Pasha (c.1483–1546), the younger Barbarossa

In 1516, the brothers, accompanied by Turkish soldiers, ventured further west to Algiers, where they seized control from the shaykh of the Tha'aliba tribe, who had made a treaty with Spain. Through political machinations, which involved the elimination of the tribal chief and later 22 notables, control of Algiers fell into the hands of the Barbarossa brothers. The Turkish siblings were already allies of the Ottoman Empire. In 1518, during an assault led by Aruj against Tlemcen, which was then under the control of a Spanish ally since 1511, Aruj was killed by Muslim tribal forces and the Spanish.

Khayr al-Din assumed control of Algiers, but temporarily relocated eastward for several years. Upon his return to Algiers in 1529, he seized the offshore island Peñón de Argel from Spain, which controlled the city's port with its guns. By constructing a causeway connecting these islands, he developed an excellent harbor for the city. Khayr al-Din continued to orchestrate large-scale raids on Christian shipping and the coastal regions of Mediterranean Europe, amassing considerable wealth and taking numerous captives. He emerged victorious in several naval battles, earning widespread renown. In 1533, Khayr al-Din was summoned to Constantinople, where the Ottoman sultan appointed him Pasha and admiral of the Turkish navy (Kapudan-i Derya). With this title, he gained command over many more ships and soldiers. In 1534, capitalizing on a revolt against the Hafsid ruler al-Hasan, Khayr al-Din launched a naval invasion and captured the city of Tunis from Spain's allies.

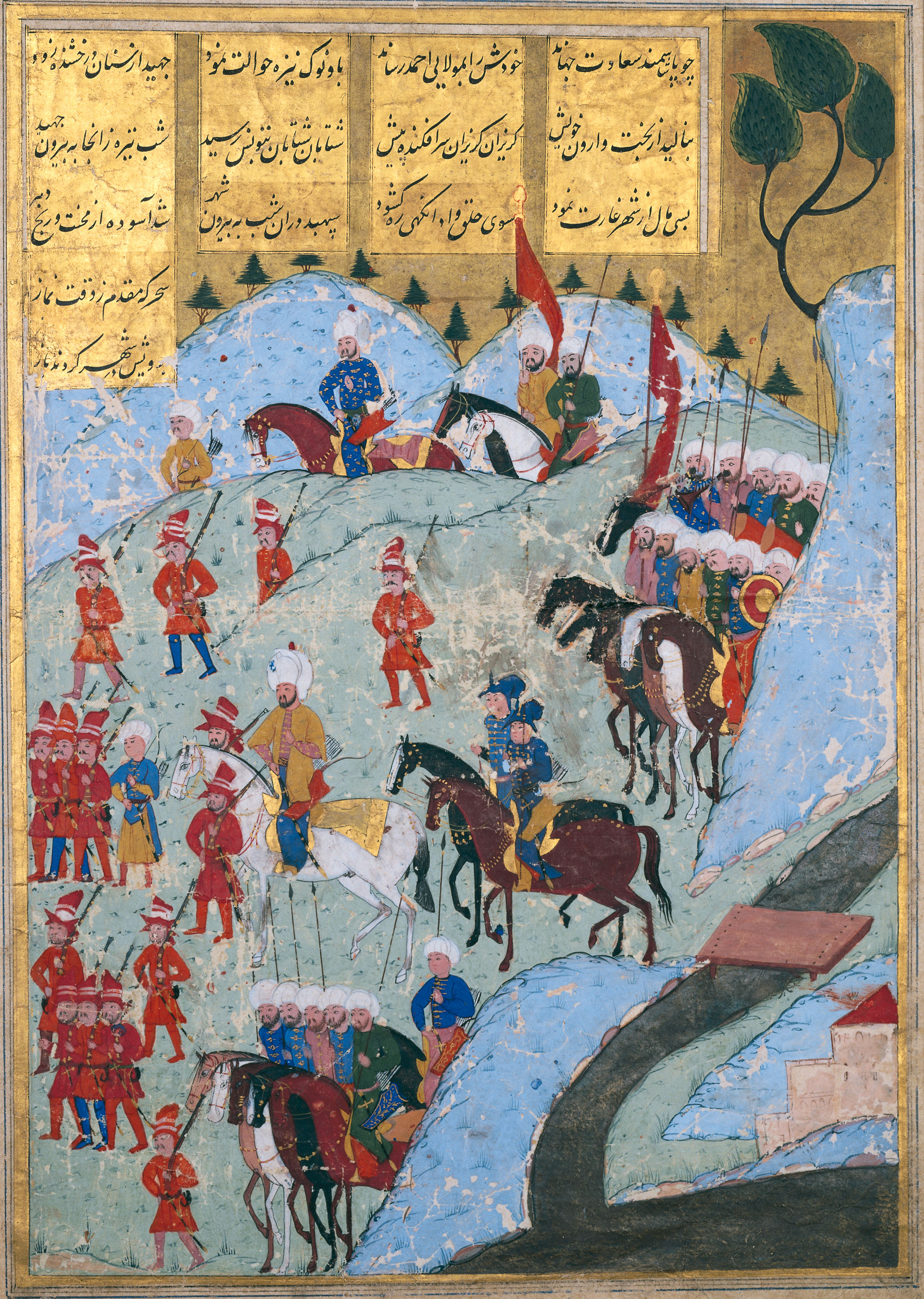
The 1569 march on Tunis by Uluç Ali: 5,000 Janissaries, accompanied by Kabyle troops.

The following year, Emperor Charles V (r. 1516–1556) organized a fleet under Andrea Doria of Genoa, comprising mainly Italians, Germans, and Spaniards, which recaptured Tunis in 1535. Subsequently, the Hafsid sultan Mawlay Hasan was reinstated. However, Khayr al-Din managed to escape. Subsequently, as the supreme commander of Ottoman naval forces, Khayr al-Din was primarily engaged in affairs outside the Maghrib.

=== Establishment of Ottoman rule ===
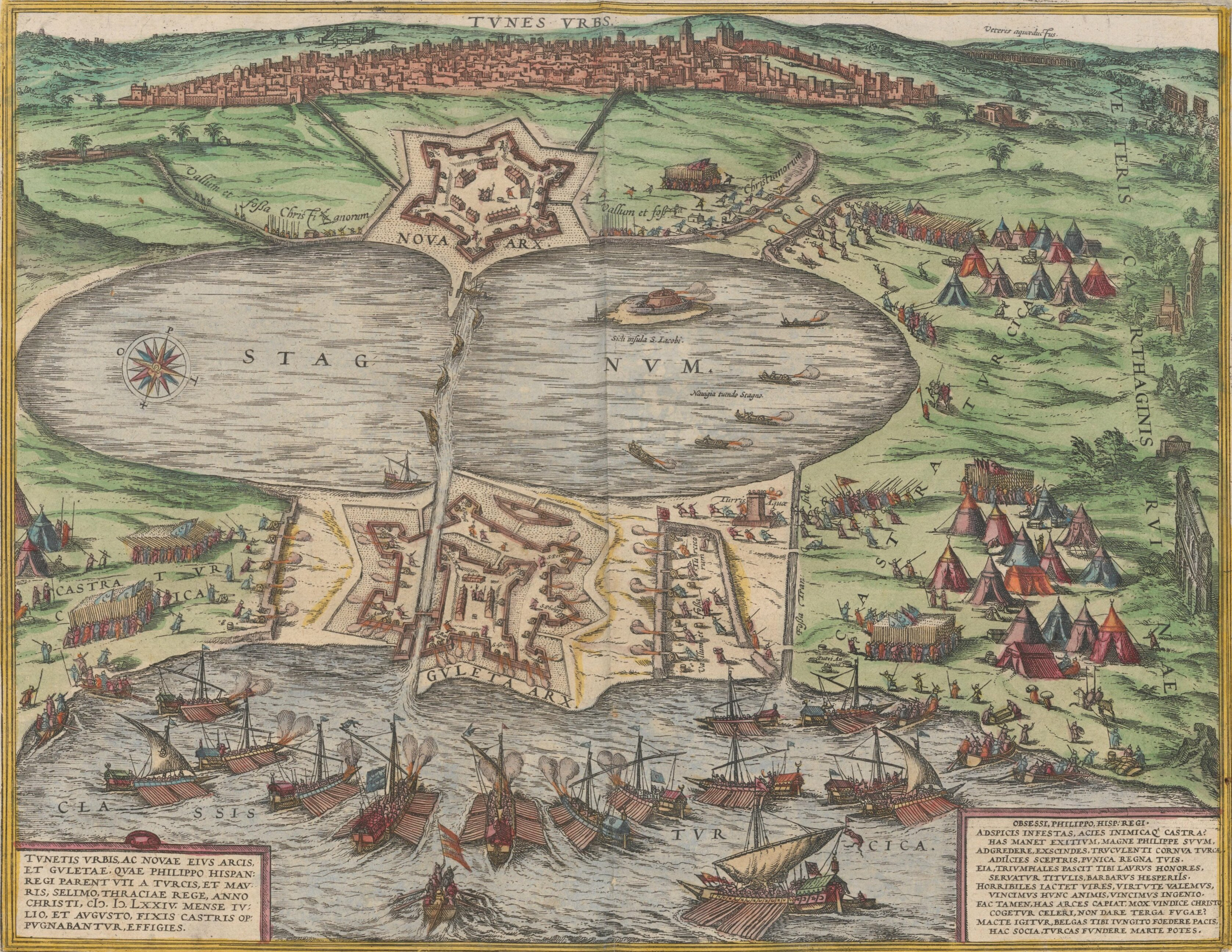
The Capture of Tunis by Uluj Ali, 1574.

A few decades passed until, in 1556, another Turkish corsair, Dragut (Turgut), ruling in Tripoli, attacked Tunisia from the east, entering Kairouan in 1558. In 1569, Uluj Ali Pasha, a renegade corsair, advanced with Turkish forces from the west and seized the Spanish presidio of Goletta and the Hafsid capital, Tunis. After the key naval victory of the Christian armada at the Battle of Lepanto in 1571, Don Juan de Austria retook Tunis for Spain in 1573, restoring the Hafsid's rule. However, in 1574, a large Ottoman expedition returned under the command of Sinan Pasha and captured Tunis permanently. The last ruler of the Hafsid dynasty was then sent by ship to the Ottoman sultan, imprisoned.

In the absence of Turkish intervention in the western Mediterranean, the political landscape favored the Christian north. European powers, led by Spain, continued to strengthen their dominance. Meanwhile, the local Maghrebi states faced declining trade and internal divisions, leaving them vulnerable to potential reconquest from the north. The emergence of another powerful foreign entity, the well-armed Ottoman Turks, proved pivotal. Their intervention shifted the balance in the Maghreb, sustaining centuries of Muslim rule under reformed institutions influenced by the Turks. Additionally, the controversial tactic of corsairs raiding European shipping aligned with the Mediterranean strategy pursued by the Ottoman Porte in Constantinople.

"Turkey was frequently combated by native North African rulers and never gained any hold over Morocco. But the Turks were nonetheless a powerful ally for Barbary, diverting Christian energies into eastern Europe, threatening Mediterranean communications, and absorbing those forces which might otherwise have turned their attention to reconquest in Africa."

For the first time, the Ottomans ventured into the Maghreb, eventually establishing their governing authority, albeit indirectly, along most of the southern coast of the Mediterranean. Throughout the 16th and subsequent centuries, their empire held a prominent position as the foremost Muslim state globally, serving as Islam's primary focal point. The Ottoman Empire earned recognition as "the leader of all Islam for nearly half a millennium." The Turkish sultan assumed the role of the caliph.

The Spanish-Ottoman truce of 1581 eased the Mediterranean rivalry between these two global powers. Spain retained some of its Maghrebi presidios and ports, such as Melilla and Oran. Both the Spanish and Ottoman Empires had shifted their focus elsewhere. Despite claiming suzerainty over Tunisia for the next three centuries, the Ottomans' effective political control in the Maghreb was short-lived.

=== Ottoman pashas ===
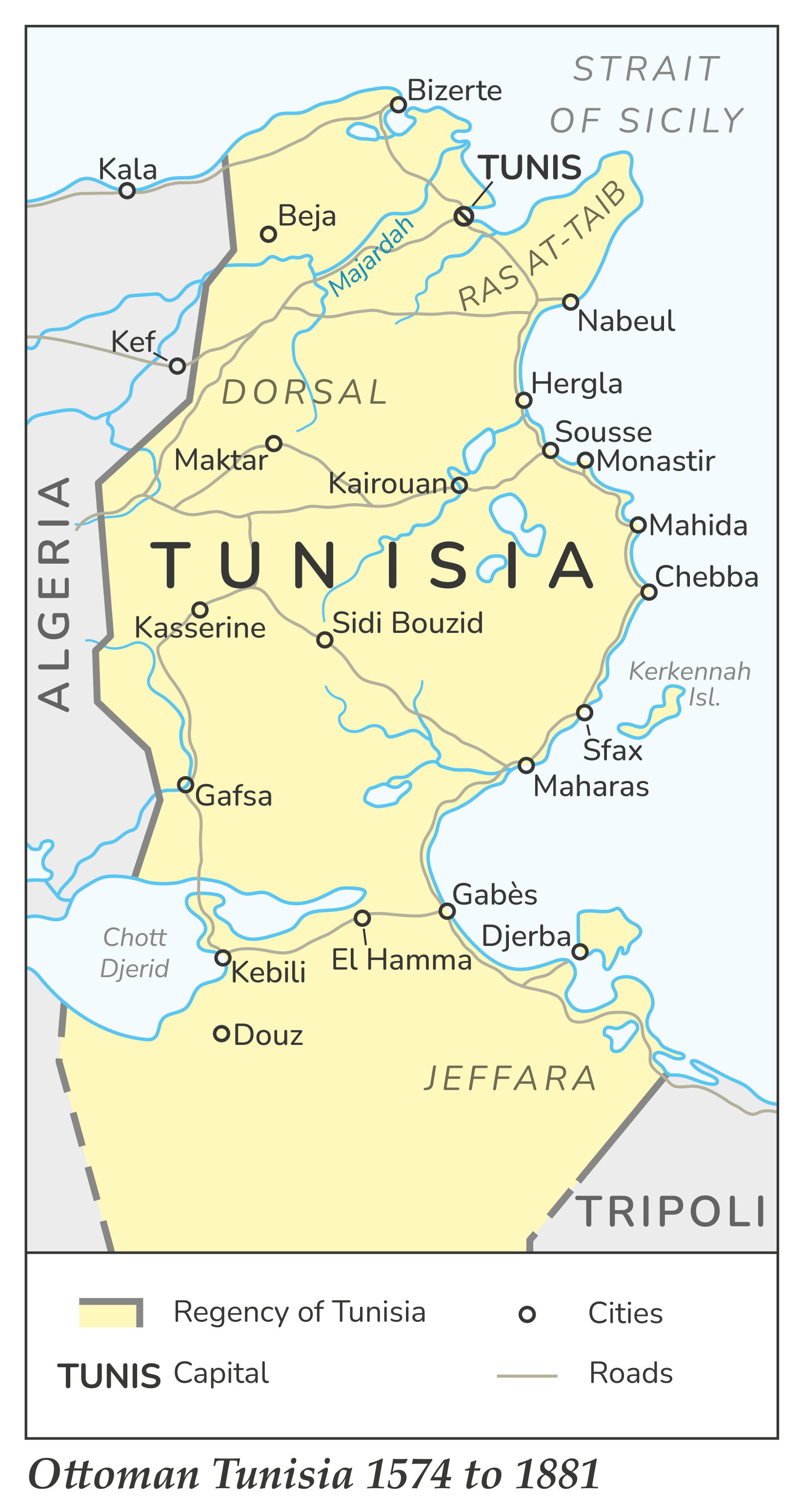
Map of Ottoman Tunisia

After Tunisia fell to the Ottoman Empire, the Porte appointed a pasha to govern. "Pasha" (Turkish: paşa, lit. 'head, chief') was an Ottoman imperial title denoting a high-ranking official with civil or military authority, typically the governor of a province. Those who ruled Tunis, generally also ruled Tripolitania, until when Uluj Ali, the beylerbey of Algiers, died in 1587, the Ottoman sultan abolished the position, signifying the normalization of administration in the Maghrebi provinces after the prolonged conflict with Spain. Instead, for each province (present-day Algeria, Libya, Tunisia), the office of pasha was established to oversee provincial governance.

Thus, in 1587, a pasha assumed the role of Ottoman governor of Tunisia. The pasha was assisted by a bey, who was responsible for the collection of state revenue. From 1574 to 1591, a council known as the Diwan, composed of senior Turkish military officials (buluk-bashis) and local dignitaries, provided counsel to the pasha. Turkish remained the language of administration. With the establishment of permanent Ottoman rule in 1574, the government of Tunis gained a degree of stability, contrasting with the insecurity and uncertainty brought by the previous periods of war.

However, the tenure of the new Ottoman Pasha in Tunisia proved to be short-lived. Just four years later, in 1591, a revolt among the occupying Turkish forces, particularly the janissaries, propelled a new military leader, the Dey, to prominence, effectively supplanting the pasha and assuming ruling authority in Tunis. While the pasha's role diminished, they continued to be appointed intermittently by the Ottoman Porte. Over the following decades, however, the bey of Tunis began to incorporate the title of pasha into his office, and subsequently, the bey's authority eclipsed that of the dey. Eventually, the bey of Tunis emerged as the sole ruling authority, maintaining a distinct separation from Ottoman attempts to challenge their political dominance. The beys of Tunis, like the deys, held the esteemed title of pasha, which carried religious significance as it was directly associated with the Ottoman Caliph, who bore the honorific title of "Commander of the Faithful" (Arb: Amīr al-Mu'minīn).

=== Janissary Deys ===
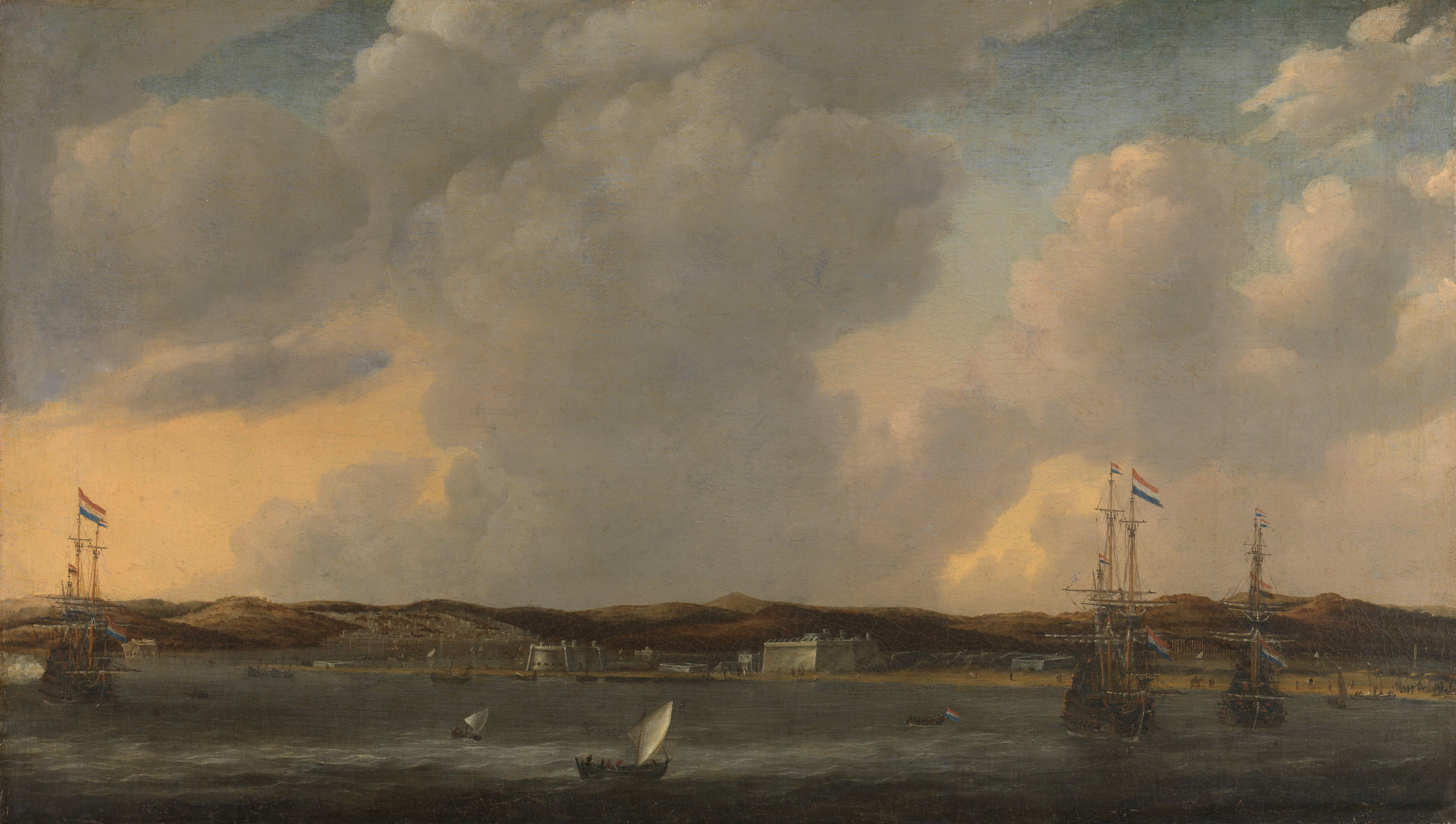
Dutch ships before Tunis, by Reinier Nooms.

Until 1591, the janissaries corps in Tunisia where under the authority of the local Ottoman Pasha. However, in that year, junior officers of the janissaries, known as deys, revolted against their senior officers, compelling the Pasha to recognize the leadership of one of their own. This newly appointed leader, known as the Dey, was elected by his fellow deys and assumed control over law enforcement and military affairs in the capital, effectively becoming the de facto ruler of the country. Although this change challenged the authority of the Ottoman Empire, from the Tunisian perspective, political power remained in the hands of foreigners. The existing state council, known as the diwan, was dissolved, but to placate local sentiments, some Tunisian Maliki jurists were appointed to key positions, although Hanafi jurists of Ottoman origin continued to dominate. The janissary Dey enjoyed considerable discretion in exercising his authority, although initially, his jurisdiction was primarily confined to Tunis and other urban centers.

Two highly effective Deys were Uthman Dey (1593–1610) and his son-in-law Yusuf Dey (r. 1610–1637). These capable administrators exhibited tact, thereby enhancing the dignity of their office. Neither inclined toward luxury, they directed treasury funds toward public projects and infrastructure development, including the construction of mosques, fortresses, barracks, and the repair of aqueducts. They successfully quelled rebellious tribes, bringing an end to an extended period of social unrest in Tunisia. The resulting peace and order facilitated a degree of prosperity. The authority of the Dey was reinforced by the Captain of the Corsair fleet and the Bey, who were responsible for tax collection.

However, during Yusuf Dey's reign, various interest groups emerged and worked to undermine his governing strategies. Many of these groups were Tunisian, including the local military, urban notables (including those from the disbanded diwan), and most rural tribes, with the distant Sultan in Constantinople also exerting influence to some extent. Throughout the 1620s and 1630s, the local Turkish Bey successfully enlisted these social forces, thereby bolstering his own authority and eventually surpassing the Dey. The waning political power of the Dey and his janissaries became evident when their attempted uprising in 1673 failed to regain power.

=== Muradid Beys ===
The Bey (Turkish: gazi, commander) in Tunisia held the foremost position overseeing internal administration and tax collection. Specifically, the Bey was responsible for managing and gathering taxes in the tribal rural areas. Biannually, armed expeditions (mahallas) traversed the countryside, demonstrating central authority. To aid in this task, the Bey organized rural cavalry (sipahis) as an auxiliary force, primarily composed of Arabs recruited from what became known as "government" (makhzan) tribes.

Ramadan Bey had been a patron to a Corsican named Murad Curso since his youth. After Ramadan's death in 1613, Murad succeeded him as Bey, serving effectively from 1613 to 1631. He was eventually appointed as Pasha, though by then it was a ceremonial role, with his position as Bey remaining subordinate to the Dey. His son Hamuda Bey, ruling from 1631 to 1666, secured both titles with the backing of local Tunisian dignitaries. As Pasha, the Bey gained social standing through his connection to the Sultan-Caliph in Constantinople. In 1640, upon the Dey's death, Hamuda Bey maneuvered to control appointments to that office, consolidating his authority as the supreme ruler of Tunisia.

Under Murad II Bey (reigned 1666–1675), the Diwan resumed its role as a council of notables. In 1673, the Janissaries rose in revolt, sensing a decline in their power. During the ensuing conflict, the Janissaries and urban forces, led by the Deys, clashed with the Muradid Beys. They received support from rural factions led by tribal shaykhs, as well as from prominent city figures. As the Beys emerged victorious, so did the rural Bedouin leaders and Tunisian notables, leading to the reinstatement of Arabic as the official language. However, the Muradids maintained the use of Turkish in the central government, reinforcing their elite status and ties to the Ottoman Empire.

At the death of Murad II Bey, internal strife erupted within the Muradid family, leading to an armed conflict known as the Revolutions of Tunis or the Muradid War of Succession (1675–1705). The rulers of Algeria later intervened on behalf of one faction in this domestic turmoil, prolonging their stay even after the fighting subsided, which proved unpopular. Tunisia remained embroiled in civil discord and faced interference from Algeria. The last Muradid Bey was assassinated in 1702 by Ibrahim Sharif, who subsequently ruled for several years with Algerian support. Consequently, the reign of the Muradid Beys lasted from 1640 to 1702.

During the Muradid era (circa the 1630s–1702), there was a gradual economic shift characterized by a decline in corsair raiding due to increased European pressure. This period saw a rise in commercial trading focused on agricultural products, primarily grains, facilitated by integrating the rural population into regional networks. However, Mediterranean trade continued to be dominated by European shipping companies. To maximize profits from export trade, the Beys established government monopolies to regulate transactions between local producers and foreign merchants. Consequently, the rulers and their foreign-connected business associates, who were part of the Turkish-speaking ruling elite, disproportionately benefited from Tunisia's trading profits. This hindered the development of local business interests, including rural landowners and wealthy merchants. The social stratification persisted, with prominent families in Tunisia being recognized as part of the "Turkish" ruling caste.

=== Husainid Beys ===
After 1705, the Bey of Tunisia was held by the Husaynid dynasty, which effectively governed Tunisia as a hereditary monarchy from 1705 to 1881. Although formally considered vassals of the Ottoman Empire until the 19th century, the beys of Tunis enjoyed a significant degree of independence and often conducted their own foreign affairs.

The founder of the dynasty, Husayn ibn Ali (r. 1705–1735), originally an Ottoman cavalry officer (agha of the spahis) of Cretan descent, ascended to power in 1705. His military units were part of the Tunisian forces that repelled an Algerian invasion at the time. Subsequently, the Turkish janissary corps appointed their own Dey as the new ruler. However, Husayn ibn Ali defied the Dey and garnered support from Tunisian khassa (notables), the ulama (religious scholars), and local tribes, despite being a Turkish-speaking outsider. By mobilizing native loyalties against the Turkish soldiery, he emerged victorious. As ruler, he aimed to portray himself as a popular Muslim leader invested in local welfare and prosperity. He appointed a Tunisian Maliki jurist as the qadi instead of a Hanafi preferred by the Ottomans and curtailed the legal authority of the janissaries and the Dey. During his reign as Bey of Tunis, Husayn b. Ali supported agriculture, particularly the cultivation of olive orchards, and initiated public works projects, including mosques and madrassas (schools). His popularity was evident in 1715 when the Ottoman fleet's kapudan-pasha arrived in Tunis with a new governor to replace him; however, Husayn Bey convened a council comprising local civil and military leaders who rallied behind him, prompting the Ottoman Empire to relent.

In 1735, a succession dispute arose between his nephew Ali (r. 1735–1755) and his son Muhammad (r. 1755–1759), who contested his cousin's claim. A bitter civil war ensued, culminating in 1740 with Ali's tenuous triumph. However, in 1756, after another decade of conflict, Muhammad ultimately prevailed, albeit not without continued interference from Algeria.

Early Husaynid policy necessitated a delicate equilibrium among several disparate factions: the distant Ottomans, the Turkish-speaking elite in Tunisia, and local Tunisians (including urban and rural dwellers, notables, clerics, landowners, and remote tribal leaders). To avoid entanglement with the Ottoman Empire, which could encroach on the Bey's authority, religious connections to the Ottoman Caliphate were cultivated, bolstering the prestige of the Beys and garnering approval from local ulama and deference from notables. While janissaries continued to be recruited, tribal forces were increasingly relied upon. Although Turkish remained the language of the elite, Arabic gained prominence in government affairs. Kouloughlis (offspring of mixed Turkish and Tunisian parentage) and native Tunisian notables gained greater access to higher positions and decision-making processes. Unlike intermarrying with Tunisians, the Husaynid Beys often sought marriage alliances through the institution of mamluks, who also occupied elite roles. The dynasty maintained its Ottoman identity and associated privileges. Nevertheless, local ulama were courted, with funding allocated for religious education and support for clerics. Local Maliki jurists were integrated into government service, while rural marabouts were appeased. Tribal shaykhs received recognition and were invited to conferences. At the apex, a select few prominent families, predominantly Turkish-speaking, were favored with business opportunities, land grants, and key government positions, contingent upon their loyalty.

The French Revolution and its repercussions disrupted European economic activity, causing shortages that created business opportunities for Tunisia. With goods in high demand but scarce supply, substantial profits could be generated. Hammouda Pasha (r. 1782–1813), the fifth Bey of Tunis, was highly capable and respected, presiding over this period of prosperity. He successfully repelled an Algerian invasion in 1807 and suppressed a janissary revolt in 1811.

After the Congress of Vienna in 1815, Britain and France secured the Bey's agreement to halt sponsoring or permitting corsair raids, which had resumed during the Napoleonic conflict. Although there was a brief resurgence of raids, they eventually ceased. In the 1820s, economic activity in Tunisia experienced a sharp decline. The Tunisian government was particularly affected due to its monopoly positions in many export sectors. Credit was obtained to weather the deficits, but eventually, the debt grew to unmanageable levels. Tunisia had sought to modernize its commerce and trade, but various foreign business interests began to exert increasing control over domestic markets. Imports of European manufactures often altered consumer pricing, adversely affecting Tunisian artisans whose goods struggled to compete. Foreign trade became a conduit for entrenching European influence.

=== Establishment of French colonial rule ===
In 1881, the French invaded Tunisia, using a border skirmish as a pretext. With the signing of the Treaty of Bardo later that year, a French protectorate was imposed over the country, lasting until 1956. Although the Ottoman sultan officially rejected the Bardo Treaty, no attempt was made to stop the French takeover. During this period of colonial rule, the beylical institution was retained, with the Husaynid Bey serving as titular head of state, while the French effectively governed the country. Upon achieving full independence, Tunisia declared itself a republic in 1957, leading to the termination of the beylical office and the end of the Husaynid dynasty.

== Ottoman cultural influence ==
Ottoman influence enriched Tunisia with its distinct culture and institutions, which diverged notably from the Arab world and the Maghreb. Turkic culture, heavily inspired by Islam and the Central Asian roots of the Turkic people, influenced life in Ottoman Tunisia. For instance, Turks crafted their gazi sagas of frontier warfare, drawing inspiration from Islamic traditions of early Arab conquests, yet infused with legends from the steppes of Central Asia. Due to the challenges of governance and its extensive geographical reach, the Ottoman state played a pivotal role in shaping Muslim legal developments for centuries. Imperial law drew from various sources, including Islamic fiqh (sharia), Roman-Byzantine legal codes, and the traditions of the Turkish and Mongol empires of Central Asia. The Turkish jurist Ebu us-Suud Efendi (c.1490–1574) was credited with harmonizing the regulations of the secular state (qanun) and Islamic law (şeriat) for use in Ottoman courts.

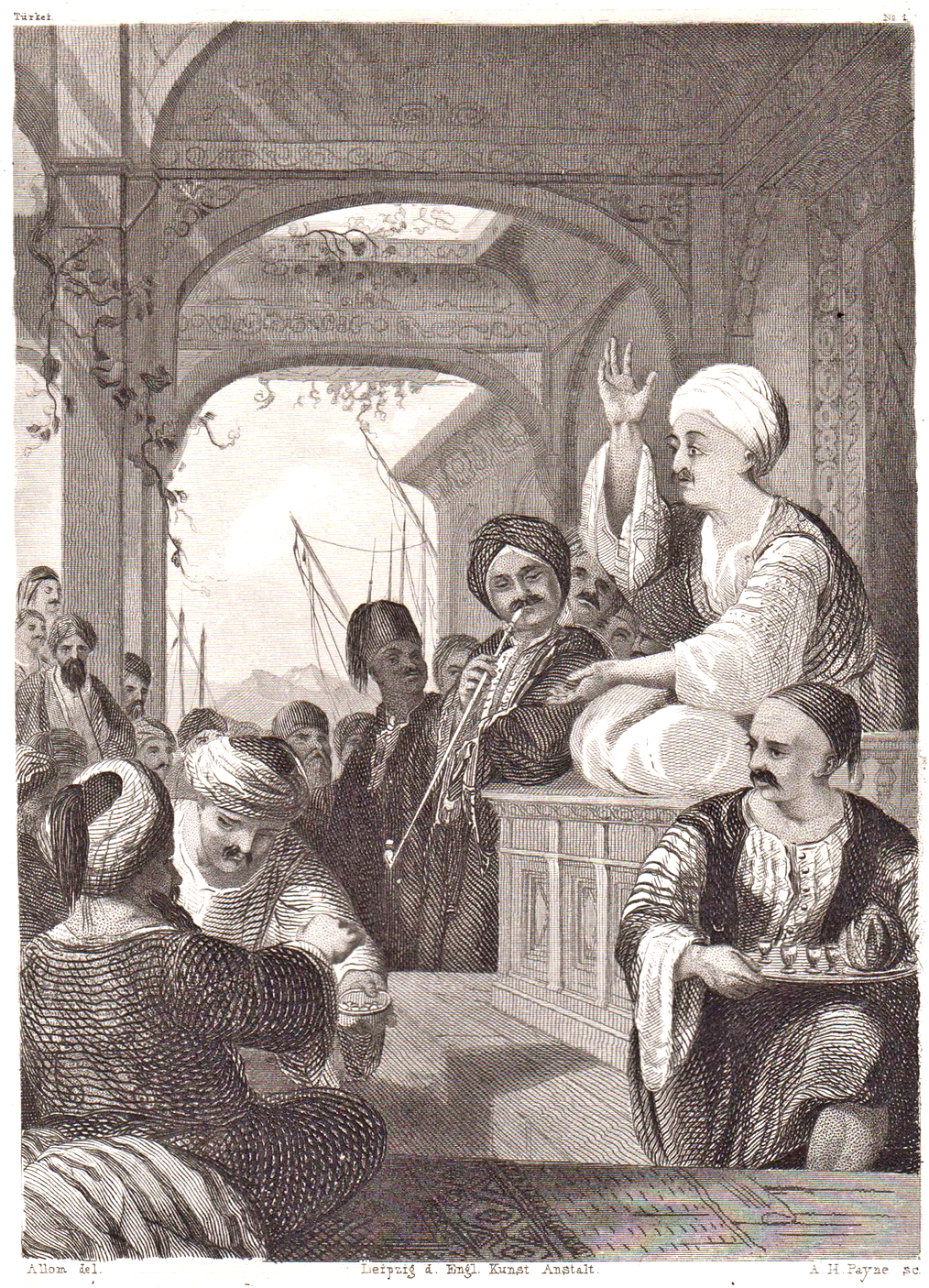
Storyteller (meddah) at a coffee house in the Ottoman Empire.

Ottoman popular literature and much of the learning of its elites were expressed in the Turkish language. Turkish became the language of state affairs in Tunisia. Turkish also "played a vital role in the intellectual life" of Tunisia, particularly when it came to religion and theology. Moreover, the Turks introduced their popular customs, including their music, attire, and the institution of the coffee house (kahvehane or "kiva han").

However, in some areas the Ottomans clashed with the established order in Tunisia. While the Ottomans favored the Hanifi school of law, Tunisia's ulema largely adhered to the Maliki school of thought. Certain concessions were made, some Tunisian Maliki jurists were accepted into administrative and judicial roles. Nevertheless, governance remained in the hands of a foreign elite. In the countryside, Turkish rule was decidedly unpopular, mainly due to the cruel and uncaring nature of soldiers towards local tribes and their grievances. "The Ottomans' military prowess enabled them to subdue the tribes rather than alleviate their grievances, fostering an image of Turkish dominance and Tunisian subordination." The rural economy remained largely beyond the effective reach of central authority. Government revenues relied heavily on Barbary corsair raids against Mediterranean shipping, which proved more profitable than trade. With the Spanish-Ottoman accord in 1581, Spain shifted its focus, leading to increased corsair activity and a decline in peaceful trade and commerce.

The arrival of a Turkish-speaking ruling elite in Tunisia, whose institutions held sway over governance for centuries, indirectly influenced the enduring linguistic divide between Berber and Arabic in settled areas. The 11th-century invasion by the Arabic-speaking Banu Hilal had reignited this dichotomy in linguistic culture. Consequently, Arabic gained dominance, leading to the gradual erosion of Berber usage. The presence of a Turkish-speaking elite appeared to accelerate the decline of Berber speech in Tunisia.

== Military ==
=== Janissaries ===
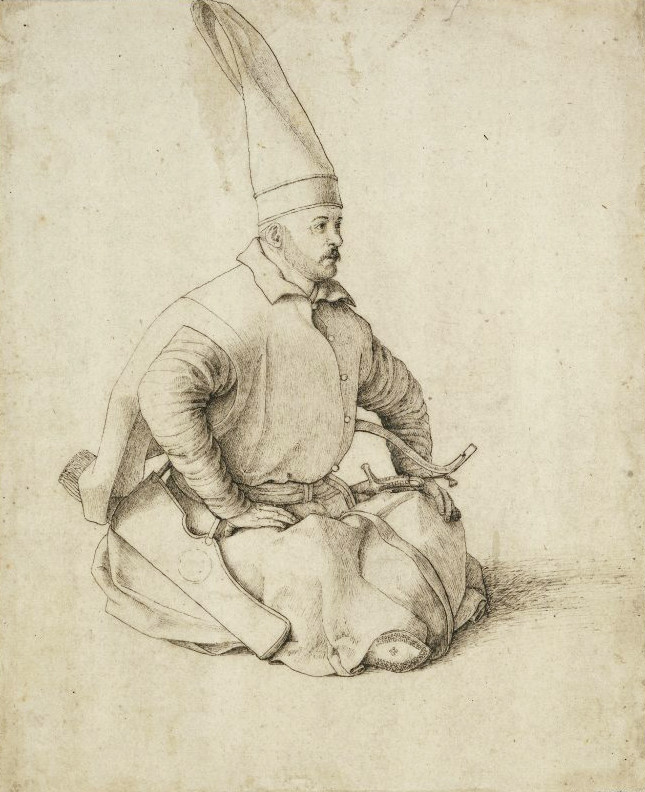
A Janissary (15th century), depicted in a drawing by Gentile Bellini of Venice.

The Ottomans initially stationed 4,000 janissaries in Tunis, drawn from their occupying forces in Algiers, primarily consisting of Turkish troops recruited from Anatolia. The janissary corps operated under the direct command of their Agha (Trk: "master"). Junior officers, known as deys ("maternal uncle"), led units of about 100 soldiers each. Following this, the Ottoman Porte did not maintain the janissary ranks in Tunis but appointed a pasha for Tunisia to oversee recruitment from various regions. The janissaries, also called "yeni-cheri" or "new troops," constituted an elite institution unique to the Ottoman state, though with historical antecedents. The devshirme practice involved impressing Christian youth, often from Greece and the Balkans, into military service and obliging them to convert to Islam. These recruits underwent rigorous training and lived under strict regulations, regimented by the tenets of the Hurufi sect, later known as the Bektashi Sufi order. Initially akin to slavery in the 15th century, janissaries later gained privileges and could ascend to high positions. Symbolized by the massive "Kazan" (kettle) where they congregated, janissaries evolved into a powerful caste, numbering over 130,000 by the 19th century before the institution was dissolved. They wielded considerable influence and were prone to riot and looting if not satisfied, leading to the downfall of several Sultans.

In the Maghreb under Ottoman rule, the janissaries were initially Turkish or Turkish-speaking. There was some rivalry between the janissaries and the pirates, who were predominantly composed of Christian renegades. Additionally, the janissaries were regarded with suspicion by local tribal forces and the Maghreb militias as potential enemy combatants. Collectively known as the "ojaq" (Trk: "hearth"), the janissary corps maintained a strong sense of unity and élan.

"They possessed a high sense of group solidarity and egalitarian spirit in the ranks, and elected their commander-in-chief, the agha, and a diwan [council] which protected their group interests. Being Turkish, they enjoyed a privileged position in the state: they were not subject to the regular system of justice in the regency and were entitled to rations of bread, meat, and oil, to a regular salary, and a proportion of the yields of piracy."

=== Corsairs ===
A distinction can be made between a pirate (or privateer) and a pirate based on the former operating under explicit government authority, while the latter lacks official authorization. The Mediterranean region during the late Middle Ages and Renaissance witnessed widespread piracy (and privateering) practiced by both Christians (targeting Muslim shipping in the east) and Muslims (more active along the Barbary Coast in the west, targeting Christian merchant ships).

The first "great age of the Barbary corsairs" occurred in the 16th century, between 1538 and 1571. Ottoman sea power in the Mediterranean was supreme during these decades following their naval victory at the Battle of Preveza. However, Ottoman supremacy was effectively broken at the Battle of Lepanto, although Ottoman sea power remained formidable. In the early 17th century, corsair activity again peaked. Afterward, Algiers began to rely more on "tribute" from European nations in exchange for safe passage rather than attacking merchant ships individually. The Ottoman Empire's treaties with European states added a layer of conflicting diplomacy. Lastly, during the wars following the French Revolution (1789–1815), Barbary corsair activity briefly spiked before abruptly ending.

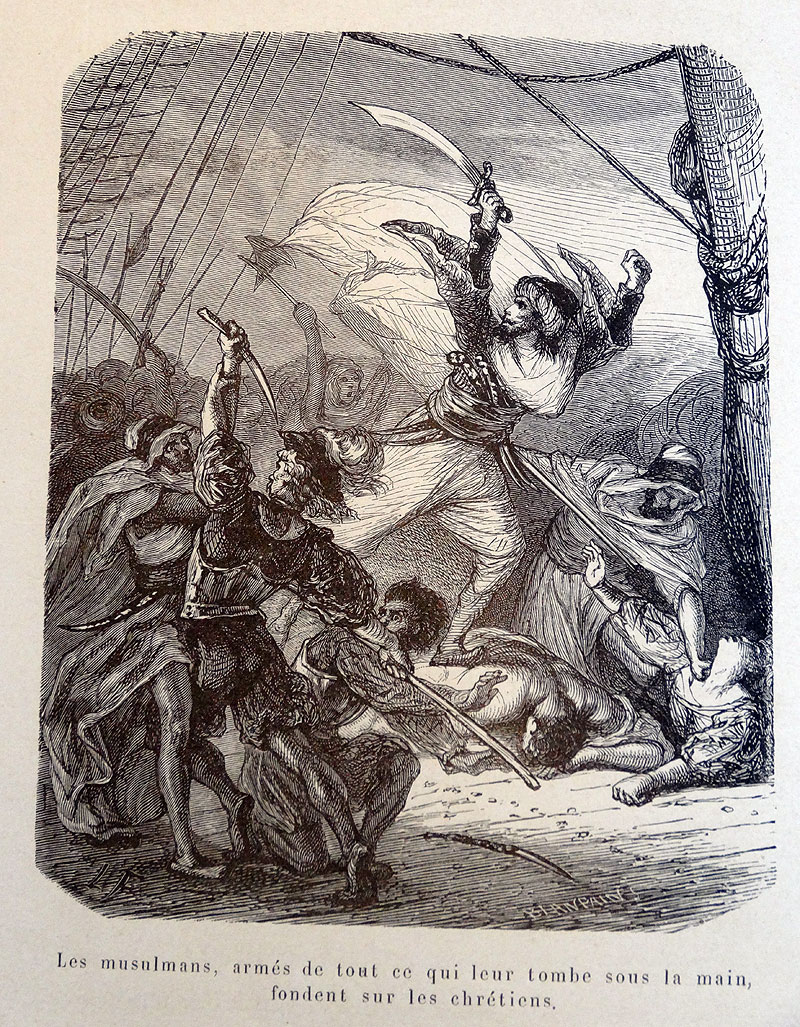
Barbary corsair leader Aruj boarding a galley.

In 16th-century Algiers, under the new Ottoman regime, the customs and practices of the pre-existing Barbary corsairs underwent significant transformation, evolving into impressive institutions. The activity became highly developed, featuring modes of recruitment, hierarchical structures within the corps, peer review systems, both private and public financing, trades, and material support, as well as coordinated operations and markets for resale and ransom. The policies established in Algiers served as an exemplary model of Corsair business, often referred to as the "life reisi," or "board of captains." This model was later adopted by Tunis and Tripoli and independently by Morocco.

Crews were sourced from three main groups: Christian renegades (which included many famous or notorious captains), foreign Muslims – primarily Turkish, and a small number of native Maghrebis. It was rare for a native to achieve high rank, although Reis Hamida, a Kabyle Berber, managed to do so during the later years of the corsair era. Captains were selected by the ship's owners from a list compiled by a select few Riesi, an authoritative council consisting of all active Corsair captains. Residence locations were also regulated, with captains, crews, and suppliers all residing in the western quarter of Algiers, along the harbor and docks.

Private capital typically funded Corsair activity. Investors purchased shares in specific Corsair business ventures, drawn from various levels of society, including merchants, officials, janissaries, shopkeepers, and artisans. This financing provided the necessary funds for the capital and expenses of ships and crews, including naval stores, supplies, timber, canvas, and munitions.

"Because of the potential profits from Corsair prizes, the underwriting of expeditions was an attractive proposition. Shareholding was organized like that of a modern stock company, with the return to individuals dependent on their investment. This type of private investment peaked in the seventeenth century, the 'golden age.'"

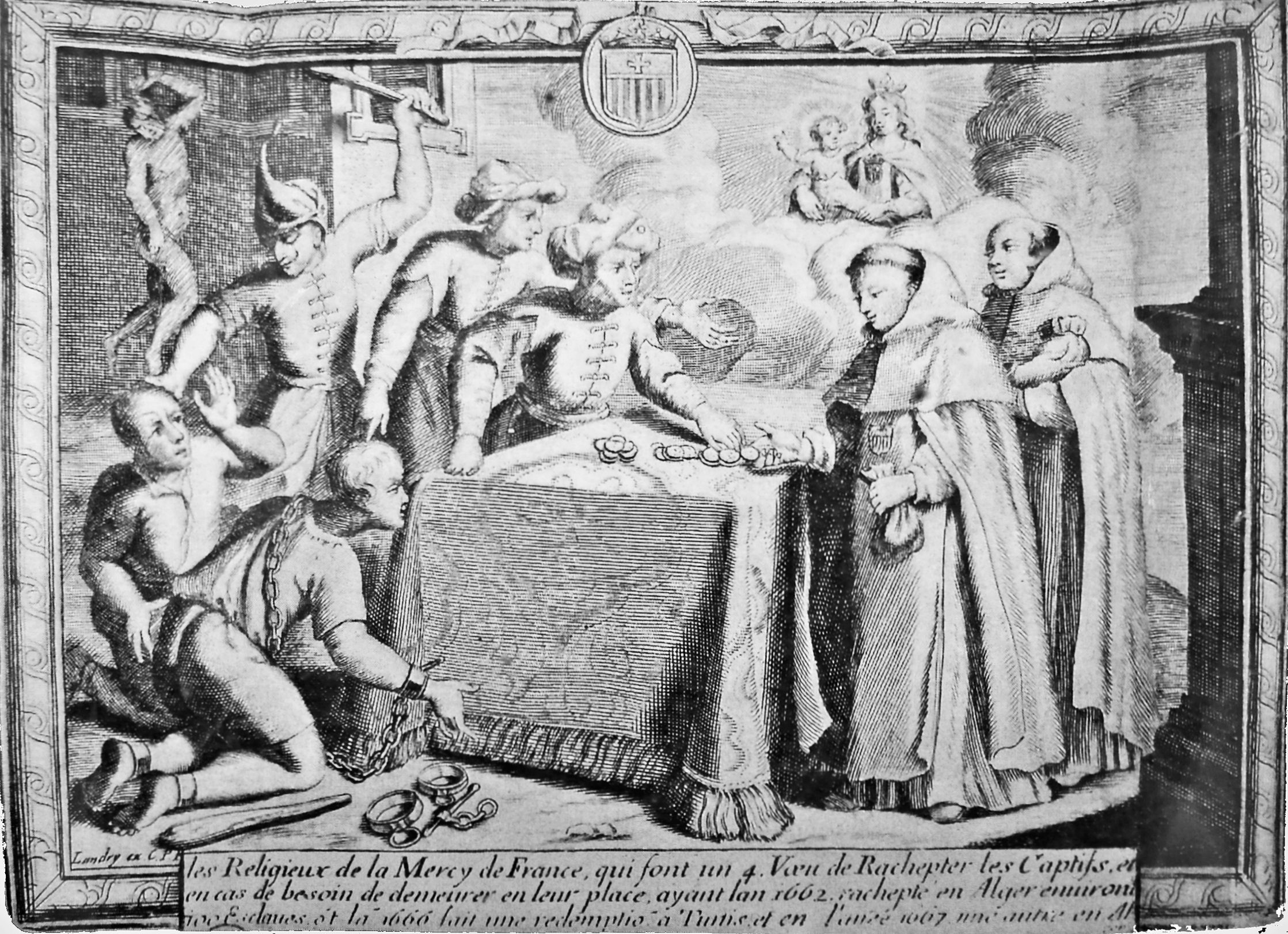
Ransom of Christians held in Barbary during the 17th century.

After the pirate "golden age," the state of Algiers, primarily under the control of its Turkish janissaries, came to own many of the Corsair vessels and finance their expeditions. Strict rules governed the division of the prizes captured at sea. First, Algiers received its share as the state representative of Allah; next came the port authorities, customs brokers, and sanctuary keepers; then, the portion due to the ship owners, captain, and crew followed. The seized merchant cargo was typically sold at auction or, more commonly, to European commercial representatives residing in Algiers, through whom it might even reach its original destination port.

Ransom or selling captured prisoners (and auctioning cargo) was the primary source of private wealth in Algiers. Payment for captives was financed and negotiated by religious societies. The conditions of captivity varied, with most captives being employed as slave labor. Muslim masters sometimes granted these Christian captives religious privileges. In Algiers during the early 17th century, more than 20,000 Christian prisoners were held from various countries. Captives were considered a source of greater profit than looted merchandise in Barbary, while in Tunis, corsair activity never reached the prominence it did in Algiers.

== Architecture ==
After the establishment of Ottoman authority in the region, architecture in both Tunisia and Algeria was influenced by Ottoman architecture, particularly in the coastal cities where Ottoman influence was strongest. Additionally, some European influences were introduced, notably through the importation of materials such as marble from Italy.

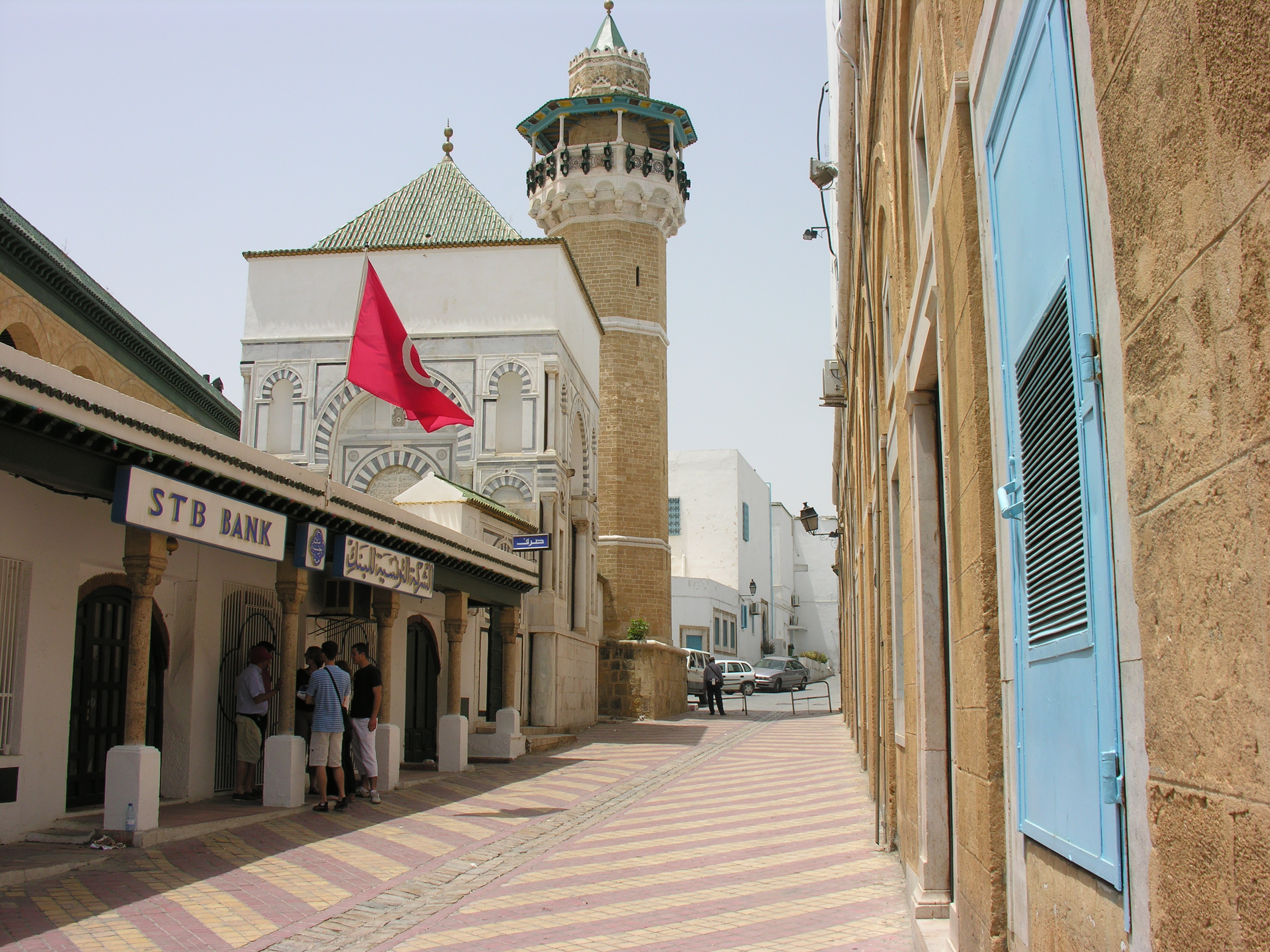
Youssef Dey Mosque complex in Tunis (c. 1614–1639), with mausoleum and minaret visible

In Tunis, the Mosque complex of Yusuf Dey, built or begun around 1614–15 by Yusuf Dey (r. 1610–1637), is one of the earliest and most important examples that incorporated Ottoman elements into local architecture. Its congregational mosque is accompanied by a madrasa, a primary school, fountains, latrines, and even a café, many of which provided revenues for the upkeep of the complex. This arrangement resembles Ottoman külliye complexes and marked the first example of a "funerary mosque" in Tunis, with the founder's mausoleum (dated to 1639) attached to it. While the hypostyle form of the mosque and the pyramidal roof of the mausoleum reflect traditional architecture in the region, the octagonal shaft of the minaret reflects the influence of the "pencil"-shaped Ottoman minarets. During this period, octagonal minarets often characterized mosques following the Hanafi maddhab associated with the Ottomans, while mosques adhering to the Maliki maddhab, predominant in the Maghreb, continued to feature traditional square (cuboid) minarets.

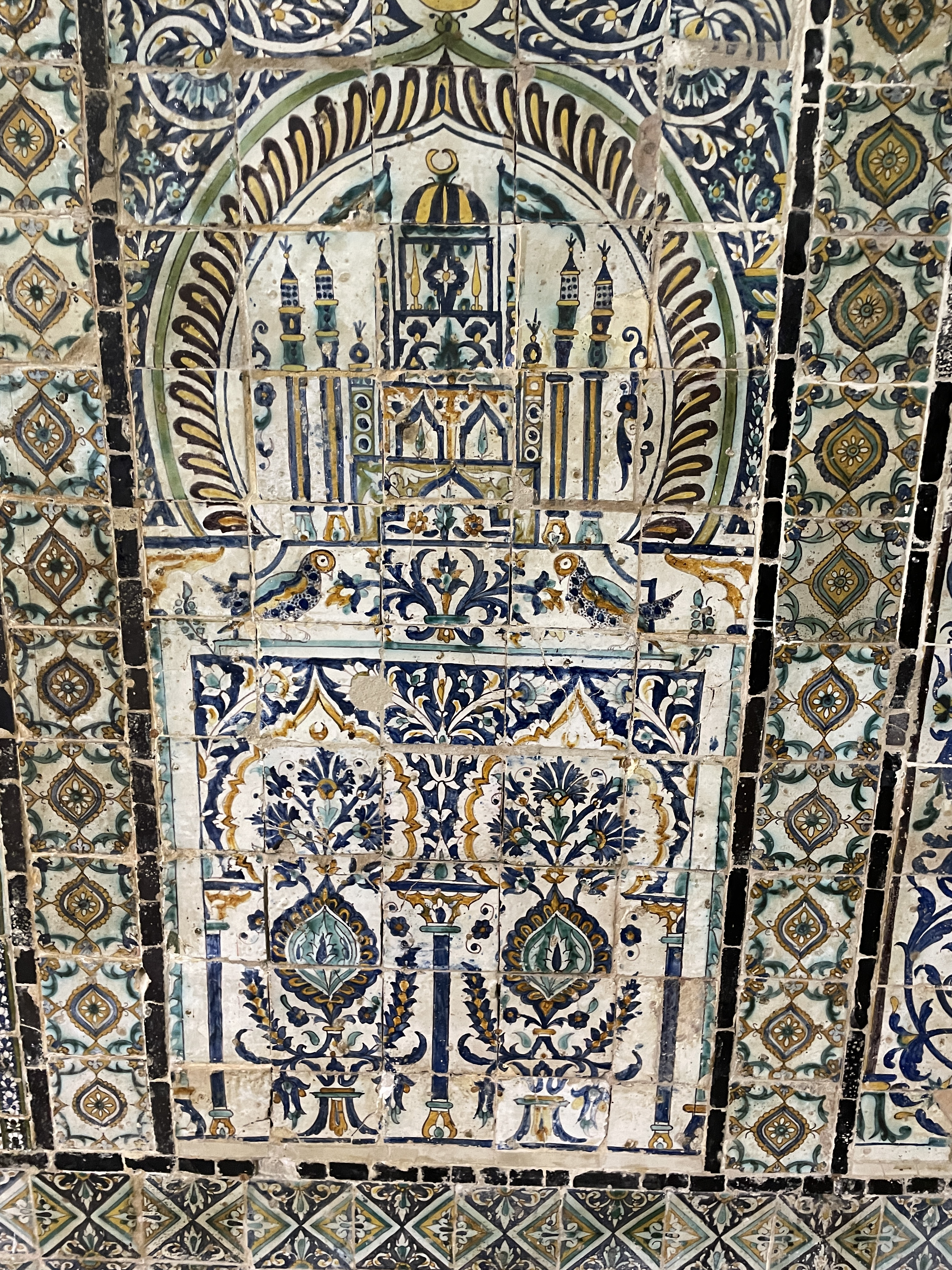
Panel of Qallalin tiles in the Bardo Museum (18th century)

Hammuda Pasha (r. 1631–1664), one of the Muradid Beys, initiated a significant restoration and expansion of the Zawiya of Abu al-Balawi or "Mosque of the Barber" in Kairouan, starting in 1629. This complex, which underwent further modifications, exemplifies the use of underglaze-painted Qallalin tiles for decoration, a characteristic feature of this period. These tiles, typically produced in the Qallalin district of Tunis, are adorned with motifs of vases, plants, and arches, and are distinguished by their predominant use of blue, green, and ochre-like yellow colors, setting them apart from contemporary Ottoman tiles. The artistic height of these tiles was in the 17th and 18th centuries.

It wasn't until the late 17th century that Tunisia saw the construction of its first and only mosque featuring an Ottoman-style dome: the Sidi Mahrez Mosque. This mosque, initiated by Muhammad Bey and completed under his successor, Ramadan ibn Murad, between 1696 and 1699, showcases a dome system characteristic of Classical Ottoman architecture. This architectural style, first used by Sinan in the construction of the Şehzade Mosque (circa 1548) in Istanbul, consists of a central dome accompanied by four semi-domes, supplemented by four smaller domes at the corners and pendentives in the transition areas between the semi-domes. Inside, the mosque features marble paneling and decorative tiles reminiscent of Ottoman Iznik tiles.

Husayn ibn Ali (r. 1705–1735), the founder of the Husaynid dynasty, oversaw the expansion of the Bardo Palace, the traditional residence of Tunisian rulers dating back to the 15th century. He transformed it into an expansive complex enclosed by a fortified wall, which included a mosque, a madrasa, a hammam (public bath), and a market adjacent to the palace. Subsequent beys further modified and expanded the palace complex, a process that continued into the early 21st century. Today, it serves as the home of the national museum and the National Assembly.

== Flags ==
Flag of Tunisia in 1685.

Flag of Tunisia as depicted in the Flag Chart by B. Lems in 1700.

== See also ==
- Turks in Tunisia
- Tunisian Italians
- Tunisian campaign
- History of Tunisia
- History of Africa
