= Constantine campaign (1699–1700) =

1699 battle in Algeria

Coordinates: 36°21′0″N 6°36′0″E

- Part of the Maghrebi war (1699–1702)
| Date | 1699–1700 |
| Location | Beylik of Constantine |
| Result | Tunisian victory: Stalemate at Constantine |
| Territorial changes | Tunisia captures most of eastern Algeria until the Battle of Jouami' al-Ulama |

Belligerents
| Beylik of Tunis; Supported by: Pashalik of Tripoli | Regency of Algiers; Beylik of Constantine |

Commanders and leaders
| Murad III Bey; Ibrahim Sharif; Destari Mehmed | Ali Khodja Bey † |

Strength
| Unknown | Unknown |

Casualties and losses
| Unknown | Unknown |
- Location of Constantine in Algeria

The Constantine campaign was launched by Bey of Tunis Murad III Bey in 1699 to capture the Beylik of Constantine, situated in the east of the Deylik of Algiers.

== Background ==
In 1694, the Dey of Algiers Hadj Chabane agreed to help Ben Cheker in conquering the Beylik of Tunis and installing him as Bey but under Algerian vassalage. Supported by Tripolitania, the Regency of Algiers defeated the Tunisian armies in the Battle of Kef and the Siege of Tunis, conquering all of Tunis except the south which was conquered by Tripolitania. The reign of the Algerian vassal ruler Ben Cheker only lasted 6 months before the people of Tunis revolted and crowned Mohammed Bey el-Mouradi as Bey of Tunis once again who returned from exile.

These conflicts led to an alliance between the Sultan of Morocco Ismail Ibn Sharif and the Bey of Tunis Mohammed Bey against the Dey of Algiers Hadj Chabane. Mohammed died in 1696, and was succeeded by Romdhane Bey, who was assassinated in 1699. Finally, Murad III Bey decided to launch the campaign into Algeria with his Moroccan allies. He also signed an alliance with the Pasha of Tripoli.

== Campaign ==
In 1699 Tunisian troops reinforced with Tripolitanian ones invaded the Beylik of Constantine, at the same time as the Moroccan ones invaded western Algeria. The Tunisian army was commanded by Murad III Bey, and his commander Ibrahim Sharif.

The Tunisians quickly advanced into the Algerian territory, capturing key points such as Annaba.

The Bey of Constantine at the time was Ali Khodja Bey. He raised every possible troop he could, and left the eastern parts of the country to the Tunisians. Instead, he organized his armies outside of Constantine, and awaited the Tunisians, whom arrived earlier than he expected. In the battle that ensued the Algerians were decisively defeated, and Ali Khodja was killed alongside 500 other Algerians. Murad then besieged the city for 3 months with little success, after which he left two Mela'abs (camps), one at Coudiat-aty and one at Bardo near the city to continue the siege. While the Tunisians besieged them, the Algerians successfully sent a so-called Ben Zekri to Algiers to urgently request reinforcements. At that time, Murad continued besieging Constantine, and also attempted to pacify other areas such as Sétif. The Dey of Algiers Hadj Mustapha agreed to send an army, which would meet the Tunisians at the Battle of Jouami' al-Ulama.
