= 1591 uprising in Tunis =

- Part of Revolutions of Tunis
Date	October 1591
Location	Tunis, Regency of Tunis (Ottoman Empire)
Result	Establishment of the dey regime; Tunisia becomes a de facto independent state under a dey, nominally under Ottoman suzerainty

Belligerents
Janissary militia (yoldachs)	Ottoman pasha and senior officers (bouloukbashi)

Commanders and leaders
Ismaïl “the Rhodian” (first dey)	Ottoman pasha of Tunis

Casualties and losses
Unknown	c. 80 senior diwan members killed

The Coup d'État of 1591 in Tunis was carried out by the yoldach (junior janissaries) and led to the creation of the office of the Dey. As a result, the Regency of Tunis became de facto independent from the Ottoman Empire.

== Background ==
After the Conquest of Tunis (1574), the Hafsid dynasty was permanently overthrown and the province was integrated into the Ottoman administrative system. The sultan appointed a pasha, sent from Constantinople, whose role was to represent imperial authority. He was supported by a diwan composed of Ottoman officers and trusted administrators.

However, real power on the ground largely depended on the presence of a sizeable janissary garrison stationed in the kasbah of Tunis. This militia was divided into two groups:

- senior officers (bouloukbashi), close to the pasha,
- and yoldachs, lower-ranking soldiers, numerous and often poorly paid.

In 1587, an attempt to strengthen imperial control was made when the sultan appointed a new pasha specifically for Tunis. Instead of restoring authority, this measure increased resentment among the janissaries, who viewed Ottoman interventions from Istanbul as a direct threat to their influence and privileges.

== The 1591 Coup d’État ==
In October 1591, the yoldach janissaries of Tunis revolted against the pasha and the senior officers of the diwan. The mutineers stormed the administrative quarters of the kasbah, assassinating or expelling several high-ranking figures.

Following the overthrow of the pasha's authority, the insurgents elected Ismaïl al-Rūdhānī (“Ismaïl the Rhodian”) as the first dey of Tunis. His election established a new system in which the dey—chosen by the janissary ranks—held real executive power, while the pasha became a ceremonial representative of the distant Ottoman sultan.

The coup reconfigured the entire political structure of the province, strengthening the janissary oligarchy and reducing the direct influence of Istanbul.

== Aftermath ==
The 1591 coup drastically altered the political structure of Ottoman Tunisia. The janissaries became the dominant force, replacing the pasha's authority with that of an elected dey who exercised effective control over the regency. The pasha, still appointed by Istanbul, retained only ceremonial and symbolic functions.

The success of the mutiny marked the beginning of a long period of military dominance, during which the odjak frequently intervened in politics and caused recurrent instability. At the same time, the weakening of central authority allowed the office of the bey—originally responsible for taxation and provincial security—to gain prominence, eventually leading to the rise of the Husainid dynasty in 1705.

Overall, the coup initiated a phase of de facto autonomy for the Regency of Tunis within the Ottoman Empire, with local military institutions exercising increasing control over governance.
