= Siege of Tripoli (1705) =

1705 Tunisia siege of Tripoli

- Part of the Revolutions of Tunis
Date	19 January 1705
Location	Tripoli, Libya
Result	Tripolitanian victory

Belligerents
Ottoman Tripolitania	Ottoman Tunisia

Commanders and leaders
(Ottoman Tripolitania) Bosnak Ismail Pasha	Ibrahim al-Sharif †

The Siege of Tripoli was initiated by the Tunisian bey, Ibrahim al-Sharif, who attempted to "wreak his wrath" on the population of Tripoli. The siege proved unsuccessful as Tunisian troops withdrew from Tripoli.

== Prelude ==
The conflict was triggered by the capture of a ship that was transporting gifts from the governor of Egypt to the Bey of Tunisia by Tripolitania pirates. This incident deeply offended Ibrahim Al-Sharif, a deeply unpopular bey who had risen to power after assassinating Murad III Bey and his family in 1702.

== Siege ==
In response to this perceived slight, Ibrahim Al-Sharif directed his forces towards Tripoli, specifically targeting Khalil Bey, the son-in-law of the ruler of Tripolitania. The siege was characterized by Ibrahim's intention to unleash his fury upon the entire population of Tripoli, causing fear to spread among the inhabitants, including the French, whose consul fled the city in the face of the advancing threat.

== Conclusion ==
In an effort to defend the city, the Jewish community actively participated in fortifying Tripoli's defenses, while Ibrahim's soldiers simultaneously pillaged several nearby villages. Despite the initial aggression, the defenders managed to repel Ibrahim's troops, leading to his eventual retreat and the lifting of the siege.
