= Siege of Tunis (1694) =

1694 siege in Tunisia

Coordinates: 36°48′23″N 10°10′54″E

- Part of the Tunisian–Algerian War (1694)
Date	August–November 1694
Location	Tunis, Tunisia
Result	Algerian victory
Territorial changes	Tunis becomes a beylik of Algiers

Belligerents
Regency of Algiers	Tunisia

Commanders and leaders
Hadj Chabane; Mohammed ben Cheker	Mohammed Bey

Strength
7,600 troops: 2,000 infantry; 2,000 cavalry; 400 janissaries; 3,200 other	15,000 infantry 600 horses
- Location within Tunisia

The siege of Tunis was a siege fought in 1694, between the Deylik of Algiers, and Muradid Tunis, during the Tunisian-Algerian War of 1694.

== Background ==
The Tunisian prince Mohammed ben Cheker asked the dey of Algiers, at the time Hadj Chabane, for help in order to make himself Bey of Tunis. The dey of Algiers accepted his proposal, invaded Tunisia in 1694, and defeated the Tunisian army at the Battle of Kef on June 24. Chabane then marched on Tunis, where Mohammed Bey el-Mouradi took refuge after his defeat. The goal of Chabane was to make Tunis a simple governorate (Beylik) in a similar fashion to the other Beyliks of Algeria, such as the Beylik of Constantine.

== Siege ==
The Algerian army a arrived in front of Tunis in August and started the siege. Despite the efforts of the Tunisian defenders, Tunis fell after 3 months, and the Algerians plundered the city on 12 November 1694, and Tunis fell under the control of the Dey of Algiers, with administration by Chaabane Khodja and Ben Cheker.

Ben Cheker became the Bey of Tunis forcing Mohammed Bey el-Mouradi to flee to Chios or the Sahara.

== Aftermath ==
Mohammed Bey el-Mouradi fled to Chios or the Sahara and Ben Cheker reigned over Tunis for six months as a governor for Algiers, but his reign was tyrannical and led the Tunisians to appeal to Mohammed Bey el-Mouradi in exile The latter defeated Ben Cheker On May 1, 1695 at the Battle of Merguellil, near Kairouan, and made himself bey of Tunis again.
