= Ramadan Bey Square =

Coordinates: 36.7997°N 10.1689°E

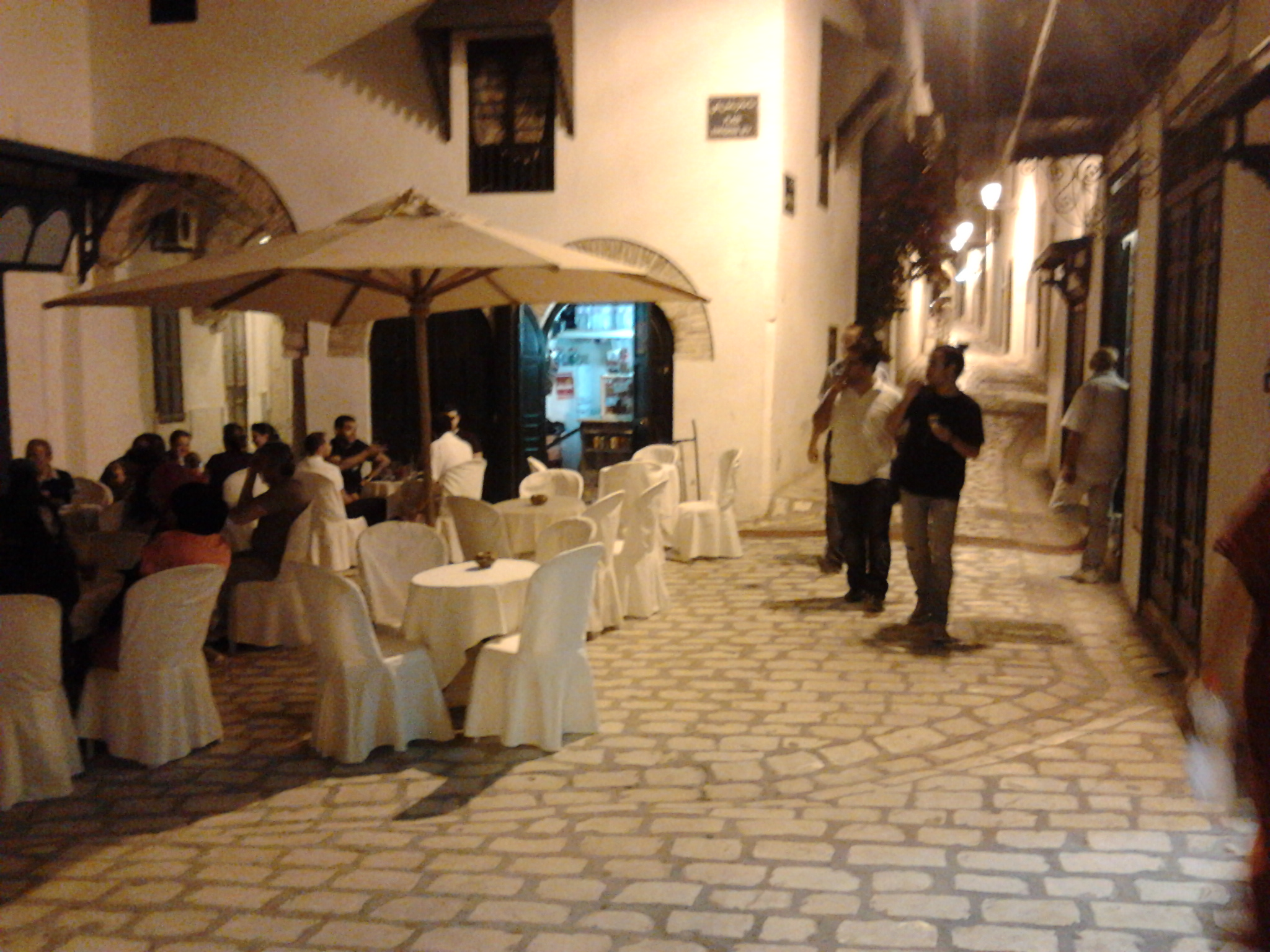
Ramadan Bey Square by night

Ramadan Bey Square (Arabic: ساحة أو بطحاء رمضان باي) is one of the squares in the medina of Tunis.

It was named after Ramadan Bey (or Romdhane Bey), a sovereign from the Muradid dynasty.

== Location ==
Ramadan Bey Square is at the intersection of six streets :

- Pacha street
- Bir Lahjar street
- Sidi Ben Arous street
- Sayda Ajoula street
- The Agha street
- Ben Nejma street
