= Murad I Bey =

Murad I مراد الأول

Bey of Tunis
- Reign: 1613–1631
- Predecessor: Ramadhan Bey
- Successor: Hamuda Bey
- Born: Giacomo Senti; Corsica (Republic of Genoa)
- Died: 1631; Tunisia
- Spouse: Yasmine
- Issue: Hamuda Bey
- Dynasty: Muradids
- Religion: Sunni Islam

Murad Bey (مراد الأول; died 1631) was the first hereditary bey of Tunis, founder of the Muradid dynasty. He reigned from 1613 until his death.

Originally from Corsica and named Giacomo Senti, he was captured by the Tunisian corsairs at the age of nine and bought by the first bey of Tunis, the old mameluke Ramadhan. He was promoted by the bey, who made him his lieutenant (kahia) in 1613, and participated in missions to pacify the hinterland and collect taxes at the head of armed battalions called mhalla. He allied himself to Yusuf Dey and received his old master's position after his death in 1613. He was enriched by the corsairs and subsequently obtained the title of pasha of Tunis from the Ottoman government, along with the right of his son and heir Hamuda Bey to inherit the title of Bey, with the agreement of Yusuf Dey. Thus he became the founder of a dynasty of Beys who came to enjoy a controlling role in the government of Tunisia.

Murad Bey enjoyed the respect of the Ottoman sultan, but also wide administrative autonomy and a unique degree of political independence, without doubt a result of his geographic distance from Constantinople and of the jihad which the Tunisian corsairs carried on against Christendom. In fact, the government of Tunis (the dey, the bey, and the divan) were able to conclude peace treaties and commercial agreements with the rulers of the major states of Europe independently of the Sultan. He contented himself with appointing a pasha, theoretically the supreme representative of the Ottoman government in Tunis, every three years and with receiving the traditional tribute in kind from the diwan on these occasions.

The men in power in Tunis demanded from the cities and tribes of the interior only the minimal level of deference necessary to maintain order and security. The bey did not, legally speaking, exact taxes but only a sort of annual tribute and so long as this was paid he left them to live according to their norms and customs. Under the first Muradid beys, Tunis acquired a real prosperity through commercial activity, piracy, and the regular collection of tribute.

In the domain of art, the Great Mosque of Kairouan received some restoration work in the reign of Murad Bey who wished to leave his mark on the ancient monument, mostly some painted ceilings in the prayer hall. This work is dated to 1028 AH (= 1618).

== Bibliography ==
- Arthur Pellegrin, Histoire illustrée de Tunis et de sa banlieue. éd. Saliba, Tunis, 1955

Preceded by Ramadhan Bey	Bey of Tunis; 1613–1631	Succeeded by Hammuda Pasha Bey
