= Battle of Tlemcen =

Battle of Tlemcen or Tlemcen War may refer to:

- Siege of Tlemcen (1299–1307)
- Siege of Tlemcen (1335–1337)
- Fall of Tlemcen (1518)
- Spanish expedition to Tlemcen (1535)
- Spanish expedition to Tlemcen (1543)
- Campaign of Tlemcen (1551)
- Campaign of Tlemcen (1557)
- Battle of Tlemcen (1700)
