= Mascara campaign (1699–1701) =

- Part of the Maghrebi war (1699–1702)
Date	1699–1701
Location	Beylik of Mascara
Result	Algerian victory

Belligerents
Sultanate of Morocco	Regency of Algiers; Beylik of Mascara

Commanders and leaders
Ismail Ibn Sharif; Moulay Zidan	Hadj Mustapha Dey; Mustapha Bouchelaghem

The Mascara campaign of 1699–1701 was launched by Moulay Zidan, son of the Moroccan Sultan Moulay Ismail, to capture the Beylik of Mascara, situated in the west of the Regency of Algiers. This episode, which ended in 1701 with the Moroccan's defeat at the Battle of Chelif, reopened the hostilities between the Sherifian Empire and the Regency of Algiers.

== Campaign ==
Sometime between 1699 and 1700, Sultan Moulay Ismail ibn Sharif instructed his son Moulay Zidan, to whom he entrusted the command of the province of Taza, to launch an offensive against the Algerians, in coordination with an offensive by the Bey of Tunis Murad III on the Beylik of Constantine, which triggered a two front war against the Deylik of Algiers.

After dismissing his son, Moulay Ismail resumed the campaign and led in person another offensive against the Algerians in 1701. After crossing the Algerian border, he was defeated at the Battle of Chelif.
