= Abu Sahl Khujandi =

Vizier of the Ghaznavids

Abu Sahl Khujandi was a Persian vizier of the Ghaznavid Sultan Ibrahim of Ghazna. Before becoming vizier, Abu Sahl served in the divan of the Ghaznavid Empire, and then succeeded Abu Bakr ibn Abi Salih as the vizier of Ibrahim in 1059. However, Abu Sahl later fell into disfavor, and was imprisoned and blinded.

== Sources ==
- Bosworth, C. E. "ABŪ SAHL ḴOJANDĪ". Encyclopaedia Iranica.
- C. Edmund, Bosworth (1995). The Later Ghaznavids: Splendour and Decay: The Dynasty in Afghanistan and Northern India 1040-1186. ISBN 9788121505772.

Preceded by Abu Bakr ibn Abi Salih	Vizier of the Ghaznavid Empire; 1059 – 11th-century	Unknown
