= Ramadan (Muradid bey) =

Ramadan Bey
- Bey of Tunis
- Reign: 14 October 1696 – 16 March 1699
- Predecessor: Mohamed Bey El Mouradi
- Successor: Murad III Bey
- Died: 16 March 1699

Ramadan Bey (Arabic: رمضان باي المرادي; died 16 March 1699) was a Muradid leader and Bey of Tunis from 1696 until his assassination in 1699. He was the youngest son of Murad II Bey.

== Biography ==
Before his accession to power, he remained away from the infighting which his older brothers Mohamed Bey and Ali Bey took part, known today as the Revolutions of Tunis.

Preferring the pleasures of life to those of power, he let his mamluk Mazhud, a renegade of Neapolitan origin and a distinguished musician, manage the affairs of the state and he rarely left his palace in Dar El Bey. Suspecting his nephew Murad III Bey of sedition, Ramadan had him arrested and demanded that the young prince have his eyes gouged out. Murad escaped and eventually deposed him and then ordered his assassination in March 1699.

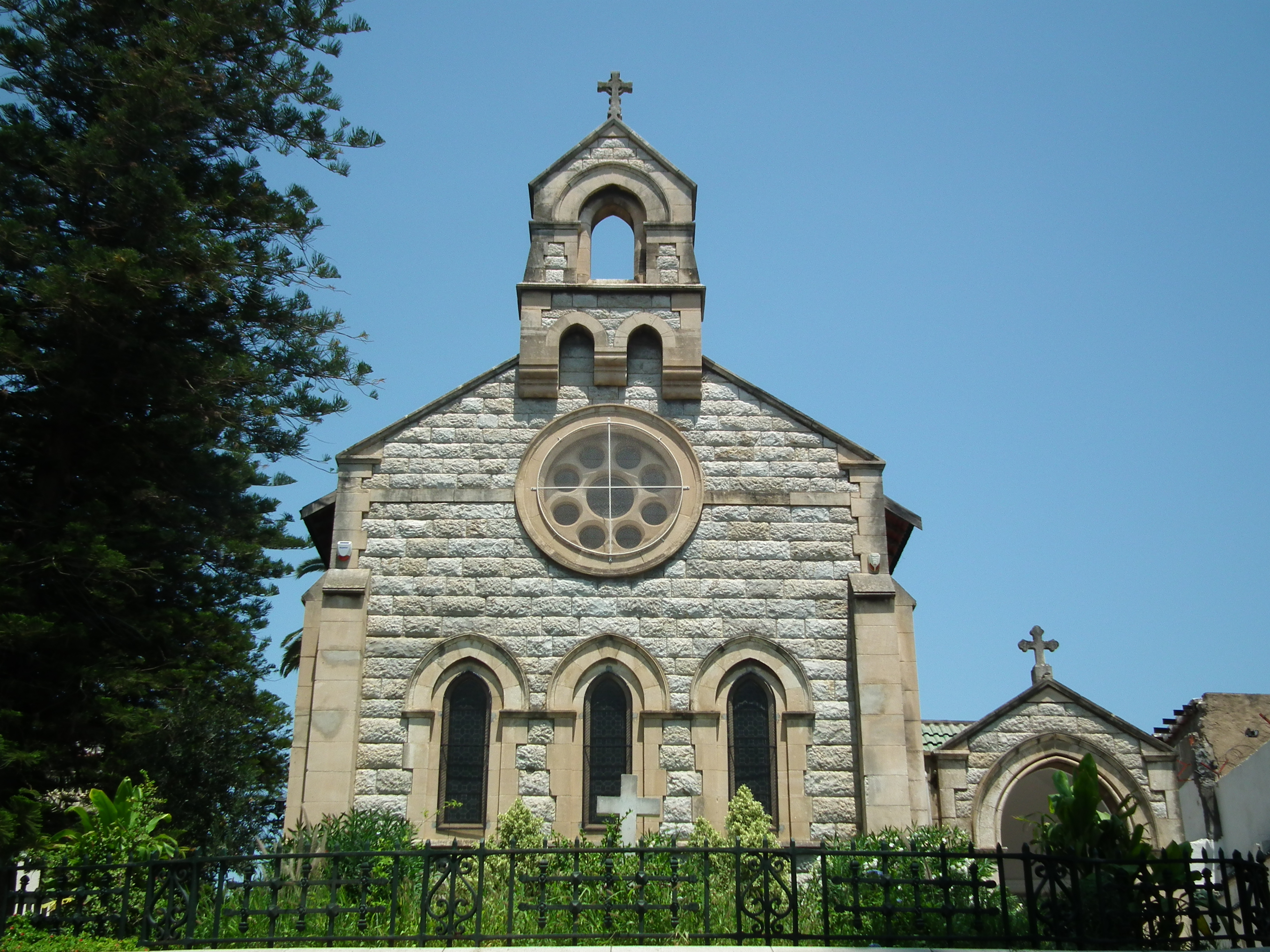
The Anglican church of Saint-Georges in Tunis

The Anglican church of Saint-Georges in Tunis was built on his order around 1696 to bury the remains of his mother Marie, of Italian origin and Protestant faith.

== Notes ==
Preceded by Mohamed Bey El Mouradi	Bey of Tunis; 1696–1699	Succeeded by Murad III Bey
