= Saida Adjoula Mosque =

Mosque in Tunis, Tunisia

Mosque
- مسجد السيدة عجولة
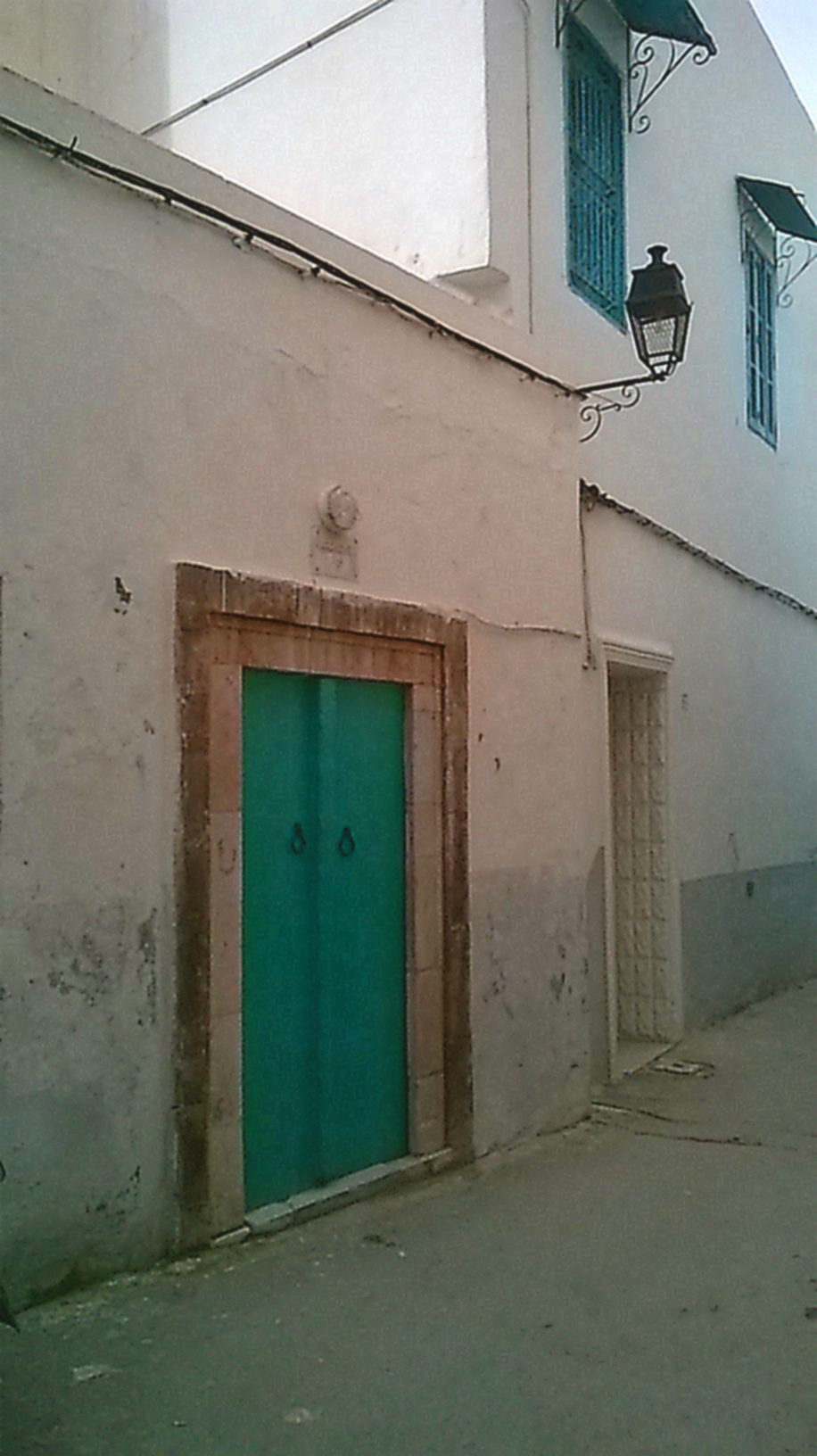

- Location within Tunisia

Religion
- Affiliation: Sunni Islam

Location
- Location: Tunis, Tunisia
- Interactive map of Mosque
- Coordinates: 36.799269°N 10.169953°E

Architecture
- Type: Mosque

Saida Adjoula Mosque is a mosque in Tunis. It is located in the north of the medina.

== Localization ==
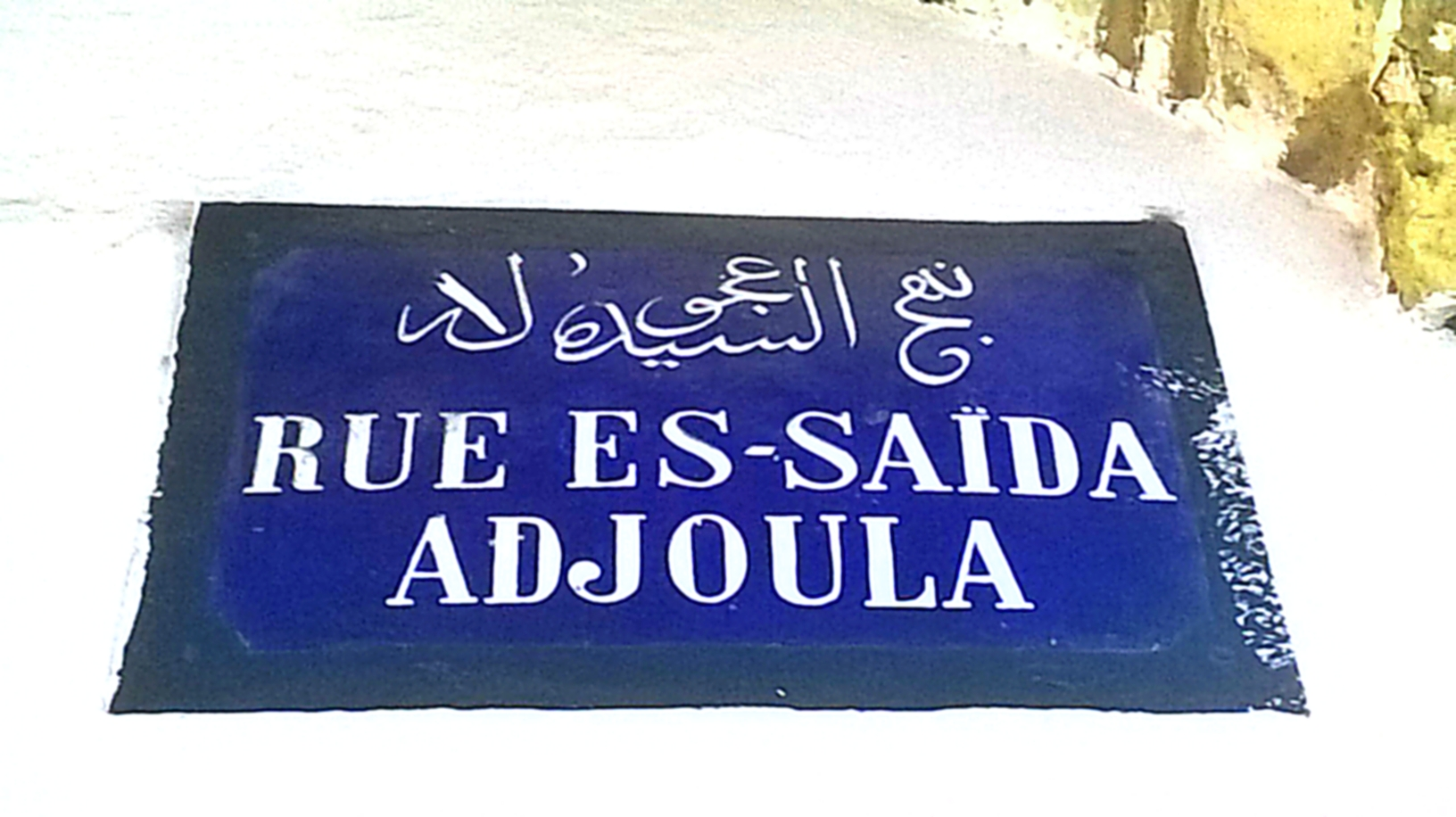
Plaque of the Saida Adjoula Street

This mosque is located at number 20, Saida Adjoula Street.

== Etymology ==
The mosque got its name from a saint, Saida Adjoula.

== History ==
The mosque was built in 1874 (1291 Hijri) under the reign of the Husainid dynasty, as mentioned by the commemorative plaque at the entrance.

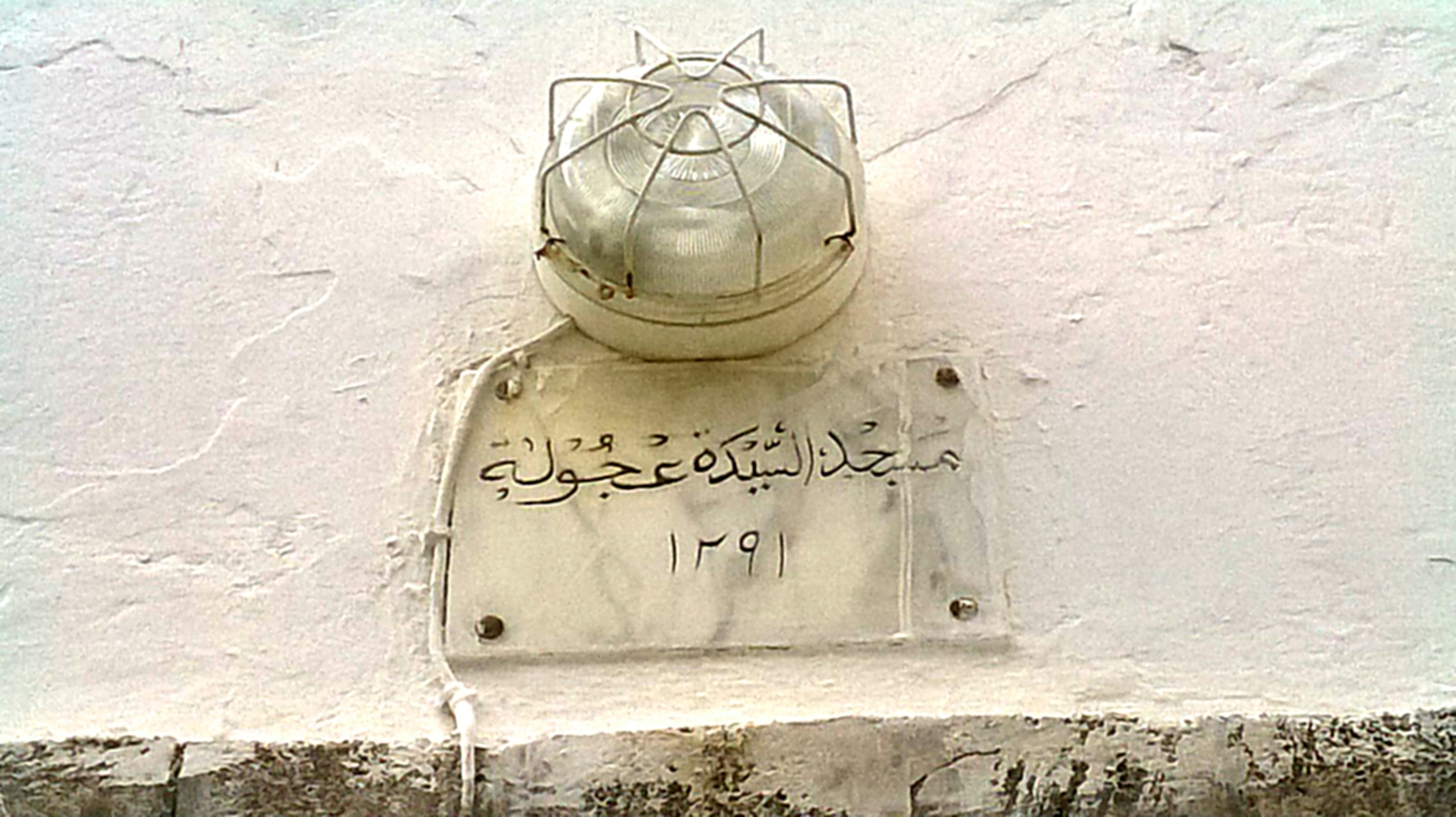
Commemorative plaque of the mosque

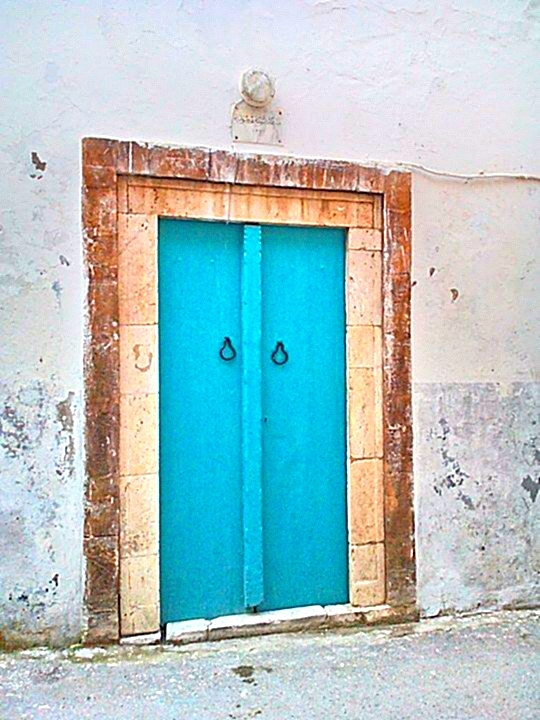
Doorway of the mosque
