= Ettarraz Mosque =

Mosque in Tunis, Tunisia

- جامع الطراز
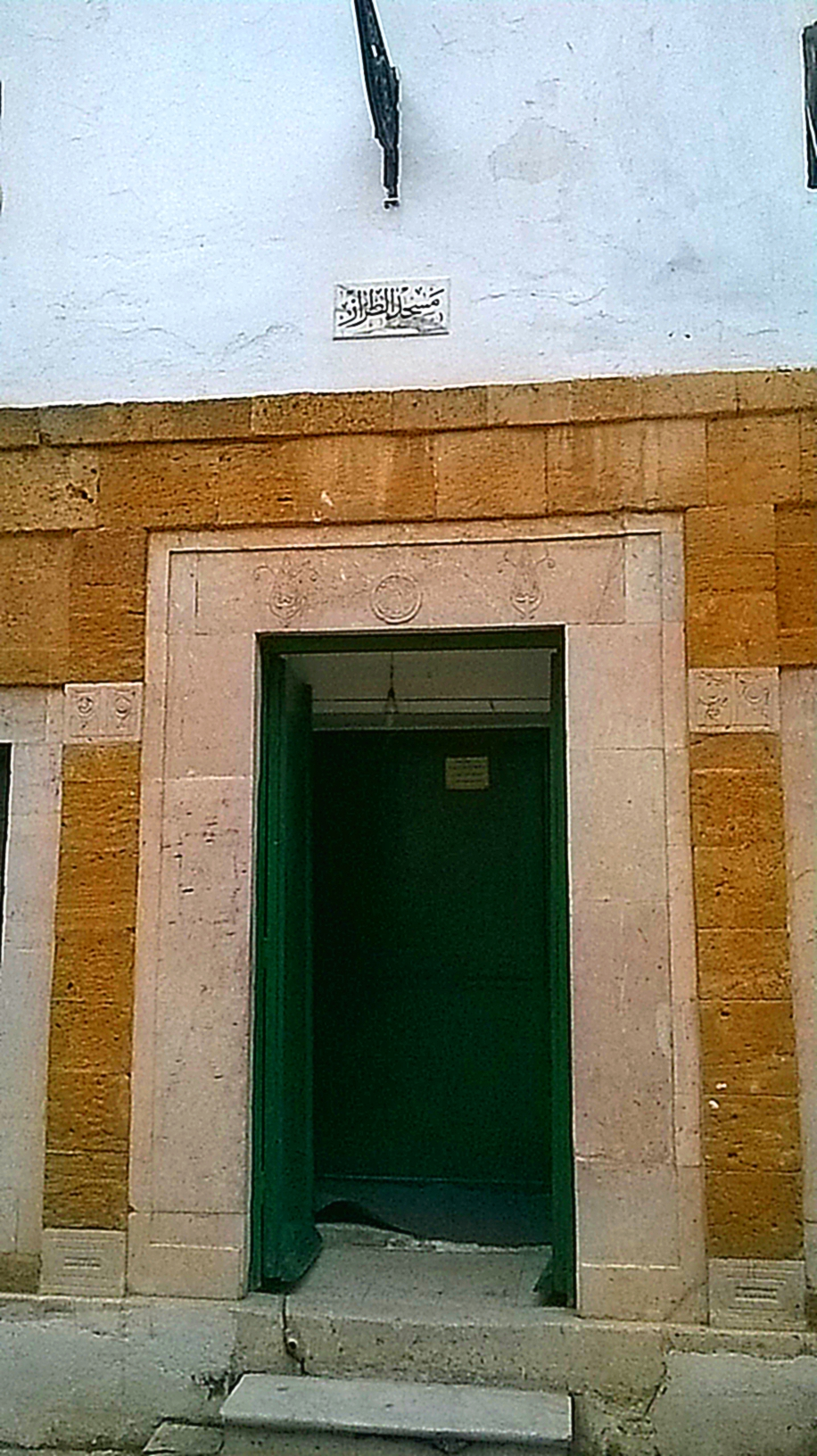

- Tunisia

Religion
- Affiliation: Islam
- Branch/tradition: Sunni

Location
- Location: Tunis, Tunisia
- Interactive map of Ettarraz Mosque
- Coordinates: 36.798876°N 10.169847°E

Architecture
- Type: Mosque
- Completed: 1836

Ettarraz Mosque (Arabic: جامع الطراز), is a Tunisian mosque located in the west of the medina of Tunis.

== Localization ==
The mosque can be found in the Sidi Ben Arous Street.

== Description ==
Ettarraz Mosque was built in 1836, during the reign of the Husainid dynasty, after an order of the emir Mustapha Ben Mahmoud Ben Mohamed El Rachid according to the plaque on the facade. It was restored in 1982.

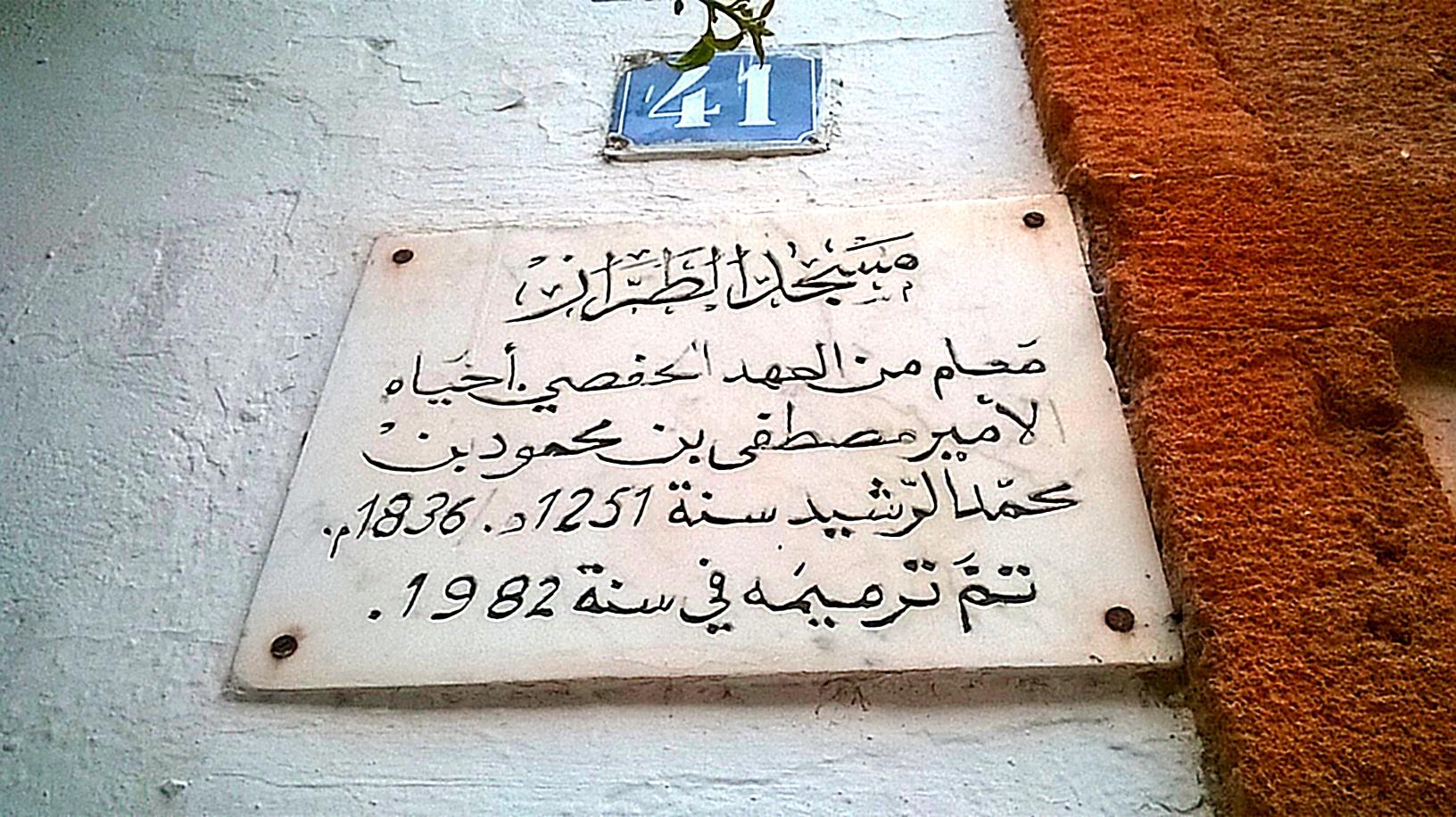
Commemorative plaque of the mosque

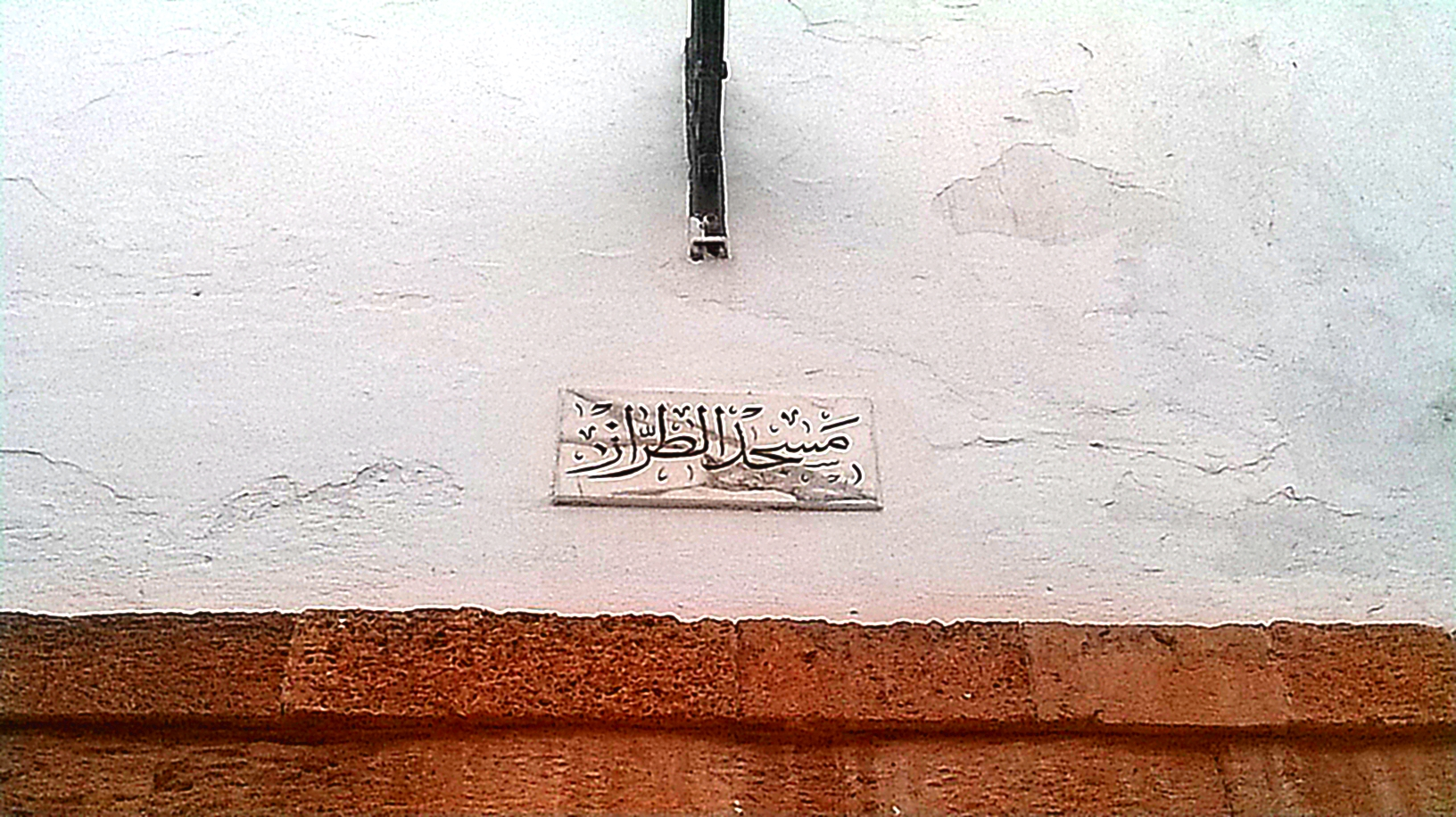
PMarbel panel with the name of the mosque

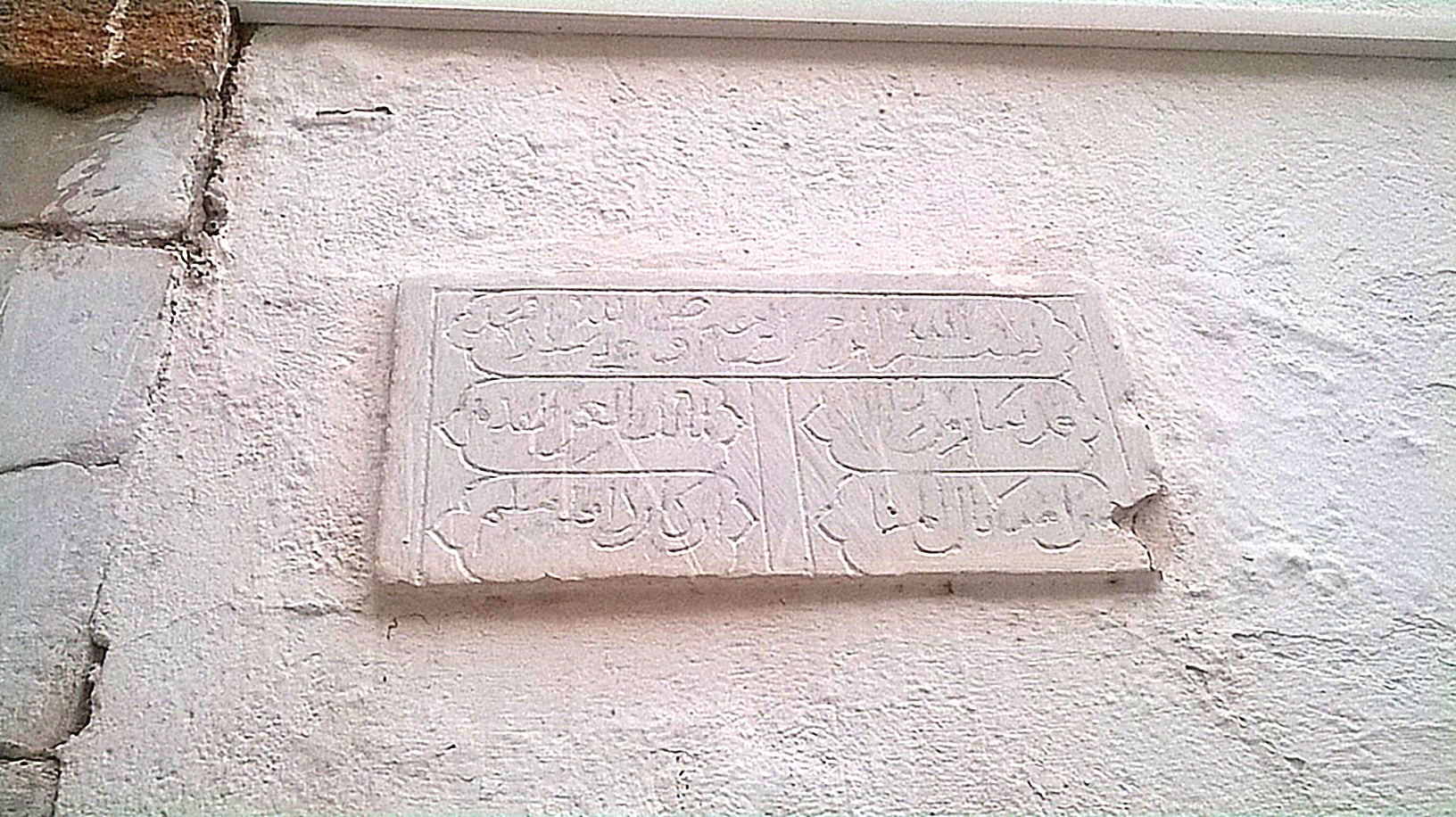
Inscription on top of the entrance of the mosque

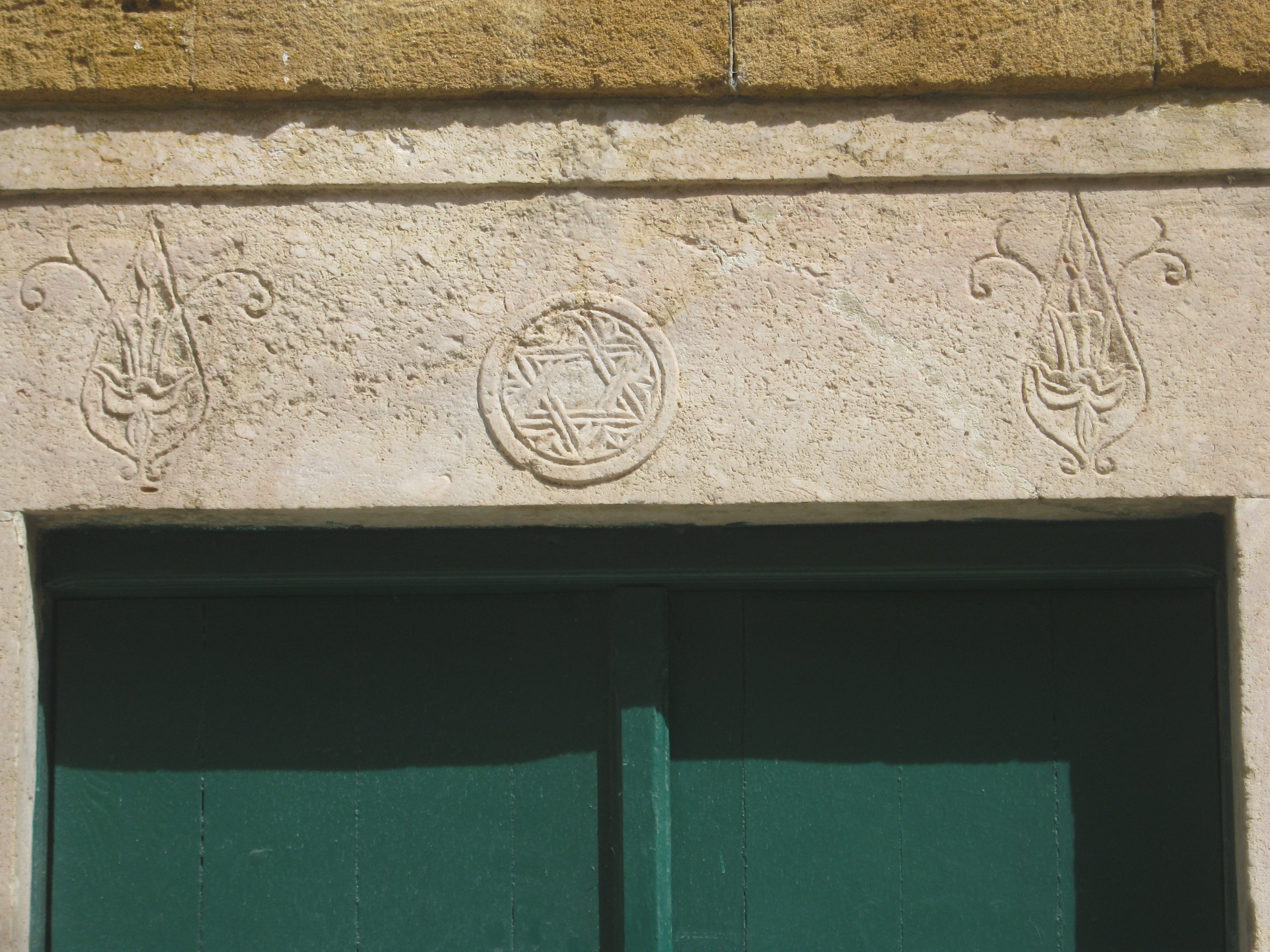
Symbols on top of the entrance
