= Abu Bakr ibn Abi Salih =

Abu Bakr ibn Abi Salih was a Persian statesman, who served as the vizier of the Ghaznavid Sultan Farrukh-Zad (r. 1052-1059) from 1055 to 1059. When the latter's son Ibrahim of Ghazna ascended the throne, Abu Bakr was appointed as chief executive of the new ruler, while Abu Sahl Khujandi was appointed vizier. Abu Bakr was killed by a group of Turkic generals and palace guards in the early 1060s.

== Sources ==
- C. E. Bosworth "Abu Bakr ibn Abi Salih." Encyclopedia Iranica. 28 January 2016. <http://www.iranicaonline.org/articles/abu-bakr-b-1>
- C. Edmund, Bosworth (1995). The Later Ghaznavids: Splendour and Decay: The Dynasty in Afghanistan and Northern India 1040-1186. ISBN 9788121505772.

| Preceded by Husayn ibn Mihran | Vizier of the Ghaznavid Empire; 1055 – 1059 | Succeeded by Abu Sahl Khujandi |
