= Murad III Bey =

Bey of Tunis
- Reign: 16 March 1699 – 9 June 1702
- Predecessor: Ramadan Bey
- Successor: Ibrahim Sharif of Tunis
- Born: 1680
- Died: June 9, 1702 (aged 21–22)

Murad III Bey (Arabic: مراد باي الثالث, 1680–9 June 1702) was the last bey of Ottoman Tunisia to rule from the Muradid dynasty from 1699 until his assassination in 1702, during the Revolutions of Tunis, a period of crisis that preceded the rise to power of Husayn I Bey.

== Biography ==
Murad was born to Ali Bey, son of Murad II Bey, and a Bedouin woman. After his father was murdered by his uncle Mohamed Bey El Mouradi, Murad was adopted by Mohamed and then later by his other uncle, Ramadan Bey. Ramadan suspected him of plotting to overthrow him and had Murad arrested and demanded that the young prince have his eyes gouged out.

Murad managed to escape before this sentence and take refuge in the mountainous region of Jebel Ousselat. He formed a group of rebels who first took Kairouan, then marched on Tunis and chased his uncle from the palace; he had him executed far from Tunis and was elected bey by the Divan on March 16, 1699.

Having come to power, he eliminated his enemies who tried to remove him from power. Because of his great cruelty, illustrated by the multiple executions he instigated, the Tunisians nicknamed him Mourad bou bala, bala being a large Turkish sabre. He was a bloodthirsty and violent sovereign; Ibn Abi Dhiaf and the chroniclers of the time relate the multiple acts of savagery committed by Mourad III such as the digging up of the remains of his uncles Mohamed and Ramadan, so that he could fire at their corpses with his musket, or the assassination of his opponents along with their whole families. The town of Kairouan, which had received him poorly during his flight, was besieged and sacked by the Makhzen tribes in 1699. On another front, he managed to pursue the Algerians on their soil and attacked Constantine in 1701, in retaliation for attacks on Tunis by the Algiers militia in 1694 . He decides to repeat his exploit and take Constantine definitively once the reinforcements arrive; Ibrahim Sherif, his lieutenant, returning from a mission to recruit janissaries in Istanbul, is charged by the Ottoman government with putting an end to his abuses.

While Ibrahim was away on a trip to Istanbul to recruit janissaries, a new war was declared between Murad III Bey and the Dey of Algiers; the Ottoman court, no longer able to control Murad, ordered Ibrahim to return to Tunisia and arrest him. On 2 June 1702, on the banks of the Wadi Zarka, Ibrahim struck Murad III with a blow from his blunderbuss, before killing him in the presence of his other lieutenants. On his return to Tunis, Sharif assassinated all the remaining princes of the Muradid dynasty in order to seize power for himself - the two young sons of Muhammad al-Hafsi al-Muradi, second son of Hammouda Pacha Bey, along with Hussein Bey, the third son of Hammouda Pacha Bey and his son who was only four years old.

Preceded by Ramadan Bey	Bey of Tunis; 1699–1702	Succeeded by Ibrahim Sharif of Tunis

== See also ==
- Bey of Tunis
- Ottoman Tunisia
- Revolutions of Tunis
