= Revolutions of Tunis =

1675–1705 period of civil wars in Ottoman Tunisia

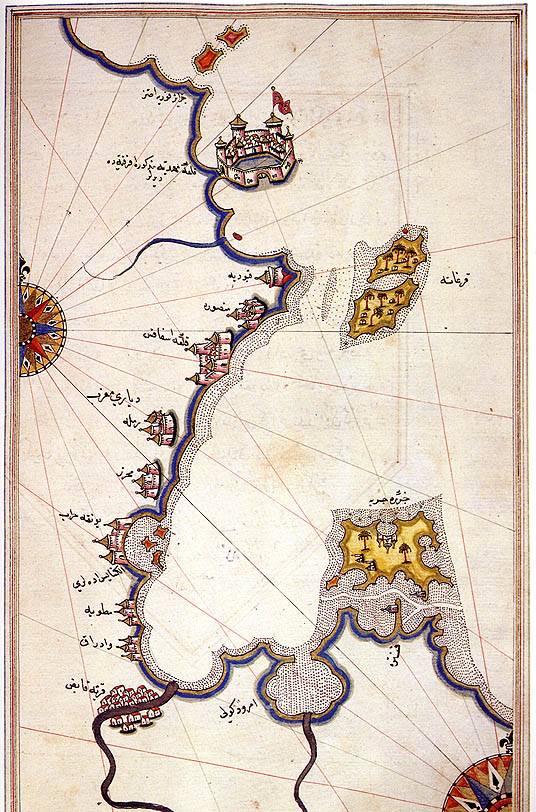
Ottoman navigation chart of the 16th century, depicting the southeastern coast of Tunisia

The Revolutions of Tunis or the Muradid War of Succession was a period of troubles and civil wars in Ottoman Tunisia. It ran from the death of the Muradid sovereign Murad II Bey in 1675 until the seizure of power by the Husainid sovereign Al-Husayn I ibn Ali at-Turki in 1705. The belligerents were Ali Bey al-Muradi and Muhammad Bey al-Muradi (sons of Murad II Bey), their uncle Muhammad al-Hafsi al-Muradi (Pasha of Tunis), several Deys of Tunis, the Turkish militia in Tunis and the Dey of Algiers.

Historians agree that the revolutions originated from the constant power conflict between the Muradid dynasty, which attempted to detach itself from Ottoman control and the Turkish militia in Tunis (headed by the divan), which challenged the primacy of the Beys and refused to submit to their increasingly monarchical rule. The Deys of Tunis found themselves in the middle of the storm, sometimes on the side of the militia if they could gain the confidence of the divan and sometimes on the side of the Muradids, who attempted more than once to place one of their proteges in charge of the divan.

== Context ==
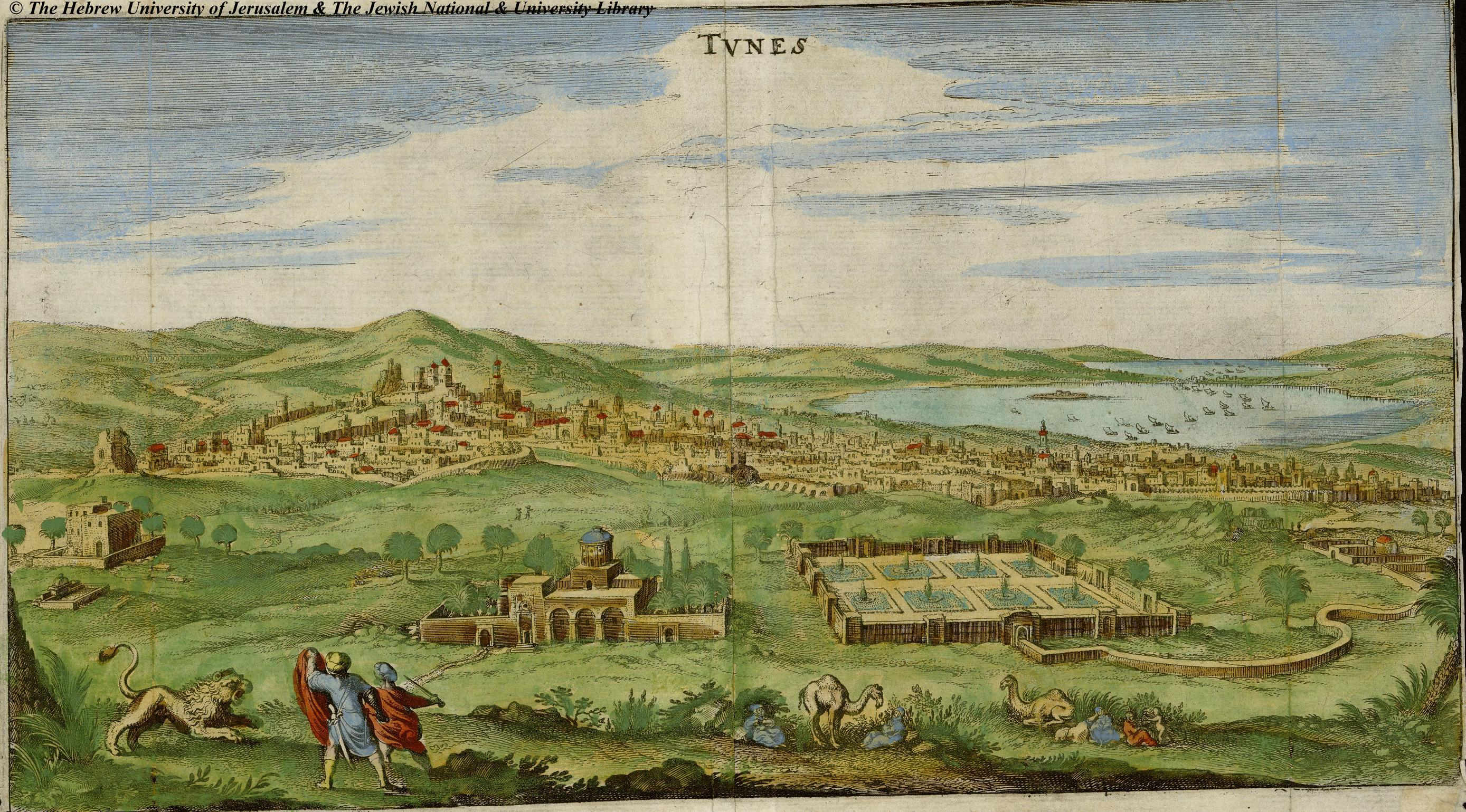
Depiction of Tunis in the middle of the 17th century, the gardens and palace of Bardo are in the foreground

Since the Ottoman conquest of 1574, the regency of Tunis had been organised so that the power of the Beys (the Muradids throughout the period in question) was counterbalanced by the divan of the Turkish militia, who elected the Dey, the de facto master of the country, since the pasha was limited to a purely honorific role. This system was undermined by Murad II Bey, son of Hammuda Pasha Bey, who had forced the Dey and the divan of the Turkish militia to recognise him as Bey before his death. Murad II seized prerogatives of the divan, such as the election of the Dey, acts avoided by his predecessors, who had respected the separation of powers established over the previous century of Ottoman rule in Tunis.

At the death of Murad II in 1675, the divan and the Dey attempted to rid themselves of a master to whom they had to submit and obey; they decided they would no longer allow what they considered to be an usurpation of power by the Muradid Beys.

== Succession to Mourad II Bey ==
The new Bey in 1675, as recognised before Murad II's death, was Muhammad Bey al-Muradi. However, a few weeks after he assumed the position, he exiled his uncle Muhammad al-Hafsi, whom the divan had acquired for their cause and elected as Dey in order to counterbalance his brother Murad II. In protocol he became the superior of his nephew, while he enjoyed the prestige that came with being the son of Hammuda Pasha Bey, who had been more popular than Murad II.

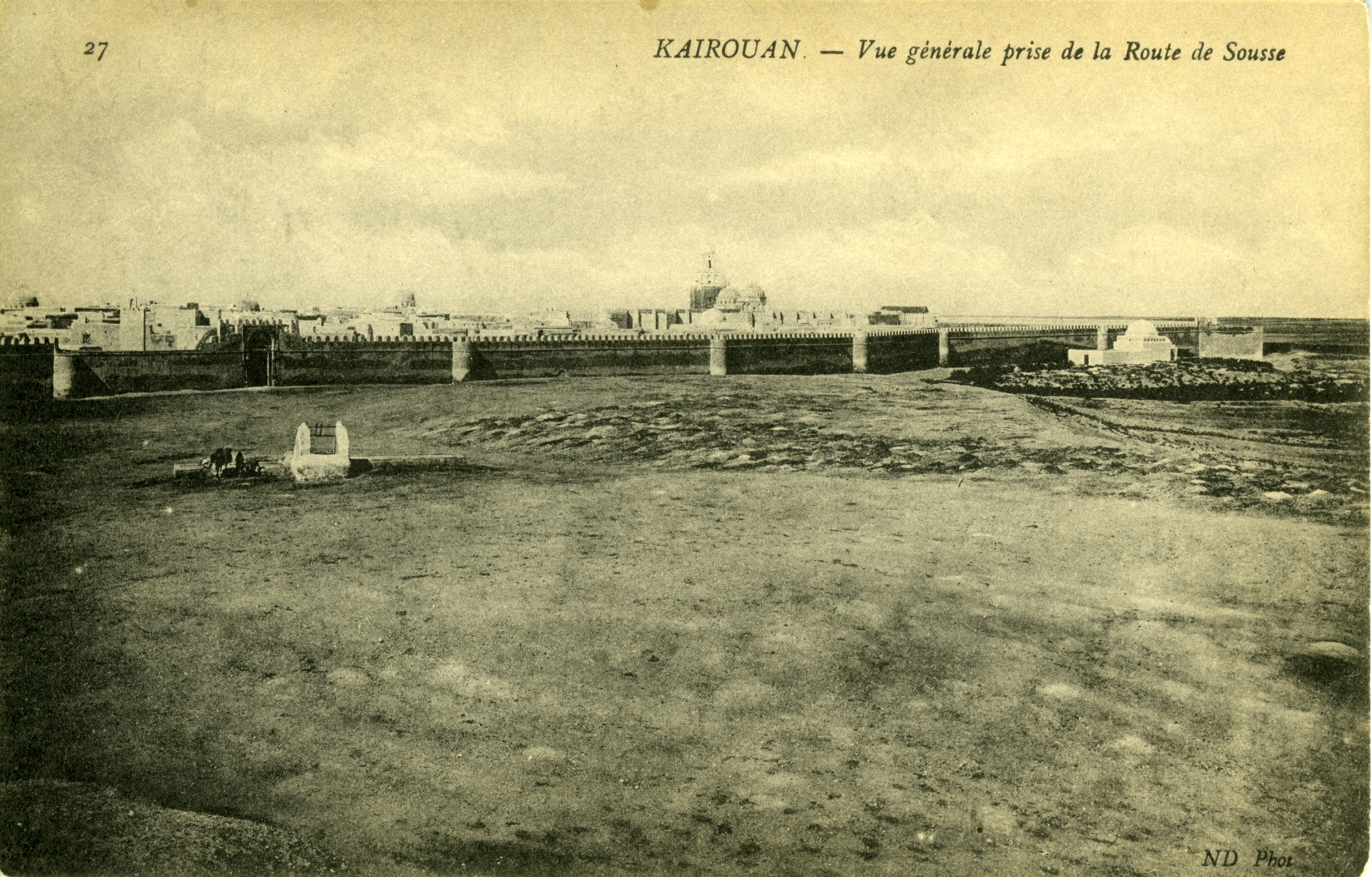
View of the Walls of Kairouan, whither Muhammad Bey al-Muradi fled in 1677

Murad II's second son, Ali Bey, disappointed by his share in the division of power had sought refuge with the Bey of Constantine; he brought the tribes of northwest Tunisia over to his side with promises of gold and silver. Muhammad Bey al-Muradi left Tunis before the troops of Ali and fled to Kairouan. Ali besieged the city but Muhammad responded to his brother's call to battle. The Battle of El Kerima, which took place on the plain of Fahs in 1677 was won by Ali. He had his troops besiege Kairouan and returned to Tunis to be recognised as Bey in place of his brother who remained under siege in Kairouan.

Muhammad al-Hafsi Pasha returned from his exile in Ottoman lands with newly recruited troops and allied with his nephew Muhammad Bey al-Muradi against Ali Bey. After mediation by the Dey of Algiers, a treaty was signed on 10 December 1679 between the three Muradid princes and the divan of the milia: Ali remained Bey of Tunis, his brother Muhammad became qaid of the sandjaks of the interior and Muhammad al-Hafsi remained Pasha of Tunis.

== Revolution of Muhammad al-Hafsi Pasha ==
The purely honorary and powerless role of pasha did not please Muhammad al-Hafsi. He secretly plotted with his nephew Muhammad to dethrone the Dey of Tunis, ally to Ali Bey. But he failed and was sent into exile to Istanbul again - this time for good. The equilibrium between them broken, the two brothers Ali and Muhammad revived their conflict and fought in the mountains in the centre of the country. At this point, the divan and militia bypassed the two brothers and elected their own Dey, Ahmed Chelebi, who was very popular among the Turks. He appointed a new Bey, his mameluke Muhammad Manyout. The two brothers, realising that they were in danger of losing power for good, made a truce and united against the Dey and his new Bey. They additionally obtained the support of the Dey of Algiers, Ahmed Khodja, who feared that the revolutionary spirit might spread to the Turkish soldiers in Algiers.

Tunis was sacked in May 1686 by the armies of the Dey of Algiers. Muhammad Bey suspected his brother of plotting with the Algerians to take power after the conquest of Tunis. He therefore had Ali assassinated and seized sole power in Tunis. Muhammad Ben Cheker, commander of the northwest tribes rallied by the Algerians, had remained in Tunis to monitor the Bey on behalf of the Dey of Algiers. Muhammad Bey al-Muradi attempted to bring Ben Cheker over to his side by offering him his daughter in marriage, but Ben Cheker desired the Beylik for himself. He could find no support in Tunis: the militia hated him because of the earlier collusion among the Muradid Beys. Ben Cheker left Tunis and rallied the forces of the Dey of Algiers whom he encouraged to seize Tunis. After a long siege which was excruciating for the populace and the flight of Muhammad Bey al-Muradi to southern Tunisia, Tunis fell into the hands of the Dey of Algiers, Chaabane Khodja, and of Ben Cheker for a second time on 12 November 1694.

== Muhammad Bey al-Muradi's return to power ==
This time, the people of Tunis were fed up with the extractions of the Turks of Algiers and the tribes of Ben Cheker who had pillaged and despoiled the markets of Tunis. Their anger was encouraged by the supporters of Muhammad Bey al-Muradi and they rose against the occupying authorities with the Turco-Tunisian militia at their head. Muhammad Bey, with the assistance of Ottoman reinforcements and some other regiments from the tribes, managed to attack Ben Cheker when he was isolated from his Algerian allies. The battle took place beneath the walls of Kairouan on 1 May 1695; the troops of Ben Cheker were cut to pieces and he fled to the Moroccan sultan Ismail Ibn Sharif. After this, Muhammad Bey al-Muradi came to Tunis during the month of Ramadan, the people opened the gates of Tunis and he entered the city amid acclamation to be recognised once more as Bey on 5 May 1695. The Dey of Tunis, abandoned by the Dey of Algiers, Chaabane Khodja, sought refuge in the citadel of the kasbah but was found and lynched by the people for the crimes committed during his rule.

Muhammad Bey al-Muradi restored peace to the rest of the country and carried out reconstruction work in Tunis, which had been damaged by the two sieges. He died in 1696 and his children were judged to be too young to rule by the divan. Romdhane, youngest son of Murad II Bey and a mediocre lieutenant to his brother Muhammad Bey was appointed Bey instead.

== Revolution of Murad III Bey ==
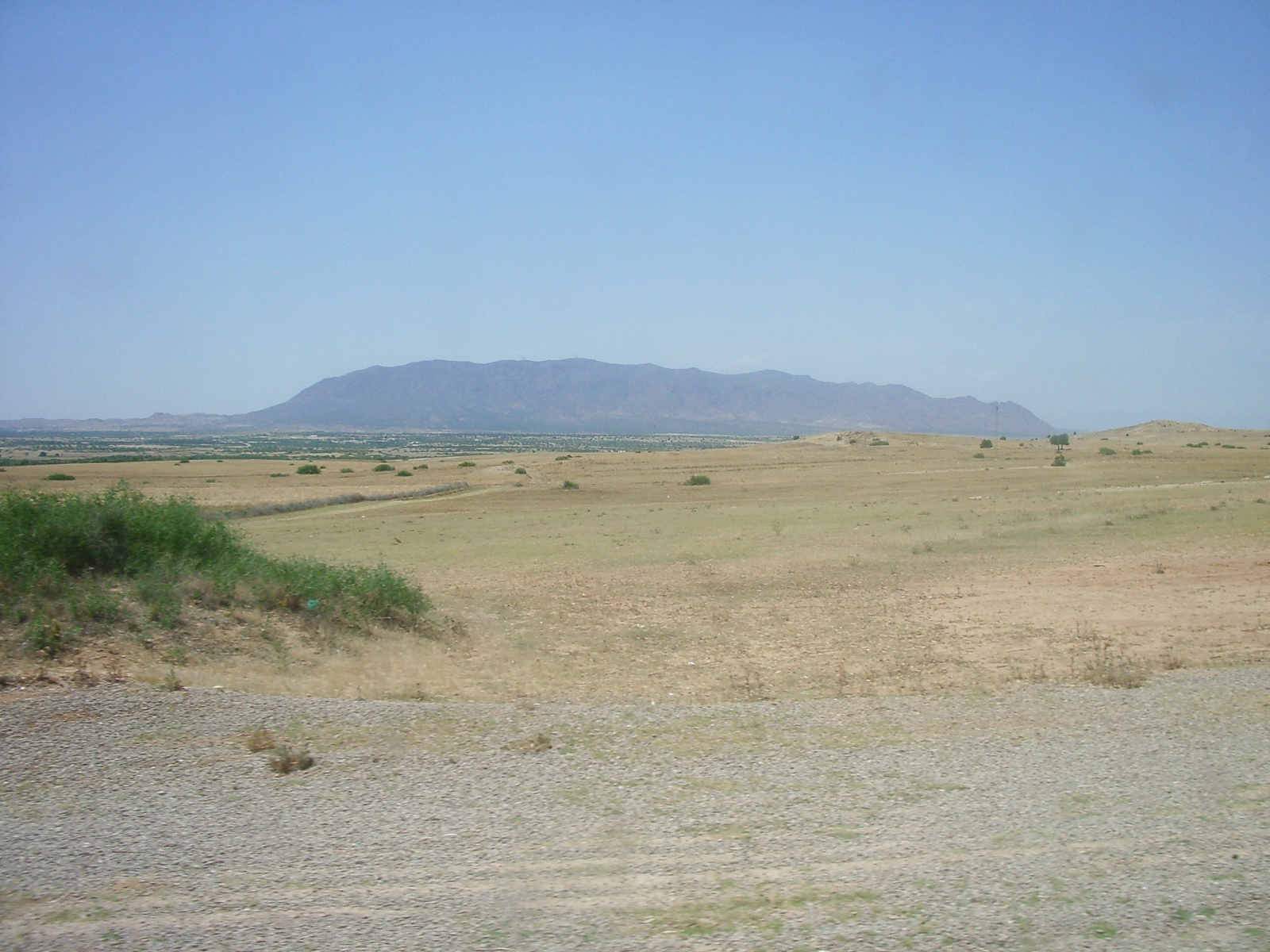
Djebel Ousselat seen from the plain of the Sahel, place of refuge of Murad III Bey

Incapable of ruling, Ramadan Bey placed the government of the beylik in the hands of Madhul, his mameluke and musician, originally from Florence. Discontent began to rise in the populace and the militia, as a result of the Florentine's mismanagement. He directed the suspicions of the Bey against his nephew Murad, who was summonsed to Dar El Bey and accused of conspiracy and sedition. Ramadan Bey condemned him to have his eyes gouged out, but Murad escaped and went to the Djebel Ousselat to raise a revolt against his uncle. The Turkish garrisons in the centre of the country and along the coast took the part of Murad, who also gathered the tribes of Arab cavalry. Ramadan Bey became fearful and attempted to flee, but was captured by his nephew's executioners and decapitated in 1699.

Murad III Bey re-entered Tunis and was proclaimed Bey at the age of eighteen. Revealing his violent and bloody side, he had all the old supporters of his uncle savagely murdered and took the opportunity to eliminate the plotters in the pay of the Dey of Algiers who attempted to use the disorder to seize control of Tunis once more. Murad III Bey gathered the divan which was keen to get revenge on the Algerians and happily declared war on Algiers. Murad III penetrated to Constantine with a strong contingent of the Tunis militia and a detachment of allies from the militia of Tripoli commanded by Khalil Bey. The Dey of Algiers, Ali Khodja, was defeated outside the walls of the city in 1698. The divan of Algiers seized power, gathered all its forces and counter-attacked, forcing Murad III Bey to abandon the siege of Constantine and return to Tunis.

== Coup d'état of Ibrahim Sharif ==
Murad III Bey revived hostilities with the Dey of Algiers and the Bey of Constantine three years later. He invited Ibrahim Sharif, agha of the janissaries of Tunis, to recruit troops in Istanbul. There Ibrahim was commanded to bring an end to hostilities between Tunis and Algiers by any means necessary. Nevertheless, ships full of Anatolian recruits arrived at Ghar El Melh and Murad III Bey led them to the Algerian border in 1702. Ibrahim Sharif plotted against him with the other lieutenants of Murad III Bey, including the agha of the sipahis (commander of cavalry), the future Husayn I Bey.

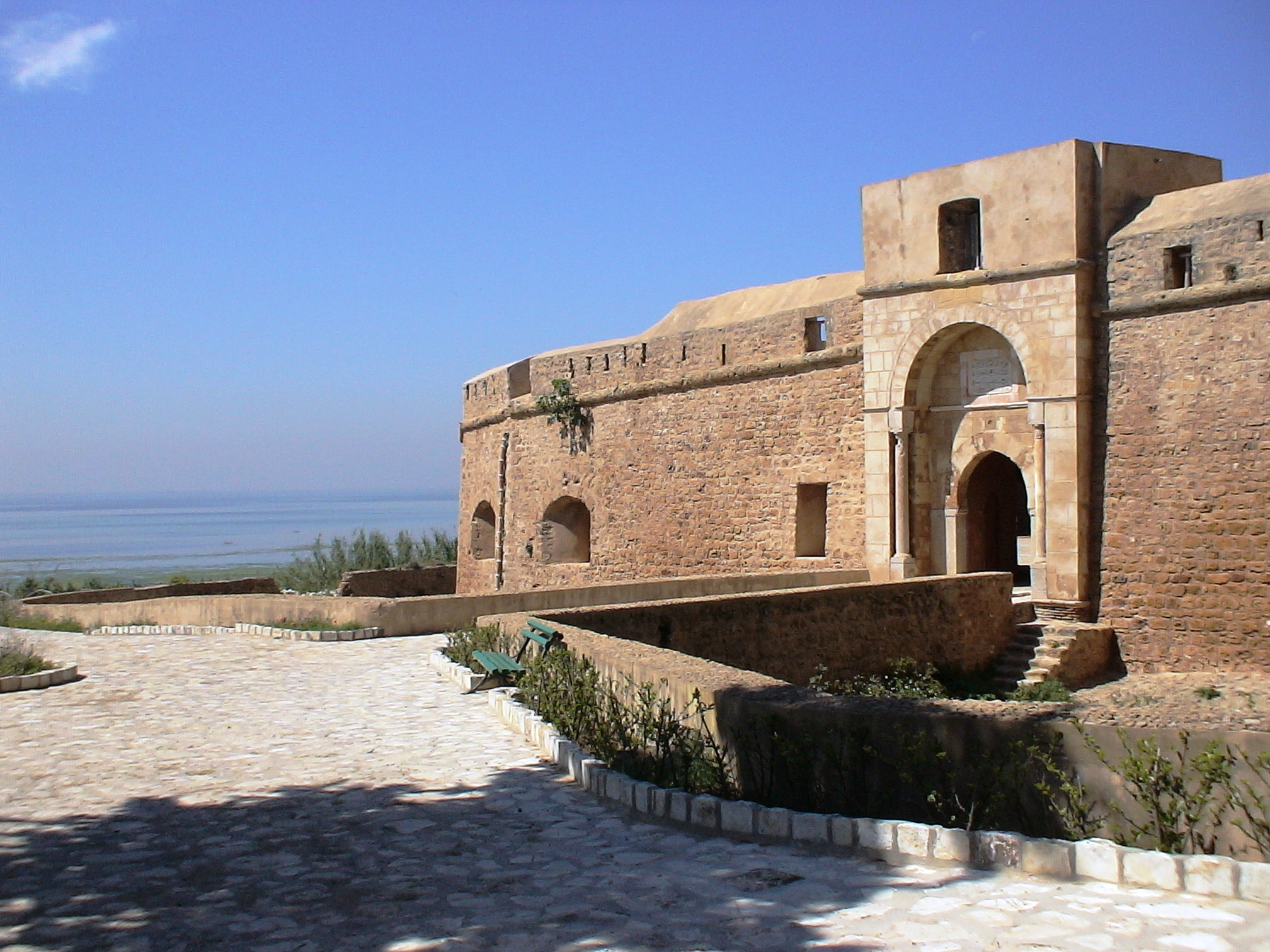
Fort of Ghar El Melh where Ibrahim Sharif was finally assassinated by the agents of Husayn I Bey

Murad III Bey was assassinated on the banks of the Wadi Zarga on 8 June 1702; Ibrahim Sharif was riding with him towards Constantine and fired his blunderbuss at the Bey who fled bleeding and was quickly surrounded by his other officers; he was held still while one of them chopped off his head with a sabre.

Ibrahim returned and assassinated all the other princes: Hassan the brother of Murad II and his cousins including a son only four years old. He returned to Tunis with the army to announce the end of the reign of the century-old Muradid rule to a shocked populace. He was named as Bey of Tunis but unable to brook any opposition, had himself elected Dey as well and announced the abolition of that title.

Ibrahim Sharif became very unpopular among the Turks on account of his massacre of the Muradid family and especially because of his accumulation of power. The weakness of his authority attracted the attention of the Dey of Algiers, who was keen for revenge . Ibrahim Sharif successfully combatted the Bey of Tripoli in the south of the country, but was defeated by the Dey of Algiers near Kef on 10 July 1705. Captured, he was taken away to Algiers. A few days later, the Agha of the Sipahis returned to Tunis with the remnants of the army of Ibrahim Sharif. This Agha, once Khaznadar (treasurer) to Murad III, was the son of the governor of Kef, Ali at-Turki.

He had himself recognised as Bey by the divan of Tunis on 15 July 1705, inaugurating a new dynasty of Beys, the Husainids, with the name Husayn I Bey.

== See also ==
Other revolts on the Barbary Coast in the same period:

Algeria

- Odjak of Algiers Revolution

Libya

- 1711 Karamanli coup
