= Murad II Bey =

- Bey of Tunis

Mohamed Bey El Mouradi
- Reign: 1666 - 1675
- Predecessor: Hammuda Pasha Bey
- Born: Ottoman Tunis

Murad II Bey (Arabic: مراد باي الثاني, died 1675) in the palace of Bardo was the third Muradid Bey of Tunis from 1666 until his death.

== Reign ==
Son of Hammuda Pasha Bey, he distinguished himself by his courage, his fortitude and his concern for the good governance of the people. He spent the greater part of his time travelling the land to levy the tribute, deal with intrusions by the army of Algiers and the collusion of the northwestern tribes with the Algerians. Furthermore, he faced a revolt of the divan of the militia, led by the Dey Ali Laz. After Murad II suffered reverses in one of his expeditions far from Tunis, Laz replaced him with Mohamed Agha, an officer of the Turkish militia. But Murad II eventually defeated the latter and was restored to power in 1673, at which point he reformed the militia. This marked the end of the Dey's power to counter the Bey.

== Building ==
Among his architectural projects is the construction of the Madrasa Mouradiyya, built on the location of an old funduq (warehouse) occupied by a portion of the Turkish militia; this madrasah was dedicated to the Maliki school of Islamic law. In addition, Murad II was also responsible for the construction of a mosque at Gabès and the creation of water works, notable a dam-bridge of the Medjerda River.

== Succession ==
Murad II married the daughter of Yusuf Dey and left three sons at his death: Mohamed Bey El Mouradi (called Mamet Bey), Ali Bey and Ramadan Bey. The first two launched a fratricidal conflict, in which their uncle Mohamed El Hafsi also took part. This conflict led to a long period of civil war called the Revolutions of Tunis, which lasted from 1675 to 1701 and ended with the assassination of all princes of the dynasty by Ibrahim Sharif of Tunis in 1701.

At his death, Murad II was buried in the mausoleum of his father located on the side of the Hammouda Pacha Mosque.

Preceded by Hammuda Pasha Bey	Bey of Tunis; 1666–1675	Succeeded by Mohamed Bey El Mouradi
