= Battle of Tlemcen (1700) =

- Part of Conflicts between the Regency of Algiers and Morocco and the Maghrebi war (1699–1702)
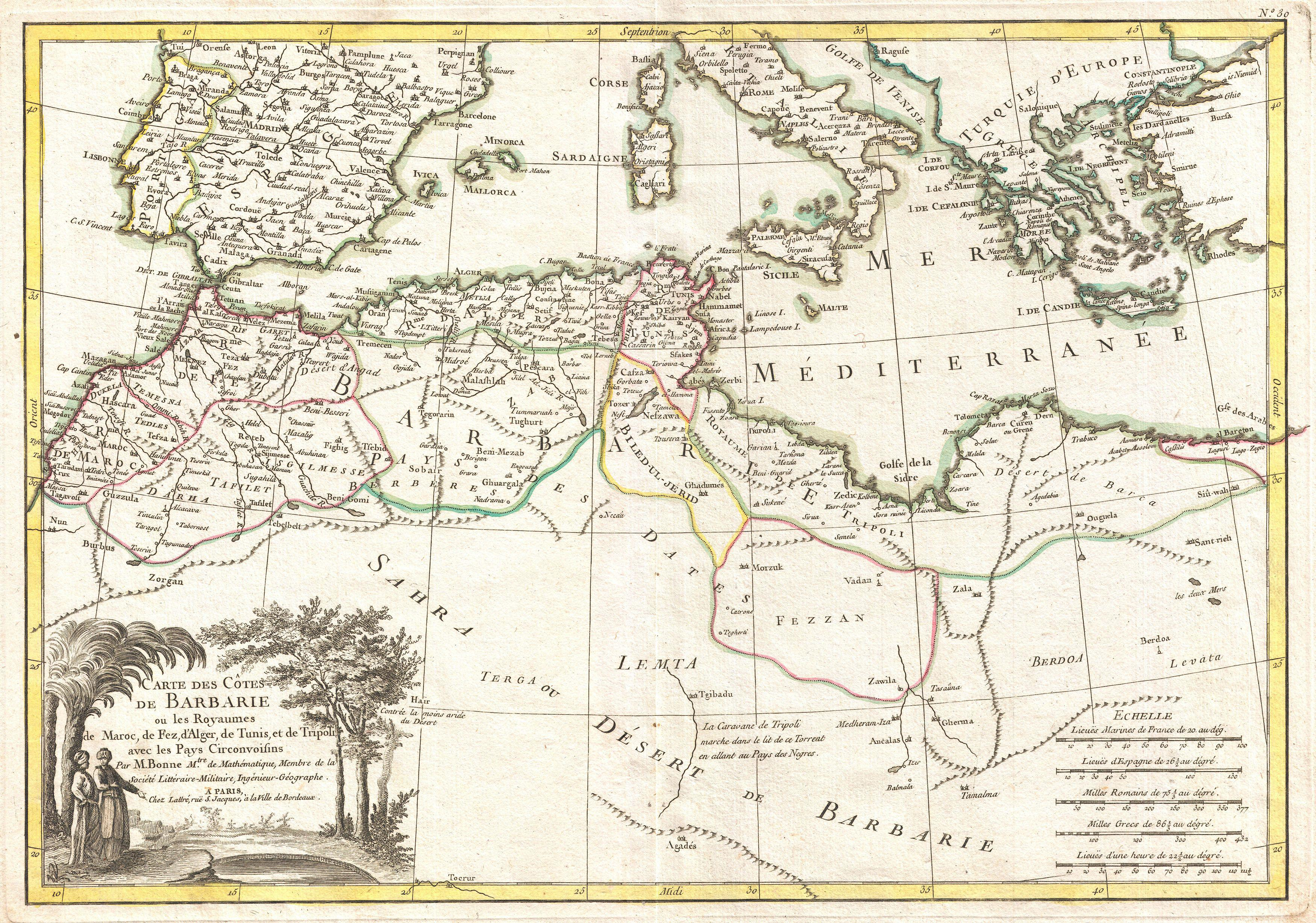
- Barbary coast view in 1771
Date	1699–1700
Location	Tlemcen
Result	Algerian victory

Belligerents
Regency of Algiers	Alawi Sultanate

Commanders and leaders
Hadj Moustapha	Ismail Ibn Sharif

Strength
12,000 men	60,000 men

The battle between the forces of Ismail Ibn Sharif, the Alawi' Sultan, and the Algerian army of the Regency of Algiers took place in 1700 near Tlemcen.

In 1699, Ismail Ibn Sharif, commanded an army of 60,000 soldiers into the territory of the Regency of Algiers, marching towards the city of Tlemcen. He was faced with an Algerian army of 12,000 men. The battle took place in 1700. Moroccan forces were defeated and suffered heavy losses.
