= Battle of Kef (1694) =

Date	June 24, 1694
Location	El Kef, Tunisia
Result	Algerian victory

Belligerents
Regency of Algiers	Beylik of Tunis

Commanders and leaders
Hadj Chabane	Mohamed Bey El Mouradi

Strength
Unknown	Unknown

Casualties and losses
Unknown	Unknown

The Battle of Kef was fought in 1694, between the Deylik of Algiers, and Muradid Tunis, during the Tunisian-Algerian War of 1694.

== Battle ==
On June 24, the same day that the Tunisian-Algerian war started, the Algerians arrived under Kef. Mohamed Bey attempting to save himself allied with the Moroccans, albeit as they had no common borders, the Moroccans could do nothing other than send him weaponry. Knowing that his weak army couldn't defeat the Algerians, he decided to offer a tribute. Hadj Chabane refused this, and attacked the Tunisians after two unsuccessful attacks carried about by Mohamed Bey. The battle ended in a catastrophic defeat for the Tunisians, who fled from the invading forces.

== Aftermath ==
Mohamed bey retreated into Tunis and planned on fortifying the town, and holding back the Algerian forces.
