= Al-Husayn I ibn Ali =

Founder of the Tunisian Husainid dynasty (1675–1740)

Hussein I Bey
- Possessor of the Kingdom of Tunis
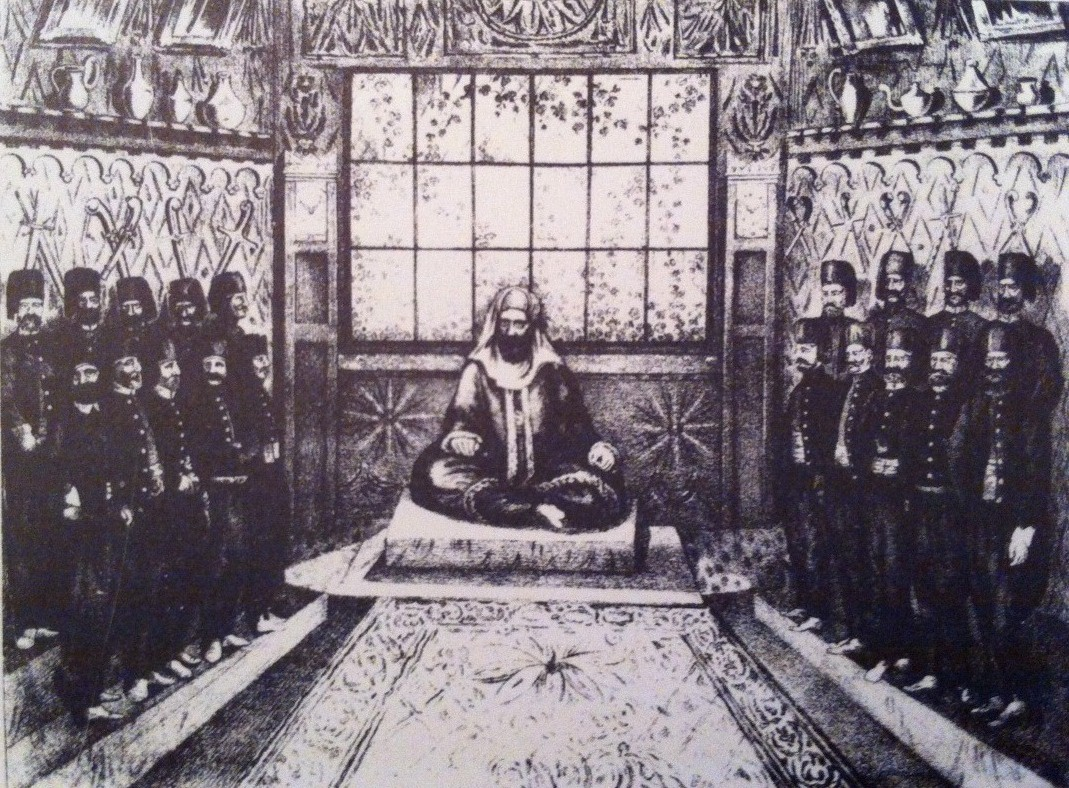

Bey of Tunis
- Reign: 12 July 1705 – 8 September 1735
- Predecessor: Ibrahim Sharif
- Successor: Ali I
- Born: Hussein Ben Ali; 1675; Le Kef, Tunisia
- Died: 13 September 1740 (aged 64–65); Kairouan, Kingdom of Tunisia
- Burial: Hussein I Mausoleum, Tunis
- Spouse: Lalla Fatma Ghazalia; Lalla Fatma Bent Osman; Lalla Jannat
- Issue: Muhammad I Rashid; Ali II; Mahmoud Bey; Moustapha Bey; Lalla Jalila Bey; Lalla Aisha Bey; Lalla Khadija; Lalla Fatima
- Hussein Ben Ali Turki
- Dynasty: Husainides
- Father: Ali Turki
- Mother: Hafsia Charnia
- Religion: Islam

Al-Husayn I ibn Ali
- Royal Family of Tunisia

Al-Husayn I ibn Ali, also known as Hussein I (Arabic: حسين الأول; born in 1675 – 13 September 1740) was the founder of the Husainid Dynasty, which ruled Tunisia until the abolition of the monarchy in 1957.

== Biography ==
Husayn was born a Kouloughli, which is a term used to refer to an Ottoman father and a local North African mother. His father was a Muslim of Cretan Greek origin and his mother was a Tunisian. The Husaynids were often called "Greeks" by Habib Bourguiba and, until recently, discussion of their origins was taboo.

In 1702 the janissary commander Ibrahim Sharif, of whom he was lieutenant, expelled the Muradid Dynasty from Tunis. Three years later, after Sharif had been captured by the Dey of Algiers, he took control of the Turkish army in Tunis and, on 12 July 1705, had himself proclaimed Bey of Tunis. He had one of his close relatives proclaimed dey by the Constantinople diwan, an act which increased his popularity amongst the Ottoman janissaries, and he was also able to gain support from his Tunisian subjects; however, his entourage was mostly composed of Mamluks. Husayn's first councillor was a Frenchman from Toulon, a literate man who had helped him in gaining power.

He imposed a unity upon the country by having Sharif assassinated at Ghar el-Melh upon his release from captivity. A pious man, Al-Husayn also used Islam to unite Tunisia's numerous different ethnicities. He built numerous edifices dedicated to religion and religious studies (madrasas), such as the Madrasahs of the Dyers (1727) and al-Husseyniah in Tunis, as well as the mosque of Le Bardo and other madrasas in the country's mainland (Kairouan, Sfax, Sousse and Nafta).

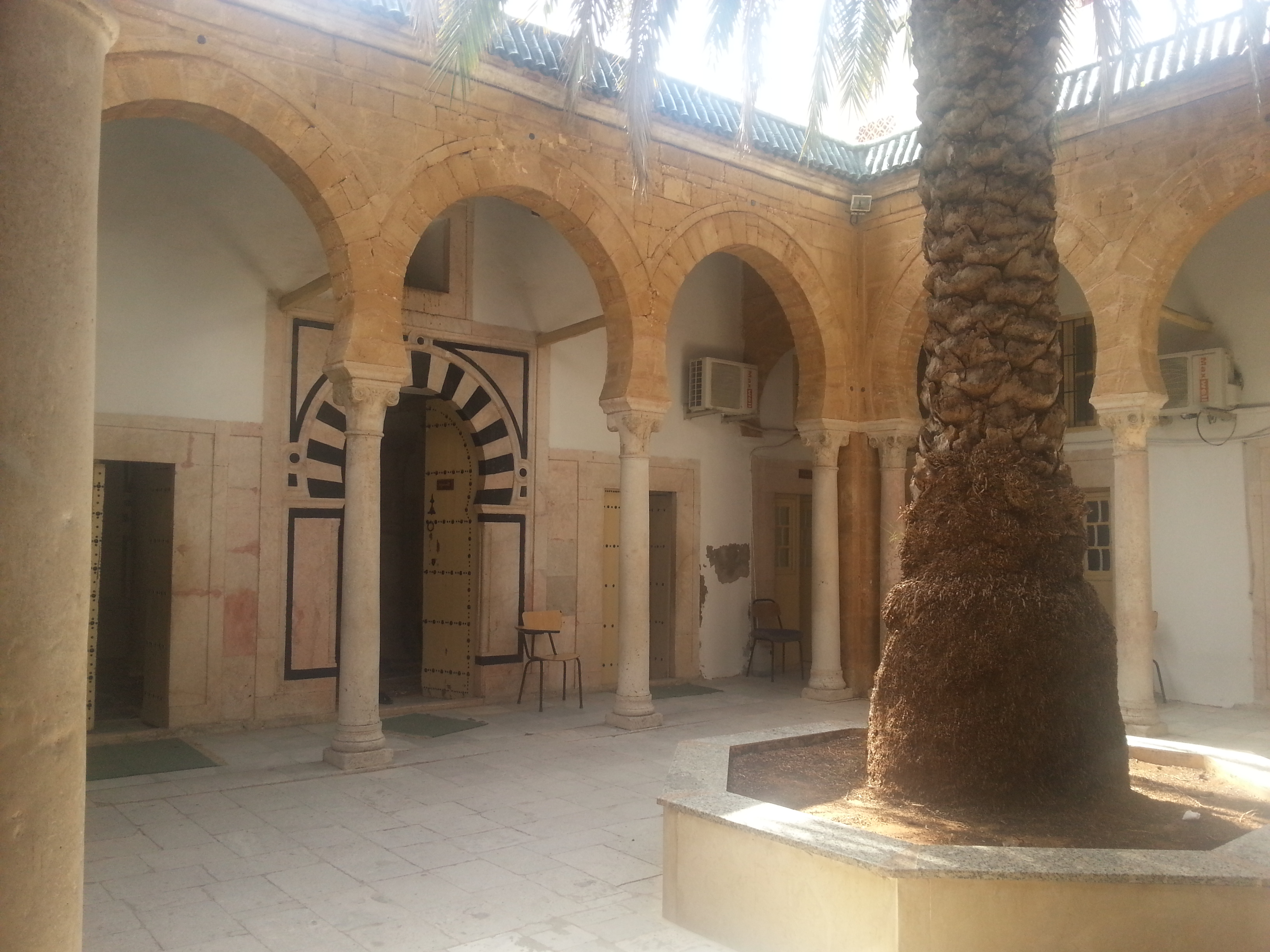
Madrasa Ennakhla

In 1726 he ordered the construction of El Jedid Mosque in Tunis.

Husayn tried to establish a succession to the title of bey for his sons Muhammad and Ali (born in 1710 and 1712, respectively). His nephew Ali Pasha, who had been plotting against him and had been therefore put under surveillance by Husayn, was able to escape and revolted, with the help of local tribes and of the Dey of Algiers. The latter invaded Tunisia and defeated Husayn at the battle of Smindja on 4 September 1735. Husayn was forced to flee to Sousse, while his troops in Tunis capitulated. Husayn was captured and beheaded on 13 September 1740.

== Bibliography ==
- Brett, Michael; Fentress, Elizabeth (1997), The Berbers, Wiley-Blackwell, ISBN 0631207678.

Regnal titles
Preceded by Ibrahim Sharif (bey of Tunis)	Bey of Tunis; 1705–1735	Succeeded by 'Abu'l Hasan 'Ali I
