= List of beys of Tunis =

Royal chieftans, 1613–1956

Bey of Tunis (1613–1956) King of Tunisia (1956–1957)
- Flag of the Bey of Tunis (Husainid dynasty)

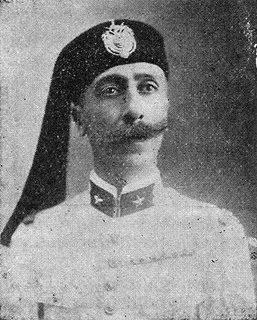
- Last to reign: Muhammad VIII; 15 May 1943 – 25 July 1957

Details
- Style: His Majesty
- First monarch: Murad I Bey
- Last monarch: Muhammad VIII
- Formed: 1613
- Abolished: 25 July 1957 (Abolition of monarchy)

This is a list of the beys of Tunis who ruled Tunisia from 1613, when the Corsican-origin Muradid dynasty came to power, until 1957, when the Cretan-origin Husainid monarchy was abolished.

== Muradid dynasty (1613–1702) ==
Coat of arms of the Muradid dynasty

Name	Lifespan	Reign start	Reign end	Notes	Family	Image
Murad I Bey: مراد الأول	? – 1631	1613	1631		Muradid	
Hammuda Pasha Bey: حمودة باشا باي	? – 13 April 1666	1631	1666	Son of Murad I Bey	Muradid	
Murad II Bey: مراد باي الثاني	? – 1675	1666	1675 (murdered)	Son of Hammuda Pasha Bey	Muradid	
Mohamed Bey El Mouradi: محمد باي المرادي	? – 14 October 1696	1675	14 October 1696	Son of Murad II Bey	Muradid	
Ramadan Bey: رمضان باي المرادي	? – 16 March 1699	14 October 1696	16 March 1699	Son of Murad II Bey	Muradid	
Murad III Bey: مراد باي الثالث	1680 – 9 June 1702	16 March 1699	9 June 1702	Grandson of Murad II Bey	Muradid	

== Revolutions of Tunis (1702–1705) ==
Name	Lifespan	Reign start	Reign end	Notes	Family	Image
Ibrahim Sharif: إبراهيم الشريف	1640 – 1705	9 June 1702	15 July 1705			

== Husainid dynasty (1705–1957) ==
Coat of arms of the Husainid dynasty

=== Beys of Tunis (1705–1956) ===
Name	Lifespan	Reign start	Reign end	Notes	Family	Image
Al-Husayn I ibn Ali: الحسين الأول بن علي التركي	1669 – 13 March 1740 (aged 71)	15 July 1705	7 September 1735 (deposed)	The founder of the Husainid dynasty	Husainid	
Abu l-Hasan Ali I: أبو الحسن علي الأول	30 June 1688 – 22 September 1756 (aged 68)	7 September 1735	22 September 1756	Nephew of Al-Husayn I ibn Ali	Husainid	
Muhammad I ar-Rashid: محمد الأول الرشيد	1710 – 12 February 1759 (aged 49)	22 September 1756	12 February 1759	Son of Al-Husayn I ibn Ali	Husainid	
Ali II ibn Hussein: علي الثاني بن حسين	24 November 1712 – 26 May 1782 (aged 69)	12 February 1759	26 May 1782	Son of Al-Husayn I ibn Ali	Husainid	
Hammuda ibn Ali: حمودة بن علي	9 December 1759 – 15 September 1814 (aged 54)	26 May 1782	15 September 1814	Son of Ali II ibn Hussein	Husainid	
Uthman ibn Ali: عثمان بن علي	27 May 1763 – 20 December 1814 (aged 51)	15 September 1814	20 December 1814 (murdered)	Son of Ali II ibn Hussein	Husainid	
Mahmud ibn Muhammad: محمود بن محمد	10 July 1757 – 28 March 1824 (aged 66)	20 December 1814	28 March 1824	Son of Muhammad I ar-Rashid	Husainid	
Al-Husayn II ibn Mahmud: الحسين الثاني بن محمود	5 March 1784 – 20 May 1835 (aged 51)	28 March 1824	20 May 1835	Son of Mahmud ibn Muhammad	Husainid	
Mustafa ibn Mahmud: مصطفى بن محمود	1786 – 10 October 1837 (aged 51)	20 May 1835	10 October 1837	Son of Mahmud ibn Muhammad	Husainid	
Ahmad I ibn Mustafa: Ahmad Bey; أحمد الأول بن مصطفى	2 December 1806 – 30 May 1855 (aged 48)	10 October 1837	30 May 1855	Son of Mustafa ibn Mahmud	Husainid	Ahmad I ibn Mustafa of Tunis
Muhammad II ibn al-Husayn: M'hamed Bey; محمد الثاني بن الحسين	18 September 1811 – 22 September 1859 (aged 48)	30 May 1855	22 September 1859	Son of Al-Husayn II ibn Mahmud	Husainid	Muhammad II ibn al-Husayn of Tunis
Muhammad III as-Sadiq: Sadok Bey; محمد الثالث الصادق	7 February 1813 – 27 October 1882 (aged 69)	22 September 1859	27 October 1882	Son of Al-Husayn II ibn Mahmud	Husainid	Muhammad III as-Sadiq of Tunis
Ali III ibn al-Husayn: Ali Bey; علي الثالث بن الحسين	14 August 1817 – 11 June 1902 (aged 84)	28 October 1882	11 June 1902	Son of Al-Husayn II ibn Mahmud	Husainid	Ali III ibn al-Husayn of Tunis
Muhammad IV al-Hadi: Hédi Bey; محمد الرابع الهادي	24 June 1855 – 11 May 1906 (aged 50)	11 June 1902	11 May 1906	Son of Ali III ibn al-Husayn	Husainid	Muhammad IV al-Hadi of Tunis
Muhammad V an-Nasir: Naceur Bey; محمد الخامس الناصر	14 July 1855 – 10 July 1922 (aged 66)	11 May 1906	10 July 1922	Son of Muhammad II ibn al-Husayn	Husainid	Muhammad V an-Nasir of Tunis
Muhammad VI al-Habib: Habib Bey; محمد السادس الحبيب	13 August 1858 – 11 February 1929 (aged 70)	10 July 1922	11 February 1929	Cousin of Muhammad V an-Nasir	Husainid	Muhammad VI al-Habib of Tunis
Ahmad II ibn Ali: Ahmed Bey; أحمد الثاني بن علي	13 April 1862 – 19 June 1942 (aged 80)	11 February 1929	19 June 1942	Son of Ali III ibn al-Husayn	Husainid	Ahmad II ibn Ali of Tunis
Muhammad VII al-Munsif: Moncef Bey; محمد السابع المنصف	4 March 1881 – 1 September 1948 (aged 67)	19 June 1942	15 May 1943 (deposed)	Son of Muhammad V an-Nasir	Husainid	Muhammad VII al-Munsif of Tunis
Muhammad VIII al-Amin: Lamine Bey; محمد الثامن الأمين	4 September 1881 – 30 September 1962 (aged 81)	15 May 1943	20 March 1956 (proclaimed King of Tunisia)	Son of Muhammad VI al-Habib	Husainid	Muhammad VIII al-Amin of Tunis

=== King of Tunisia (1956–1957) ===
Name	Lifespan	Reign start	Reign end	Notes	Family	Image
Muhammad VIII al-Amin: Lamine Bey; محمد الثامن الأمين	4 September 1881 – 30 September 1962 (aged 81)	20 March 1956	25 July 1957 (deposed)	Son of Muhammad VI al-Habib	Husainid	Muhammad VIII al-Amin of Tunis

== Genealogical tree ==
Simplified genealogical tree of the Beys of Tunis. Only the Beys and their direct ancestors are shown.

Ali at-Turki
Muhammad	Husayn I r. 1705–1735
Ali I r. 1735–1756	Muhammad I ar-Rashid r. 1756–1759	Ali II r. 1759–1782
Hammuda r. 1782–1814	Uthman r. 1814
Mahmud r. 1814–1824
Husayn II r. 1824–1835	Mustafa r. 1835–1837
Ahmad I r. 1837–1855
Muhammad II r. 1855–1859	Muhammad III as-Sadiq r. 1859–1882	Ali III r. 1882–1902	Muhammad al-Ma'mun
Muhammad IV al-Hadi r. 1902–1906
Muhammad V an-Nasir r. 1906–1922	Muhammad VI al-Habib r. 1922–1929
Ahmad II r. 1929–1942
Muhammad VII al-Munsif r. 1942–1943	Muhammad VIII al-Amin r. 1943–1957

== See also ==
- List of French residents-general in Tunisia
- President of Tunisia
  - List of presidents of Tunisia
  - First Lady of Tunisia
- Prime Minister of Tunisia
  - List of prime ministers of Tunisia
- Lists of office-holders
- List of current heads of state and government
