= Ibrahim Sharif of Tunis =

Ibrahim Sharif

Bey of Tunis
- Reign: 9 June 1702 - 12 July 1705
- Predecessor: Murad III Bey
- Successor: Al-Husayn I ibn Ali
- Born: 1640; Tunis, Tunisia
- Died: 1705 (aged 64–65); Ghar el-Melh, Tunisia

Ibrahim Sharif (Arabic: إبراهيم الشريف) was Bey of Tunis from 1702 to 1705, during the revolutions of Tunis, a period of crisis which brought an end to the Muradid dynasty and preceded the rise to power of Husayn I Bey.

Lieutenant of the Muradid Beys of Tunis, Ibrahim was at various points Agha of the sipahis (commander of the cavalry of the Turkish militia) and Agha of the janissaries (commander of the rifleman) to the final Muradid princes.

During a trip to Istanbul to recruit janissaries, a new war was declared between Murad III Bey and the Dey of Algiers; the Ottoman court, no longer able to control Murad III, ordered Ibrahim to return to Tunisia and arrest him. At the outset of the military campaign, on the banks of the Wadi Zarka, Ibrahim struck Murad III with a blow from his blunderbuss, before killing him in the presence of his other lieutenants. On his return to Tunis Sharif assassinated all the remaining princes of the Muradid dynasty in order to seize power for himself - the two young sons of Muhammad al-Hafsi al-Muradi, second son of Hammouda Pacha Bey, along with Hussein Bey, the third son of Hammouda Pacha Bey and his own son who was only four years old.

Proclaimed Bey by the janissary militia, he was the first Bey not to be a Muradid in over a century. He was also designated Pasha by the Ottomans, as a reward for bringing an end to hostilities and subsequently was elected Dey of Tunis by the Ottoman divan of Tunis. He promptly abolished the title and powers of the Dey.

Although he had accumulated all the offices at the head of the Tunisian beylik, he did not manage to put an end to the revolts and agitation begun after the death of the last Muradids. After he was defeated by the Dey of Algiers near Kef on 8 July 1705, he was captured and taken to Algiers, which led to the establishment of the Husainid dynasty after his own Agha of the Sipahis, Al-Husayn I ibn Ali at-Turki seized power. On his return to Tunis on 10 July, he was proclaimed Bey of Tunis.

Ibrahim, freed by the Dey of Algiers, attempted to retake Tunis in order to avenge himself and regain power, but he was assassinated on the way at the order of Husayn I Bey at Ghar el-Melh. His tomb is located at the foot of the city's fort.

== See also ==
- Bey of Tunis
- Ottoman Tunisia
- Revolutions of Tunis
