= Mohamed Bey El Mouradi =

Mohamed Bey El Mouradi محمد باي المرادي
- Bey of Tunis
- Muradid coat of arms
- Reign: 1675 - 14 October 1696
- Predecessor: Murad II Bey
- Successor: Ramadan Bey
- Born: Ottoman Tunisia
- Died: 14 October 1696

Mohamed Bey El Mouradi (Arabic: محمد باي المرادي, died October 14, 1696) was a Muradid leader and Bey of Tunis from 1675 until his death in 1696. He was the eldest son of Murad II Bey.

Mohamed Bey's reign was plagued with upheaval and civil war worsened by constant raiding from neighboring Algiers. His uncle, Pasha Mohammed Al-Hafsi and brother Ali bin Murad would attempt several times to usurp the throne. Al-Hafsi was exiled in 1679 but Ali bin Murad, disappointed by his share in the division of power sought refuge in the Beylik of Constantine, a governorate of the Regency of Algiers. He brought the tribes of northwest Tunisia led by Muhammad ben Cheker over to his side with promises of gold and silver.

He besieged Tunis, while Muhammad Bey al-Muradi fled from Tunis to Kairouan before the troops of his brother arrived. Ali besieged the city but Muhammad broke out of the siege, and met Ali on the field of battle. The Battle of El Kerima, which took place on the plain of Fahs in 1677 was decisively won by Ali. He had his troops besiege Kairouan and returned to Tunis to be recognised as Bey in place of his brother who remained under siege in Kairouan.

After some mediation by the Dey of Algiers, a treaty was signed in 1679 between the Muradid princes, but this peace didn't last long. The Turkish janissaries of Tunis elected their own leader, Ahmed Chelebi who attempted to take over the country. He was defeated by the Algerians who feared that the revolutionary spirit of the janissaries in Tunis would spread to their own country. They sacked Tunis in 1686, and left the country in ruins. Mohamed Bey suspected his brother Ali of supporting the Algerians, and thus killed him and seized power for himself.

In 1694 Dey Hadj Chabane invaded Tunisia with the help of a pretender called Mohammed ben Cheker. The resulting war ended in the total annexation of Tunis for several months. During that time Chaabane appointed ben Cheker as the Bey of Tunis, a new Beylik of Algiers similarly functioning in the same way as the Beylik of Constantine.

This didn't last long though, and in 1695 the Tunisians revolted and defeated ben Cheker at the battle of Kairouan, reinstating the Muradid dynasty.

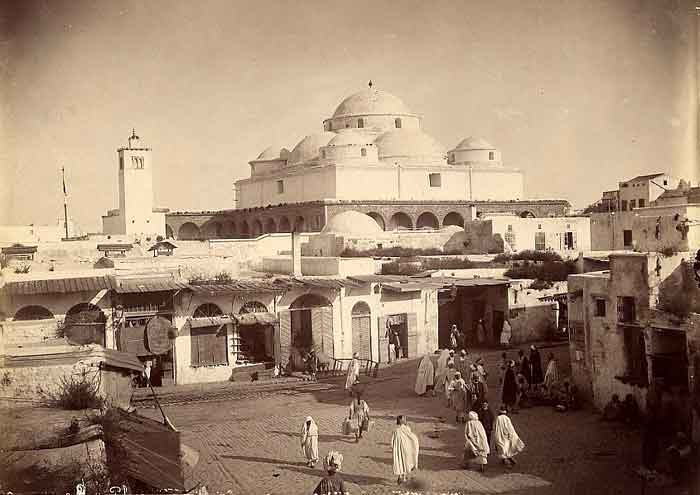
Sidi Mahrez Mosque

Despite the troubled times, he was responsible for building several monuments in Tunis including the Sidi Mahrez Mosque, modelled on the mosques of Istanbul with a great central dome, In addition the construction of many buildings of worship and education within the country he ordered construction works in Beja, El Kef, Gafsa, Tozeur and Gabès. In 1690 Mohamed Bey built a bridge between Tebourba and Medjerda.

He died on October 14, 1696, and was buried in the mausoleum of his grandfather Hammuda Pasha Bey. He was survived by two sons, Mourad and Hassan, but as they were too young to reign his brother, Ramadan Bey, inherited his estate.

== Notes ==
Preceded by Murad II Bey	Bey of Tunis; 1675–1696	Succeeded by Ramadan Bey
