= Muradid dynasty =

Dynasty that ruled Tunisia

- Country: Ottoman Tunisia
- Founded: 1613
- Founder: Murad I
- Final ruler: Murad III
- Titles: Bey
- Deposition: 1702

The Muradid dynasty was a dynasty of beys that ruled Tunisia from 1613 to 1702. They were succeeded in 1705 by the Husainid dynasty.

== History ==
The dynasty was founded by Murad I Bey, a janissary of Corsican origin. Ramdan Bey, ruler of Tunis, had sponsored the Corsican Murad since his youth. After Ramdan's death in 1613, Murad then followed his benefactor into the office of Bey, which he exercised effectively until 1631. Eventually he was also named Pasha by the Ottoman sultan though his position as Bey remained inferior to that of the Dey. He then resigned his positions and his son Hamuda Bey (reigned 1631–1666) inherited both titles, with the support of the local notables of Tunis. By virtue of his title as Pasha, the Bey came to enjoy the prestige of connection with the Sultan-Caliph in Constantinople. In 1640, at the death of the Dey, Hamuda Bey maneuvered to establish his control over appointments to that office.

Under Murad II Bey (reigned 1666–1675), son of Hamuda, the Diwan again functioned as a council of notables. Yet in 1673 the janissary deys, seeing their power ebbing, rose in revolt. During the consequent fighting, the urban forces of the janissary deys fought against the Muradids with their largely rural forces under the tribal shaykhs, and with popular support from city notables. As the Beys secured victory, so did the rural Bedouins and the Tunisian notables, who also emerged triumphant. The Arabic language returned to local official use, although the Muradids continued to use Turkish in the central government, accentuating their elite status and Ottoman connection.

At Murad II Bey's death, internal discord with the Muradid family led to the outbreak of armed struggle, known as the Revolutions of Tunis. This period of unrest lasted from the death of Murad II Bey in 1675 until the seizure of power by the Husainid Al-Husayn I ibn Ali at-Turki in 1705. The Turkish rulers of Algeria intervened on behalf of one side in the conflict; the Algerian forces did not withdraw and proved unpopular. The last Muradid Bey, Murad III, was assassinated in 1702 by Ibrahim Sharif, who then ruled for several years with Algerian backing.

== Rulers of Muradid Dynasty ==
No.	Ruler Name	Reign start	Reign end
1.	Murad I	1613	1631
2.	Hammuda Bey	1631	1666
3.	Murad II Bey	1666	1675
4.	Mohamed Bey	1675	1696
5.	Ramadan bey	1696	1699
6.	Murad III Bey	1699	1702
7.	Ibrahim Sharif	1702	1705

== See also ==
- History of Ottoman-era Tunisia
- Mohamed Bey El Mouradi
- Revolutions of Tunis
- Architecture of Tunisia
