= Divan =

High government ministry in various Islamic states

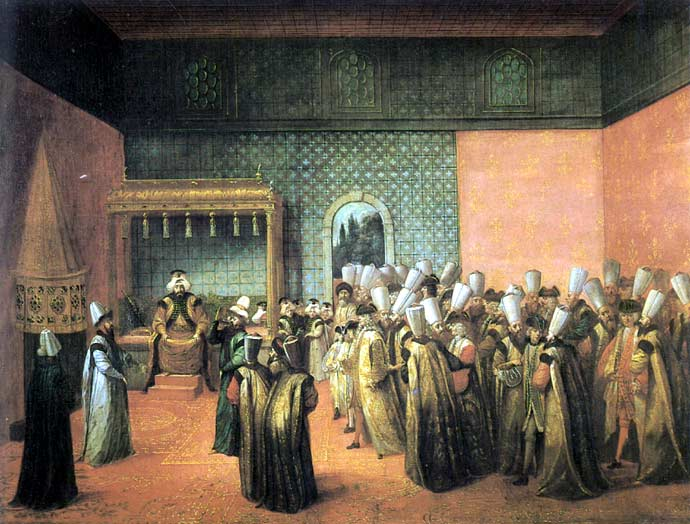
Audience in the Diwan-i-Khas granted to the French ambassador, the vicomte d'Andrezel by Ottoman Sultan Ahmed III, 10 October 1724, in a contemporary painting by Jean-Baptiste van Mour.

A divan or diwan (Persian: دیوان, dīvān; from Sumerian dub, clay tablet) was a high government ministry in various Islamic states, or its chief official (see dewan).

== Etymology ==
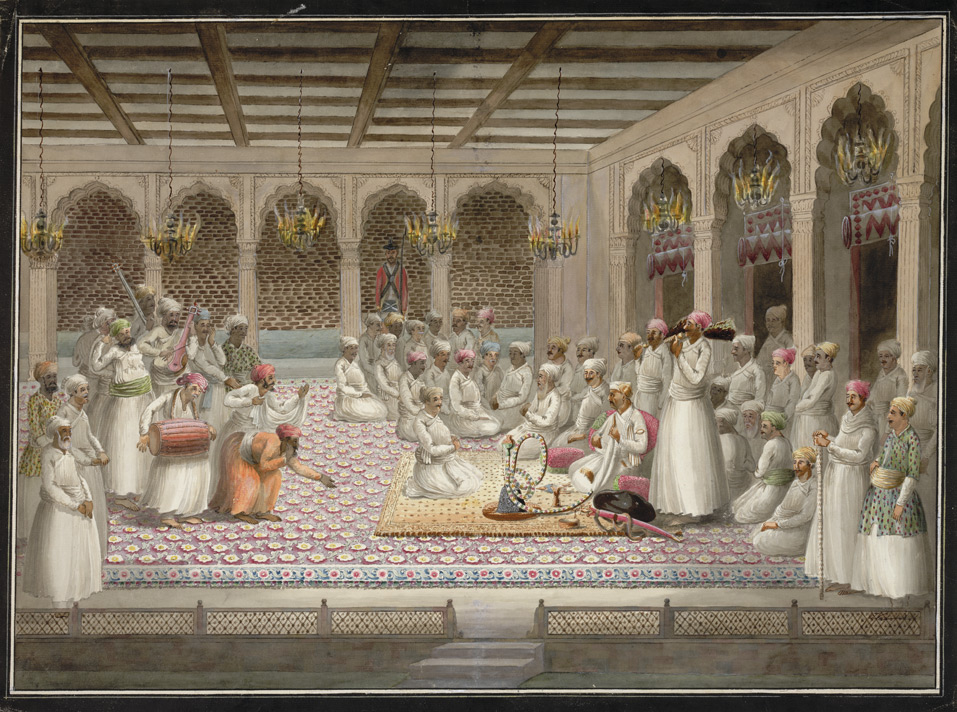
The winter Diwan of a Mughal Nawab (painting from 1812)

The word, recorded in English since 1586, meaning "Oriental council of a state", comes from Persian دیوان (dêvân) and consequently spread via Turkish divan.

It is first attested in Middle Persian spelled as dpywʾn and dywʾn, itself hearkening back, via Old Persian, Elamite and Akkadian, ultimately to Sumerian dub, clay tablet. The word was borrowed into Armenian as well as divan; on linguistic grounds this is placed after the 3rd century, which helps establish the original Middle Persian (and eventually New Persian) form was dīvān, not dēvān, despite later legends that traced the origin of the word to the latter form. The variant pronunciation dēvān however did exist, and is the form surviving to this day in Tajiki Persian.

In Arabic, the term was first used for the army registers, then generalized to any register, and by metonymy applied to specific government departments. The sense of the word evolved to "custom house" and "council chamber", then to "long, cushioned seat", such as are found along the walls in Middle-Eastern council chambers. The latter is the sense that entered European languages as divan (furniture).

The modern French, Dutch, Spanish, and Italian words douane, aduana, and dogana, respectively (meaning "customs house"), also come from diwan.

== Creation and development under the early caliphates ==
=== Establishment and Umayyad period ===
The first dīwān was created under Caliph Umar (r. 634–644 CE) in 15 A.H. (636/7 CE) or, more likely, 20 A.H. (641 CE). It comprised the names of the warriors of Medina who participated in the Muslim conquests and their families, and was intended to facilitate the payment of salary (ʿaṭāʾ, in coin or in rations) to them, according to their service and their relationship to Muhammad. This first army register (dīwān al-jund) was soon emulated in other provincial capitals like Basra, Kufa and Fustat. Al-Mughira ibn Shu'ba, a statesman from the Thaqif tribe who was versed in Persian, is credited with establishing Basra's dīwān during his governorship (636–638), and the dīwān of the Caliphate's other garrison centers followed its organization.

With the advent of the Umayyad Caliphate, the number of dīwāns increased. To the dīwān al-jund, the first Umayyad caliph, Mu'awiya (r. 661–680), added the bureau of the land tax (dīwān al-kharāj) in Damascus, which became the main dīwān, as well as the bureau of correspondence (dīwān al-rasāʾil), which drafted the caliph's letters and official documents, and the bureau of the seal (dīwān al-khātam), which checked and kept copies of all correspondence before sealing and dispatching it. A number of more specialist departments were also established, probably by Mu'awiya: the dīwān al-barīd in charge of the postal service; the bureau of expenditure (dīwān al-nafaqāt), which most likely indicates the survival of a Byzantine institution; the dīwān al-ṣadaqa was a new foundation with the task of estimating the zakāt and ʿushr levies; the dīwān al-mustaghallāt administered state property in cities; the dīwān al-ṭirāz controlled the government workshops that made official banners, costumes and some furniture. Aside from the central government, there was a local branch of the dīwān al-kharāj, the dīwān al-jund and the dīwān al-rasāʾil in every province.

Under Caliph Abd al-Malik (r. 685–705), the practices of the various departments began to be standardized and Arabized: instead of the local languages (Greek in Syria, Coptic and Greek in Egypt, Persian in the former Sasanian lands) and the traditional practices of book-keeping, seals and time-keeping, only Arabic and the Islamic calendar were to be used henceforth. The process of Arabization was gradual: in Iraq, the transition was carried out by Salih ibn Abd al-Rahman under the auspices of the governor al-Hajjaj ibn Yusuf in 697, in Syria by Sulayman ibn Sa'd al-Khushani in 700, in Egypt under Caliph al-Walid I's governor Abdallah ibn Abd al-Malik in 706, and in Khurasan by Ishaq ibn Tulayq al-Nahshali on the orders of Yusuf ibn Umar al-Thaqafi, governor of Iraq, in 741/42.

=== Abbasid period ===
Under the Abbasid Caliphate the administration, partly under the increasing influence of Iranian culture, became more elaborate and complex. As part of this process, the dīwāns increased in number and sophistication, reaching their apogee in the 9th–10th centuries. At the same time, the office of vizier (wazīr) was also created to coordinate government. The administrative history of the Abbasid dīwāns is complex, since many were short-lived, temporary establishments for specific needs, while at times the sections of larger dīwān might also be termed dīwāns, and often a single individual was placed in charge of more than one department.

Caliph al-Saffah (r. 749–754) established a department for the confiscated properties of the Umayyads after his victory in the Abbasid Revolution. This was probably the antecedent of the later dīwān al-ḍiyāʿ, administering the caliph's personal domains. Similarly, under al-Mansur (r. 754–775) there was a bureau of confiscations (dīwān al-muṣādara), as well as a dīwān al-aḥshām, probably in charge of palace service personnel, and a bureau of petitions to the Caliph (dīwān al-riḳāʿ). Caliph al-Mahdi (r. 775–785) created a parallel dīwān al-zimām (control bureau) for every one of the existing dīwāns, as well as a central control bureau (zimām al-azimma). These acted as comptrollers as well as coordinators between the various bureaus, or between individual dīwāns and the vizier. In addition, a dīwān al-maẓālim was created, staffed by judges, to hear complaints against government officials. The remit of the dīwān al-kharāj now included all land taxes (kharāj, zakāt, and jizya, both in money and in kind), while another department, the dīwān al-ṣadaqa, dealt with assessing the zakāt of cattle. The correspondence of the dīwān al-kharāj was checked by another department, the dīwān al-khātam. As in Umayyad times, miniature copies of the dīwān al-kharāj, the dīwān al-jund and the dīwān al-rasāʾil existed in every province, but by the mid-9th century each province also maintained a branch of its dīwān al-kharāj in the capital.

The treasury department (bayt al-māl or dīwān al-sāmī) kept the records of revenue and expenditure, both in money and in kind, with specialized dīwāns for each category of the latter (e.g. cereals, cloth, etc.). Its secretary had to mark all orders of payment to make them valid, and it drew up monthly and yearly balance sheets. The dīwān al-jahbad̲ha, responsible for the treasury's balance sheets, was eventually branched off from it, while the treasury domains were placed under the dīwān al-ḍiyāʿ, of which there appear at times to have been several. In addition, a department of confiscated property (dīwān al-musādarīn) and confiscated estates (dīwān al-ḍiyāʿ al-maqbūḍa) existed.

Caliph al-Mu'tadid (r. 892–902) grouped the branches of the provincial dīwāns present in the capital into a new department, the dīwān al-dār (bureau of the palace) or dīwān al-dār al-kabīr (great bureau of the palace), where "al-dār" probably meant the vizier's palace. At the same time, the various zimām bureaux were combined into a single dīwān al-zimām which re-checked all assessments, payments and receipts against its own records and, according to the 11th-century scholar al-Mawardi, was the "guardian of the rights of bayt al-māl [the treasury] and the people". The dīwān al-nafaḳāt played a similar role with regards to expenses by the individual dīwāns, but by the end of the 9th century its role was mostly restricted to the finances of the caliphal palace. Under al-Muktafi (r. 902–908) the dīwān al-dār was broken up into three departments, the bureaux of the eastern provinces (dīwān al-mashriq), of the western provinces (dīwān al-maghrib), and of the Iraq (dīwān al-sawād), although under al-Muqtadir (r. 908–932) the dīwān al-dār still existed, with the three territorial departments considered sections of the latter. In 913/4, the vizier Ali ibn Isa established a new department for charitable endowments (dīwān al-birr), whose revenue went to the upkeep of holy places, the two holy cities of Mecca and Medina, and on volunteers fighting in the holy war against the Byzantine Empire.

Under Caliph al-Mutawakkil (r. 847–861), a bureau of servants and pages (dīwān al-mawālī wa ’l-ghilmān), possibly an evolution of the dīwān al-aḥshām, existed for the huge number of slaves and other attendants of the palace. In addition, the dīwān al-khātam, now also known as the dīwān al-sirr (bureau of confidential affairs) grew in importance. Miskawayh also mentions the existence of a dīwān al-ḥaram, which supervised the women's quarters of the palace.

== Later Islamic dynasties ==
As the Abbasid Caliphate began to fragment in the mid-9th century, its administrative machinery was copied by the emergent successor dynasties, with the already extant local dīwān branches likely providing the base on which the new administrations were formed.

=== Saffarids, Ziyarid, Sajids, Buyids and Samanids ===
The administrative machinery of the Tahirid governors of Khurasan is almost unknown, except that their treasury was located in their capital of Nishapur. Ya'qub al-Saffar (r. 867–879), the founder of the Saffarid dynasty who supplanted the Tahirids, is known to have had a bureau of the army (dīwān al-ʿarḍ) for keeping the lists and supervising the payment of the troops, at his capital Zarang. Under his successor Amr ibn al-Layth (r. 879–901) there were two further treasuries, the māl-e khāṣṣa, and an unnamed bureau under the chief secretary corresponding to a chancery (dīwān al-rasāʾil or dīwān al-inshāʾ).

The Buyids, who took over Baghdad and the remains of the Abbasid Caliphate in 946, drew partly on the established Abbasid practice, but was adapted to suit the nature of the rather decentralized Buyid "confederation" of autonomous emirates. The Buyid bureaucracy was headed by three great departments: the dīwān al-wazīr, charged with finances, the dīwān al-rasāʾil as the state chancery, and the dīwān al-jaysh for the army. The Buyid regime was a military regime, its ruling caste composed of Turkish and Daylamite troops. As a result, the army department was of particular importance, and its head, the ʿariḍ al-jaysh, is frequently mentioned in the sources of the period. Indeed, at the turn of the 11th century, there were two ʿariḍs, one for the Turks and one for the Daylamites, hence the department was often called "department of the two armies" (dīwān al-jayshayn). A number of junior departments, like the dīwān al-zimām, the dīwān al-ḍiyāʿ, or the dīwān al-barīd were directly inherited from the Abbasid government. Under Adud al-Dawla (r. 978–983), however, the dīwān al-sawād, which oversaw the rich lands of lower Iraq, was moved from Baghdad to Shiraz. In addition, a dīwān al-khilāfa was established to oversee the affairs of the Abbasid caliphs, who continued to reside in Baghdad as puppets of the Buyid emirs.

=== Seljuks ===
The Great Seljuks tended to cherish their nomadic origins, with their sultans leading a peripatetic court to their various capitals. Coupled with their frequent absence on campaign, the vizier assumed an even greater prominence, concentrating the direction of civil, military and religious affairs in his own bureau, the "supreme dīwān" (dīwān al-aʿlā). The dīwān al-aʿlā was further subdivided into a chancery (dīwān al-inshāʾ wa’l-ṭughrā, also called dīwān al-rasāʾil) under the ṭughrāʾī or munshī al-mamālik, an accounting department (dīwān al-zimām wa’l-istīfāʾ) under the mustawfī al-mamālik, a fiscal oversight office (dīwān al-ishrāf or dīwān al-muʿāmalāt) under the mushrif al-mamālik, and the army department (dīwān al-ʿarḍ or dīwān al-jaysh) under the ʿariḍ (further divided into the recruitment and supply bureau, dīwān al-rawātib, and the salary and land grants bureau, dīwān al-iqṭāʾ). A number of lesser departments is also attested, although they may not have existed at the same time: the office charged with the redress of grievances (dīwān al-maẓālim), the state treasury (bayt al-māl) and the sultan's private treasury (bayt al-māl al-khaṣṣ), confiscations (dīwān al-muṣādara), the land tax office (dīwān al-kharāj) and the department of religious endowments or waqfs (dīwān al-awqāf). A postal department (dīwān al-barīd) also existed but fell into disuse. The system was apparently partly copied in provincial centres as well.

=== Ottoman Tripolitania ===
Following the Ottoman conquest of North Africa, the Maghreb was divided into three provinces, Algiers, Tunis, and Tripoli. After 1565, administrative authority in Tripoli was vested in a Pasha directly appointed by the Sultan in Constantinople. The sultan provided the pasha with a corps of Janissaries, which was in turn divided into a number of companies under the command of a junior officer or Bey. The Janissaries quickly became the dominant force in Ottoman Libya. As a self-governing military guild answerable only to their own laws and protected by a Divan (in this context, a council of senior officers who advised the Pasha), the Janissaries soon reduced the Pasha to a largely ceremonial role.

== Government councils ==
The Divan-ı Hümayun or Sublime Porte was for many years the council of ministers of the Ottoman Empire. It consisted of the Grand Vizier, who presided, and the other viziers, the kadi'askers, the nisanci, and the defterdars.

The Assemblies of the Danubian Principalities under Ottoman rule were also called "divan" ("Divanuri" in Romanian) (see Akkerman Convention, ad hoc Divan).

In Malay and related languages, the cognate Dewan is the standard word for chamber, as in the Dewan Perwakilan Rakyat or Chamber of People's Representatives.

== Ministerial departments ==
In the sultanate of Morocco, several portfolio Ministries had a title based on Diwan:

- Diwan al-Alaf: Ministry of War.
- Diwan al-Bahr: 'Ministry of the Sea', i.e. (overseas=) Foreign Ministry.
- Diwan al-Shikayat (or - Chikayat): Ministry of Complaints (Ombudsman).

== Sources ==
- Bosworth, C. E. (1995). "DĪVĀN – ii. GOVERNMENT OFFICE". In Yarshater, Ehsan (ed.). Encyclopaedia Iranica. Vol. VII. pp. 432–438.
- de Blois, François (1995). "DĪVĀN – i. THE TERM". In Yarshater, Ehsan (ed.). Encyclopaedia Iranica. Vol. VII. p. 432.
- Duri, A. A. (1991). "Dīwān i.—The caliphate". The Encyclopedia of Islam, New Edition, Volume II: C–G. Leiden and New York: BRILL. pp. 323–327. ISBN 90-04-07026-5.
- Holt, P. M.; Lambton, Ann K. S.; Lewis, Bernard, eds. (1977). The Cambridge History of Islam, Volume 2B: Islamic Society and Civilization. Cambridge University Press. ISBN 978-0-521-29138-5.
- Korobeinikov, Dimitri (2014). Byzantium and the Turks in the Thirteenth Century. Oxford: Oxford University Press. ISBN 978-0-19-870826-1.
- Lambton, Ann K. S. (1988). Continuity and Change in Medieval Persia. Albany, New York: State University of New York Press. ISBN 0-88706-133-8.
- Sprengling, M. (April 1939). "From Persian to Arabic". The American Journal of Semitic Languages and Literatures. 56 (2). The University of Chicago Press: 175–224. doi:10.1086/370538. JSTOR 528934.
- Wellhausen, Julius (1927). The Arab Kingdom and Its Fall. Translated by Margaret Graham Weir. Calcutta: University of Calcutta.
