= Siege of Tunis (1705) =

Part of the Tunisian-Algerian War

- Part of the Tunisian–Algerian War (1705)
Date	28 August 1705 – 9 October 1705
Location	Tunis, Tunisia 36°48′23″N 10°10′54″E
Result	Peace Treaty: Husayn Bey pays a ransom of 150,000 Pisatres
Territorial changes	Very minor, or no changes.

Belligerents
Regency of Algiers: Various Tunisian arab tribes.	Beylik of Tunis

Commanders and leaders
Hadj Moustapha	Al-Husayn I ibn Ali

Strength
30,000: 10,000 Tunisian Arabs	18,000

Casualties and losses
Low	Unknown

The Siege of Tunis (1705) was a military engagement fought between the Regency of Algiers and the Beylik of Tunis, and was the final major engagement of the Tunisian–Algerian War (1705).

== Background ==
After the Algerian Army entered Tunisia on 8 July 1705, the Bey of Tunis Ibrahim el Sharif surrendered in El Kef and was imprisoned by Moustapha and sent to Algiers. His agha and Khaznadar , Al Husayn I ibn Ali, decided to retreat and go back to Tunis, where he would proclaim himself Bey, and by the Tunisian divan and founder of a new dynasty, the Husainids. But his new reign as Bey wouldn't be as peaceful as he intended, as the Algerians were on their way to besiege the capital of the country, the Bey quickly reinforced the city as a ditch was dug around the capital, the walls were reinforced along with the doors who were consolidated, and the increase of the effectiveness of the army.

== Siege ==
After refusing multiple peace treaties that Husayn proposed to Moustapha, he started his journey to Tunis. He eventually stopped for a couple of days in the city of Tébourba leaving nothing behind. When the Dey arrived in front of the capital, he took a position in Ben-Medjous on 28 August, along with his army of 40,000 soldiers. The bey however only had 18,000 men protecting the city.

The Bey, despite his useless attempts against the Dey, he would always refuse the peace treaties proposed by the Algerians, while the population of Tunis protested for peace even though with what happened in Kef and Tébourba, Husayn would finally pay the Dey a ransom of 150,000 piastres in exchange for peace and the evacuation of Tunisian territory, but Moustapha would eventually leave after he noted the coming of the bad season and multiple Arabs that were on his side deserted as there was no more to pillage, The Dey would eventually leave in the night of 9 October, leaving behind him the majority of his treasures and military equipment sent by the governor of Bône.

== Aftermath ==
For the Algerians, a small cavalry was sent by Husayn to harras them on their way back to Algiers, they would meet in the plain of Sedira near the city of Majaz al-Bab, but would be quickly defeated suffering 500 losses, even tho the Dey won this battle again, he would suffer from another revolt in Algiers, leaving Hussein Khodja as his new successor.

For the Tunisians, peace wouldn't be achieved as another political dispute erupted between the Bey Husayn and his Dey Mohamed Khodja, as he was a brave participant during the siege against the Algerians. He would be kicked out of the capital, and Husayn would elect Kara Moustapha of Monastir; angered by this, he would try to ally with the old Bey Ibrahim after he was freed from Algiers by the new elected Dey. He would eventually die after a revolution erupted in Tunis in favor of Husayn, he was meant to meet Ibrahim in Porto Farina but would suffer the same treatment as Mohamed, he was buried beside one of the town's forts.
