= Mustapha ben Ibrahim Pacha =

Mustapha Pacha
- Dey of Algiers
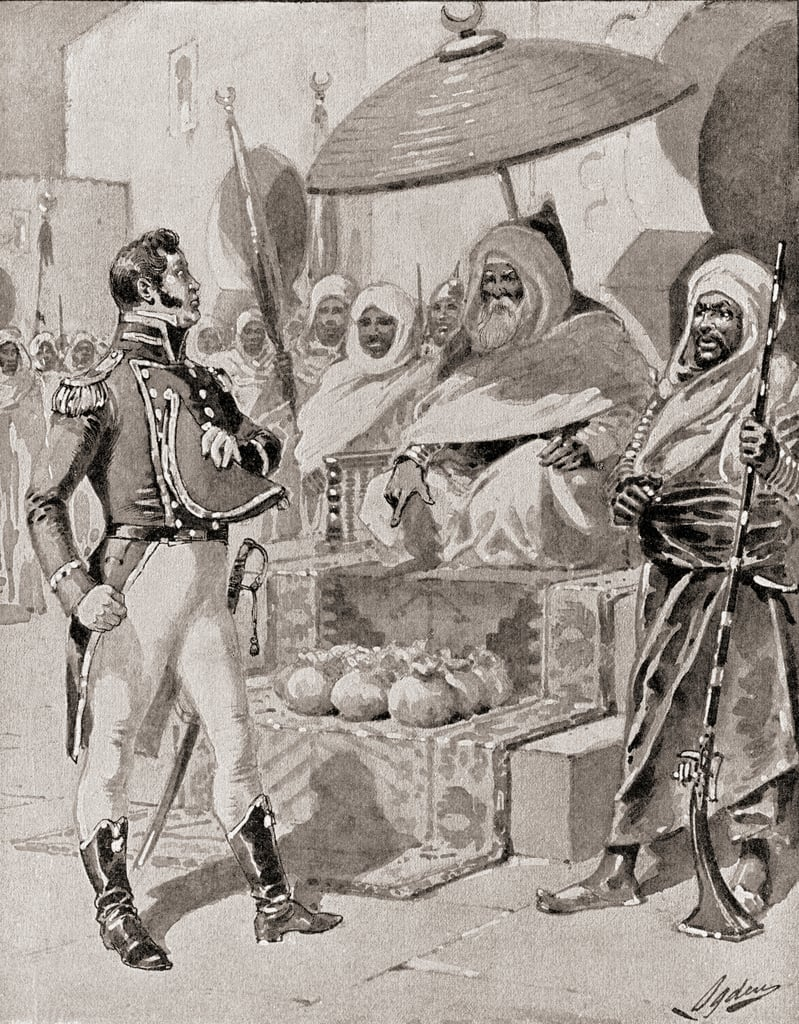
- Drawing of captain William Bainbridge paying tribute to the Dey Mustapha

20th Dey of Algiers
- Reign: 1 May 1798 – 31 August 1805
- Predecessor: Sidi Hassan
- Successor: Ahmed bin Ali Khodja
- Born: Mustapha Ibn Bekir Pacha; Algiers, Regency of Algiers
- Burial: Zawiya Thaalibia
- Country: Regency of Algiers
- Religion: Islam
- Occupation: Khaznadar (12 July 1791 – 1 May 1798); Dey (1 May 1798 – 31 August 1805)

Mustapha Pacha or Mustapha ben Ibrahim Pacha was the 20th ruler and Dey of Algiers. He ruled for seven years after his predecessor Sidi Hassan.

== Rule ==
=== Early career ===
Mustapha was the grandson of Mohammed ben-Osman and nephew of his predecessor Sidi Hassan, He had the title of Khaznadar and shortly after Hasan's death he took the title of Dey. But at the same time about fifty of Janissaires raided and pillaged the Jenina, in reaction the Ouakhil al-Kharadj gathered troops and killed some of them, some were strangled and some beaten to death. Mustapha however, felt that he was not worthy of such title and even told to the agha of the spahis that he would maybe take the title instead.

=== Biography ===
The French consuls described him as fearful, ignorant, brutal, and often experiencing moments of pure madness, a trait which became common among his predecessors. He had previously worked as a charcoal worker and swept the door of Ouakhil al-Kharadj. His elevation to Khaznadar is granted to Naphtali Busnash, a Jewish Italian immigrant who served as the Advisor of the dey Mustapha. In addition to being the chief of the Jewish community in Algiers, he also founded the Bakri-Busnach company.

His greedy actions included stealing his uncle's treasures and even murdering his wife and brother-in-law, and at one point he used to extort money from the consuls of the other world nations. The beys of Titteri and Constantine were removed from their title, each in 1801 and 1803 and imprisoned them, the son of Mohamed el Kebir, Othman saw his goods taken from him by the dey.

The European consuls were not treated the best, during his reign, the Swedish consul almost lost his head after narrowly dodging a saber, Sweden would not react to this incident unless they wanted even more conflict in the Mediterranean.

=== Political activities ===
==== France ====
===== The French invasion of Egypt =====
The general of the French army, Napoleon Bonaparte, had recently launched a considerable naval fleet to invade Malta. The Algerians after hearing the news feared that this fleet was going for them, but the emotions quickly changed as it was revealed that Napoleon had captured the island of Malta. The diwan also had heard that a considerable amount of Barbary pirates would be set free only if the Maltese, Genoese and Venetian were also liberated. When most of the French army arrived in Egypt and war was declared between the Ottoman Empire and France, the Algerian Diwan and Mustapha were neutral to these events, even though the Ottoman sultan had ordered all the Barbary states to join for the ottoman cause. However the Dey would be forced to declare war on the republic, even though Algiers wasn't fond of treating France as an enemy state as the empire wanted, the Sublime Porte sent a first firman who ordered Mustapha to declare war on France, but the Dey would finally agree to the Sultan's order as the British were more heard in Istanbul than in Algiers, the French consul M. of Moltedo would be imprisoned.

When letters from the recently imprisoned French consul where he described how fairly he was treated even though in jail, Dubois-Thainville was named "General Consul in Algiers" and sent by the French First consul to the city to discuss peace, and arrived in the city on 13 May 1800, when Dubois presented the letter from the first consul who recently revealed to be Napoleon, Mustapha remembered hearing about Napoleon as the young general who freed the Algerian pirates jailed in the Italian cities he encountered and Malta. This was another great reason for the Dey to improve his relations with the Republic, which transformed the armistice proposed by Dubois into a definitive treaty in September 30 and received a million francs after that, but this peace would not last as after the British forced the Sublime porte to end this treaty, which made Mustapha declare war on France for the second time on January 25, 1801. Jerome bonaparte, Brother of Napoleon, would manage to release all French slaves in Algiers for 400.000 francs in 1805.

===== Ténès incident =====
Even though peace was signed with the sublime porte in 1802, the Algerian pirates would seize 2 French ships near the city of Tenes, but Napoleon however was furious that the French pavilion was insulted and replied with threats and intimidation, and even threatened to embark with a fleet of 80.000 men to Algiers, the eventually accepted and in conclusion wrote:

Because an oath belongs to me, and your consul, Deboat Neville, assured me that, I expect to settle the French debts to Bakri. I'm waiting for your directions.

— Mustapha Pacha, 1802

==== Troubles with the British ====
In the same year, the relations with the London were still unstable as affairs between England and Bakri-Busnach Company, this almost led to the bombardment of the city of Algiers by Admiral Nelson after the Dey refused to meet the English consul Falcon in 1802. Consul Falcon would again almost lead to the bombardment of the city, as he was caught with Turkish women in his residence, the chaouchs of the El Mechouar beat the women and kicked Falcon, a couple days later, Horatio Nelson showed at the bay of the city "and demanded satisfaction for the outrage committed", Mustapha replied that he would not fear to protect himself if he was attacked, and Algiers citizens and consuls were already preparing for the bombardment, but to the surprise of everyone Nelson would weigh anchor and leave Algiers. He would briefly return asking for Mustapha to apologize for some of his acts, the Dey would refuse and Nelson who had the order to not push to the extreme, simply left after putting a new consul.

== Death ==
Mustapha dey survived multiple assassination attempts, the first one on 21 March 1805: Mustapha was attacked by four Janissaries who fired on him. Even though two bullets hit him, he grabbed his sword and fought against the assassins who were charging at him with yatagans. Along with his 2 chaouchs, he suffered multiple injuries in the head and in both arms. In the first days of May, he was in another ambush, this time he lost two fingers from his right hand, and almost die after being shot three times, his Khaznadar also suffered numerous sabre hits.

Meanwhile, on 28 June at 7 in the morning, Busnash was sitting in the sun shortly after he exited the Jenina. A Janissary named Yahia came up behind him, shot him three times, and shout "Hello to the king of Algiers!" but Busnash did not die from it; he managed to get back to his home and died shortly after noon. The reason for this assassination is described that, everyone in Algiers raised against him, he was hated by the poorest and wealthiest of the city, he was blamed for making the country starve, because Mustapha was ruling in a time were famine was becoming more noticeable in Algiers, his major grain trade said that was one of the main reasons for the recent events. When Bousnash was shot, the noubadjis of the Jenina went to protect him, in reaction Yahia shouted "I killed the Jew, are you the dogs of the Jew?" he was let back to the jannisary barrack and he was applauded by the other members of the militia. Fearing the danger, Mustapha sent to Yahia his Misbaha as a form of apology.

As the news of the death of Busnash was heard, everyone in Algiers began to the massacre as even the simple citizens and the Berbers of the city committed unimaginable acts of violence, and the applauds and acclamations of the women only encouraged the killing from the top of their balconies. Mustapha, fearing of losing his head, had accepted a letter sent by the Jannisaries to ask permission to massacre the Jews of the city to prevent them from revolting. The militias destroyed their stores and synagogues and between 200 and 500 Jews had lost their lives. The French consul managed to make some escape, saving them from the chaos that was ruling in the city.

Mustapha managed to exile some of them to Tunis, but his coward behaviour towards the militia would not be enough to save him, as on August 31, 1805, the Janissaires would proclaim Ahmed bin Ali Khodja as Dey, the old Khodjet el Khil who removed from his title by Busnash before his death. The Dey would let the militia pillage the Jenina's treasures, hoping that they would let him exile to the Levant, but as they refused, him and his Khaznadar try to look for a way to escape, they would both be murdered at the door of a mosque. After being strangled, his body would be paraded by the population and then thrown outside Bab Azzoun and buried at Bab El Oued, before being moved to the Mausoleum of Sidi Abderrahmane Et-Thaalibi.
