= Mohamed Ibn Bekir =

- Dey of Algiers
- Sketch of Mohamed Ibn Bekir in his palace

16th Dey of Algiers
- Reign: 3 February 1748 – 11 December 1754
- Predecessor: Ibrahim Kouchouk
- Successor: Baba Ali Bou Sebaa
- Born: 1684
- Died: 1754; Algiers, Regency of Algiers
Names
- Mohamed Ibn Bekir or Mohamed Khodja
- Country: Regency of Algiers
- Religion: Islam
- Occupation: Khodjet al Khil, then Dey

Mohamed Ibn Bekir or Mohamed Khodja, was the 16th ruler and Dey of Algiers. He ruled for 6 years after his predecessor Ibrahim Kouchouk.

== Rule ==
=== Biography ===
Mohamed was the Khodjet al Khil or minister of the cavalry of the state of Algiers, but when Ibrahim died, he was elected as his successor. He was described as intelligent and had a great reputation for his humanity, he was also nicknamed the one-eyed, and also was frequently called as superior to his predecessors. In the first year of his rule, he successfully managed to wipe out any rebels that were present in the state, and re-established order in the state and the capital, or as the consul Thomas described « Never, has the city been so peaceful; it is now as well policed as no other in europe, which was not the case as his predecessors, and especially under the last Dey, who allowed the soldiers to live with unbridled license. »

=== Political activities ===
Mohamed created the Fundamental pact of 1748 or also called ʿAhd al-Amān, who is a fundamental political-military decreed on February 3, 1748, who defines the rights of the subjects of the Dey and all inhabitants of the regency, this also granted more rights for the Kouloughlis after the revolts of 1747–1748 in Tlemcen. The Dey also managed to keep good relations with the Dutch, Swedish and Danish kingdoms, who in the recent years offered considerable donations for the regency.

=== Crusade of Oran ===
Benedict XIV, who was the pope and head of the Catholic Church at the time, was preparing a large crusade against the regency, with also the contribution of Christian states like the Two Sicilies, Knights of Malta, Republic of Genoa and the Republic of Venice, who gathered more than 12,000 man who met in Oran, ready for the operations. Algiers was shaking, and asked for help to the ottoman sultan, Istanbul then responded that the disobedience and indiscipline of the Militia and Reis needed a severe punishment, but the crusade project would be aborted, through the greed of some and negligence of others, never was an Algiers so close from such danger.

=== Algiers and London ===
Three ships were accused of selling gunpowder to the Kabyles, the regency then imprisoned the crew and took their merchandise, even with the complaints of the consul Stanifford (Consul of Great Britain), it only brought threats to London. The Kingdom of Great Britain sent 7 ships in the head of admiral Keppel, he would arrive on August 9 and meet the Diwan of Algiers they day later, at the end of his unsuccessful negotiations, he only received dilatory responses and a promise of 2 ambassadors by the Diwan on September 19.

On July 10 of the next year, Keppel faced Algiers again, this time with only 4 ships, the Dey would refuse to meet him until the return of his own ambassadors in London, Keppel decided on September 16, to reappear in front of Algiers, this time his negotiations only set free around 20 captives, but as for the merchandise, the Divan responded with « It had been eaten », Keppel then continued his route to Tunis.

=== The Prépaud affair ===
In the month of September 1752, a merchant captain named Prépaud was sailing in the storm with his crew, in the distance he saw an Algerian both coming to his direction, without giving signals or approach the pavilion, the French captain opened fire as he thought it was a corsair of Salé, the French captain would eventually be surrender even after killing around 30 Turks. At his arrival in Algiers, he was dragged to the Jenina Palace by the parents and friends of the victims, the Dey didn't even listened to the defense of Prépaud and sentenced him to be beaten, the punishment was so severe the poor man died the next day in his cell, the rest of his crew was sent to the Bagne. The reclamations of the French consul M. Lemaire were useless as the Dey pretended to be in his right, saying that the blood of the victims cried for vengeance, and he would treat everyone that would attack one of his ships, although the consul managed to free the crew of Prépaud taking them with him on the month of April.

=== Death ===
The emotion was present in Algiers, and after the consul left, the Algerians knew that France would not hesitate to use fire for vengeance. On December 11, 1754, when he was paying the militia, an Albanian soldier named Ouzoun Ali, approached the dey pretending to lower his hand to give him a handshake, but hit Mohamed with his saber in the shoulder and finished him off with a pistol, the dey died at the age of 70 years old. The rebels would also strangle his Khaznadar, and Ouzoun would proclaim himself dey and would shout that he will double the payment of the militia. Unfortunately for him, he would be facing the Khodjet al Khil along with the guards of the Jenina, the Noubadjis, he would try to run but would sit back on the throne when he found out the doors were locked, accepting his fate. Finally, the votes all went to the agha of the spahis, Ali Melmouli, where he was brought from the country side.

== See also ==
- List of governors and rulers of the Regency of Algiers
