= Ibrahim Kouchouk =

- Dey of Algiers

15th Dey of Algiers
- Reign: 20 October 1745 – 3 February 1748
- Predecessor: Ibrahim ben Ramdan Dey
- Successor: Mohamed Ibn Bekir
- Born: 1700
- Died: 1748; Algiers, Regency of Algiers
Names
- Ibrahim IV or Ibrahim Kouchouk
- Country: Regency of Algiers
- Religion: Islam
- Occupation: Khaznadar, then Dey

Ibrahim Kouchouk, also known as Ibrahim el Seghir or Ibrahim IV, was the 15th ruler and Dey of Algiers. He ruled for 15 years after his predecessor Baba Abdi.

== Rule ==
His predecessor Ibrahim ben Ramdan, who suffered from dysentery, elected his nephew and Khaznadar (treasurer) as his successor and abdicated on October 20, 1745.

Ibrahim was 45 years old when he was first elected. The Dey first agreed on a peace treaty with the Danish Kingdom, paying an annual tribute with military equipment, and maintained good relations with the Kingdom of France.

Shortly after sitting on the throne, he would launch an expedition to the Regency of Tunis against the Bey Ali I Pasha, after attacking his neighbor Tripoli, and also ally of the Dey, and even told him to commit suicide. The Algerians entered the territory on April 6th, 1746. On their way the army had been reinforced by the troops of the Beylik of Constantine and indigenous Arabs. After putting the city of El Kef under siege, peace was quickly achieved thanks to the submissions that Ali made, and the need of Ibrahim to take his troops to Constantine.

After the Dey's return to Algiers, he had to face another rebellion in Tlemcen by the Kouloughlis of the Western Beylik, who dreamed of the reformation of the Kingdom of Tlemcen. Ibrahim mobilised his entire army against them and eventually defeated them, but ended up ordering the massacre of more of them, after their intentions of overthrowing the government of Algiers were confirmed.

He eventually died after being poisoned by the Kouloughlis. His khodjet al khil (Minister of Horses) Mohamed Ibn Bekir was elected as his successor.

== See also ==
- List of governors and rulers of the Regency of Algiers
