= Sidi Hassan =

- Dey of Algiers
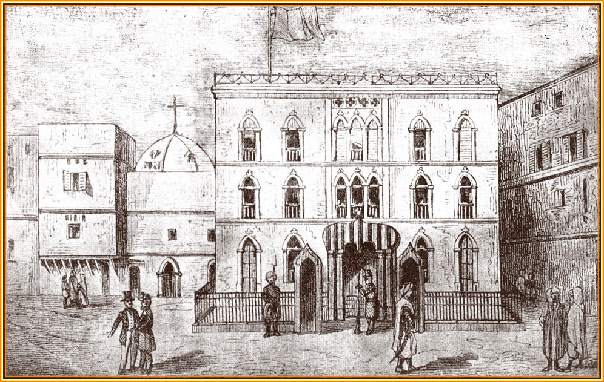
- Dar Hassan Pacha in 1844

19th Dey of Algiers
- Reign: 12 July 1791 – 1 May 1798
- Predecessor: Muhammad V ben Osman
- Successor: Mustapha ben Ibrahim Pacha
- Born: Sidi Hassan
- Died: 1 May 1798
- Issue: Lalla Khadidja; Lalla Fatma
Names
- حسن الثالث باشا داي
Regnal name
- Hassan Pacha or Hassan III Pacha
- Country: Regency of Algiers
- Father: Baba Mohammed ben-Osman (adoptive father)
- Religion: Islam
- Occupation: Ouakil al-kharadj (1776–1789); Khaznadar (1789 – 12 July 1791)
- Military career
- Conflicts: Capture of Tunis (1756)

Sidi Hassan, also known as Hassan Pacha or Hassan III Pacha, was the 19th ruler and Dey of Algiers. He ruled for 11 years after his predecessor Baba Mohammed ben-Osman.

== Early career ==
Sidi Hassan, or Hassan ibn Yusuf Ahiskavi, came to Algeria from Southern Georgia, town and vicinity of Ahaltsikhe. Sidi Hassan, before becoming dey, was the adopted son of his predecessor, Muhammad Ben Othman, he had the title of Ouakhil al-Kharadj (or minister of foreign affairs) in 1776 and contributed with the diplomatic relations between Algiers and Spain. He then was given the title of Khaznadar by Muhammad in 1789, and became Dey instantly when Ben Othman died.

== Rule ==
=== Biography ===
Sidi Hassan was known for his gentle and compassionate character, to the extent that he nearly abolished the death penalty for certain crimes and worked to improve conditions for slaves. However, as his reign continued, he became increasingly wary and suspicious, similar to some of his predecessors.

He was described by U.S. consul to Algiers from 1795 to 1797 Joel Barlow as the following:

... his feet [were] shod with buskins bound upon his legs with diamond buttons in loops of pearl; round his waist was a broad sash glittering with jewels, to which was suspended a broad scimitar, its sheath of the finest velvet. In his sash were stuck a poignard and a pair of pistols, said to have been a present from the late unfortunate Louis XVI; the dagger was of pure gold. Upon the Dey's head was a turban with the point erect, which is stylistically peculiar to the royal family. A large diamond crescent shone conspicuously in the front, and on the back of which a socket received the quills of two large ostrich feathers....

— William Spencer, Algiers in the age of the corsairs, Patterns of Government

=== Political activities ===
In the first days of his rule, he had to deal with the current situation that was between Algiers and Spain, after the Bey of the Western Beylik conquered Oran and Mers el Kebir, a Spanish ambassador was sent in April 1791 to Algiers by the Spanish Empire, the king Charles IV offered the two cities to the Dey in exchange of a small Settlement in Oran, but the Diwan of Algiers refused. The ambassador came for the second time on 12 September, and found Sidi Hassan head of state, the dey finally concluded a peace treaty with Spain.

The treaty contained six major obligations.

1. Spain was allowed to build a Bastion near Ghazaouet and forced to pay an annual tribute of 150 000 francs or 4 million Spanish dollars after conversion.
2. The autorisation of fishing coral and, permission of paying 3 000 charges of wheat ?
3. The access to the port of Mers El Kebir for Spanish ships.
4. Oran gets handed to the Regency along with the fortifications of the city made by Bey Mustapha Bouchelaghem back in 1732.
5. The evacuation of Spanish troops and belongings must be gone from the city in a delay of 6 months.

the Spanish eventually left Oran as intended in March 1792, this treaty would be expensive for Spain as they agreed to pay an annual tribute of 120,000 pounds each year. The Dey would gift to the Sublime Porte the two golden keys of the city along with 2 jars from the fountain of the city as well, and would get in exchange a Kaftan

The Agha of the Spahis died in his cell (assumed to be a suicide) for unknown reasons, and the beys of Medea and Constantine were accused of being his partisan. The Bey of Titteri who was in Algiers for the payment of his tribute, was informed that the Chaouchs were looking for him and so he fled and hide in the sanctuary of Sidi Abdelkader El-Djilani, and was replaced with Mohammed El-Debbah. However, for the bey of Constantine, Salah Bey, who had occupied the post for 21 years, it wouldn't as easy, as he had a big influence in the city, and when he even proved that he was a man of war and man that deserved the title, such as in Algiers 1775. The Dey first sent Ibrahim Chergui, Caid of Sebaou, along with a company of 60 horsemen, Salah first wanted to flee to Annaba with his treasures, but the Turks loyal to him and his Kabyle bodyguards easily killed Ibrahim and all of the people with him. But after a revolt broke out in the city, Hassan sent Hussein Bey Ben-Bousnek or Ben-Hanak, along with the Ouakhil al-Kharadj and the Agha of the Spahis. They would corrupt the Jannisaries and successfully capture Salah Bey and strangle him on 1 September, his ministers would also die after long torture, and the victorious would return to Algiers with huge amounts of gold and precious Jewelry, such as a diamond necklace that salah was wearing when he was captured, that is worth 275 Million Dinars.

The powerful European, such as Venice, The Netherlands, Spain, Sweden and Great Britain started to go against France after the French Revolution, and left Algeria was a great ally, since France didn't wanted to lose its only source for wheat and cereals.

Even the Sidi Hassan, even after seeing the crumbling state that France was, the dey was determined of becoming the friend of the Republic. Even with the attempts of the English consul trying to corrupt the dey against the republic failed. the English seeing that they couldn't starve France, decided to try and corrupt the Jews of Algeria to protest against their own government ally, but when the French victories in Europe were heard, the opinions switched, and the conflict that was going on in Constantine with the, Hussein Bey ben Bousnek. After a peace treaty concluded with Portugal, that were blocking the access to the Atlantic Ocean from the Algerian pirates, shortly after encountering American ships, the French consul arranged a peace with the United States and where they are forced to pay 200,000 Piastres to the dey, 100,000 for the Beylik and another 200,000 for Algiers to free slaves, and an additional payment of 24,000 Piastres. Even tho the Ouakhil al-Kharadj and Khaznadar were unhappy with the treaty, their belongings were confiscated and exiled the Agha Mustapha to Istanbul, after he was titled Caid of Sebaou and because of his Kabyle independence thoughts, his exile was also used as a reason for the killing of the leader, El Haoussin Ben-Djamoun, Kabyle from the Flissa tribe, after his return from Hajj from Mecca, in reaction the tribe revolted for four years which would result in favor of the Berbers.

They dey would arrest the bey of Medea, after two years of reign, and replace him with El hadj Brahim Boursali in the month of August, and in November, Hassan Ben Bou-Hanek would be arrested and imprisoned by the dey in the profit of Sliman El-Ouznadji who would be his successor, but would be strangled by, Hadj-Mustapha-Ingliz (called "the British"), after his return from an invasion of Tunisia with 6,000 men, and even Mohamed El Kebir would die after his return from Algiers, likely poisoned.

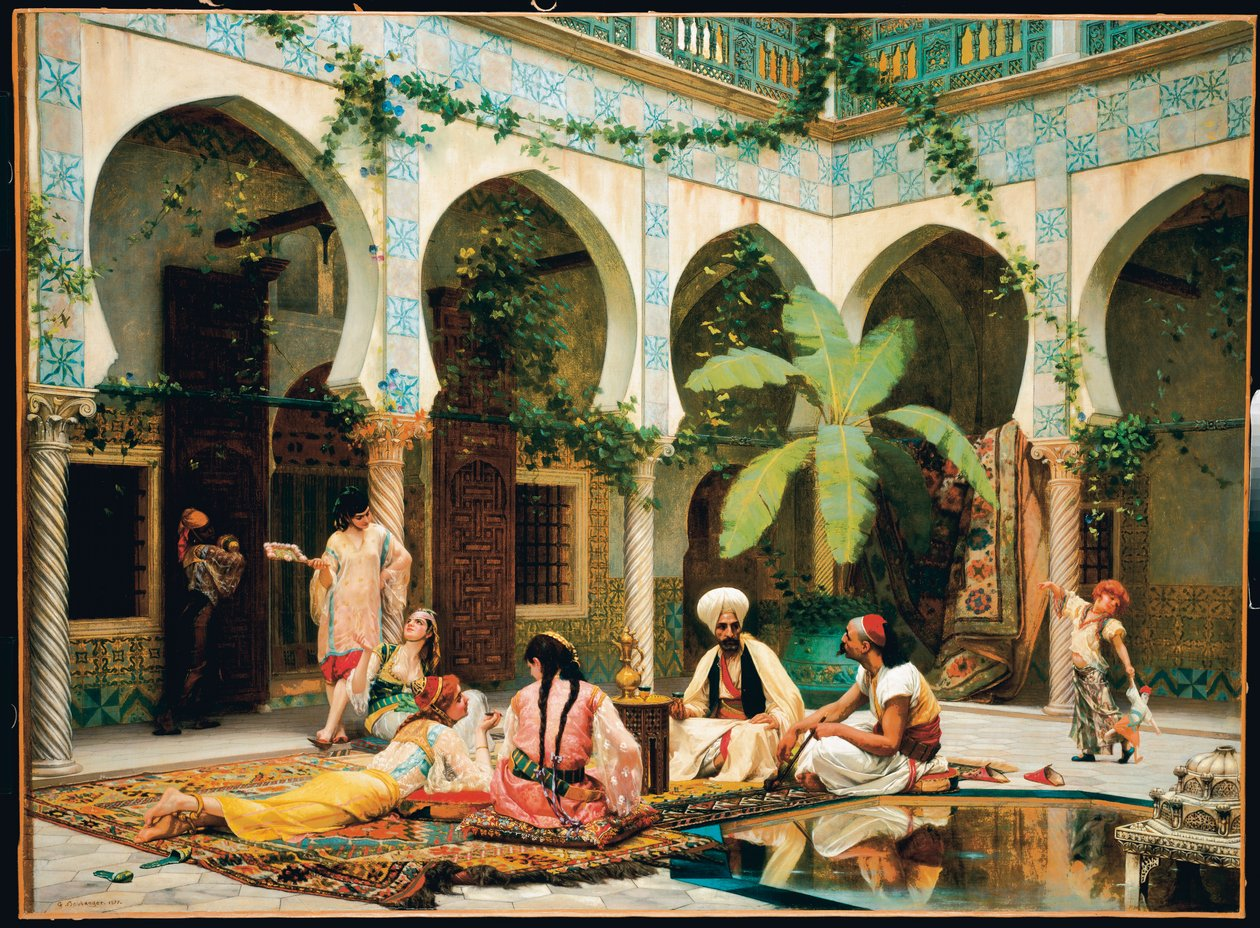
Painting of Dar Khedaoudj el Amia, a palace that holds the name of one of his daughters

=== Buildings ===
Shortly after his election, he launched the construction of Dar Hassan Pacha and a palace for his daughter who would hold its name, Dar Khedaoudj El-Amia, He would also lunch reparations for the Mosque Ketchaoua, and also ordered the built of Djamaa el Sefri.

=== Death ===
Poorly treated for an abscess on his foot, he died of Gangrene on 14 May 1798. Shortly after his death a riot broke out in Algiers and the Janissaires raided the Jenina, His Khaznadar and Nephew, Mustapha, was elected.

== See also ==
- List of governors and rulers of the Regency of Algiers
