= Baba Ali Bou Sebaa =

18th-century ruler (Dey) of Algiers

Baba Ali Bou Sabaa
- Dey of Algiers

17th Dey of Algiers
- Reign: 11 December 1754 – 2 February 1766
- Predecessor: Mohamed Ibn Bekir
- Successor: Baba Mohammed ben-Osman
- Born: Ali Melmouli
- Died: 1766; Algiers, Regency of Algiers
Names
- بابا علي الملمولي
- Country: Regency of Algiers
- Religion: Islam
- Occupation: Agha of the Spahis then Dey
- Military career
- Conflicts: Capture of Tunis (1756)

Baba Ali, also known as Bou Sebaa or Ali Melmouli or Baba Ali Neksîs, was the 17th ruler and Dey of Algiers. He ruled for 11 years after his predecessor Mohamed Ibn Bekir.

== Early life ==
Born in a small village in Asia, he grew up in a farm house and used to watch and handle the sheep. He used to talk about his experiences of this period of his life, remarking on how inscrutable the degrees of Providence often are.

== Rule ==
Before becoming Dey, Baba Ali was the agha of the spahis of the state of Algiers. A former donkey-driver, he was described as ignorant, brutal, fanatic, and tending to fall into fits of madness or imbecility, giving orders at random and calling them back after a few minutes, on the basis of asking the advice of some slave or sailor, to whom he would say "I am a donkey; you have more wit than me; decide!". He did not hide his origin and used to show his left hand, which was missing a thumb, recounting that he had been mutilated by one of his animals that he once took care of.

He always responded to the complaints he received by saying, "I am the leader of a band of thieves, and therefore my job is to take and not to return." He was also very mistrustful, and the starting of his reign was the beginning of a long series of executions. From his first day, he ordered the arrest of the remaining conspirators who had killed his predecessor on 11 December, and ended up impaling six, strangling four, and having others beaten to death.

A revolt broke out again in Algiers in the month of September, but would be maintained the same way as the last one, with multiple executions. During that time he would assure good relations with France and Great Britain, but would declare war on both the Netherlands and Tuscany for the benefit of the corso, Danemark and Sweden however would conclude peace with presents and gifts.

The war between the Netherlands and Algiers would last between (1755–57), the Algerian fleet was described weak by historians during the 1750s compared to 1715, the grain exports and trade of Algiers was almost non-existent due to the harsh weather and the earthquake that literally destroyed Algiers in 1755, were probably the reason of the weakness of the Regency. While inside the regency, the Kabyles revolted again and killed the Bey of Titteri, however in Tenes, the ruler of the city declared himself independent and even killed a company of Turks, the inhabitants fought bravely until they submitted.

In November 1755, the earthquake that hit Lisbon was also felt in Algiers but mainly in the coast of Morocco, the earthquake lasted two months, and just like in Lisbon, pillage and fires would add up to the disaster, a witness also reported that "there was not a single house left intact in Algiers". During this period the Bey of Tunis declared war on Algiers and went on an expedition against the bey of Constantine, Hassan Bey, who suffered 2 major defeats against him. Baba Ali would send an army of 5,000 soldiers to Constantine, they would take El Kef and Tunis after a siege of two months, the pillage lasted days and even the Christian consuls weren't spared, except for the English consuls. But the bey of Tunis would eventually escape with his treasures in la Goulette, where Maltese ships were already waiting for him.

The Dutch consul was imprisoned after the Algerians found out that his nation had been providing Tunis with gunpowder, the consul M. Levet, would report that the Netherlands were trading the same merchandise to all the Barbary state, for over 150 years, But would regain his freedom with presents. In the same time the consul of Great Britain that promised his help with retaking Oran, corrupted the Dey against France, saying that the ships that the bey of Tunis escaped with were sent by France and not by the Maltese, the French consul also arrived in Algiers and denied the lies of the English consul. After his journey in Marseille, the dey demanded that the ships that were captured by the Bailli de Fleury were returned, the discussion escalated and M. Lemaire was sent to the Bagne, but would gain his liberty by presents offered by another French consul in 1756.

in 1757, the Kabyles were still revolting, in July 12 they took Bordj-Boghni and Bordj-Bouïra in August, and also the ones near Tenes and in the Djurdjura revolted, their activities continued until the middle of 1758, until they were stopped by armies sent from Algiers, Medea and Constantine. Even Tlemcen who was enjoying complete independence for 20 years, under the Caïd Redjem El- Bedjaouï, was besieged and their leader strangled by Algiers. During that time, the events with Tunis and Algiers caught the attention of the Sublime Porte, who sent a Capidji to stop the severe policy of Baba Ali, at the end, Tunis wasn't paid by Algiers for war reparations, and the Dey concluded peace with the Netherlands and Austria, where the Dutch merchants were stuck in İzmir, in fear of passing over Algiers and being pillaged.

The dey would receive payments from both Great Britain, who donated 24 cannons and 2,000 bombs, and Venice who paid an amount of 40,000 sequins and an annual payment of 10,000.

In the two following years, the Plague hit Algiers who was already under an extraordinary drought, and in need of water, since the earthquake of 1755 damaged the underground water pipes of the city. A great revolt broke out, by the Christian slaves who were working on the city's fountains, and treated badly since the price for slaves became higher. The French consul M. Vallières would be the first victim of this long massacre, along with all the French inhabitants of the city, the Dey would also execute a large number of his own government members such as the Oukhil-el-Hardj and the Agha of the Spahis, and the entire family of the son of the old Tunisian bey, Sidi-Younes.

The relations with France became worse, as the reason why the Dey killed M. Vallières was by his own anger and a story with Algerian pirates and French sailors, similar to the Prépaud affair during Ben Bekir reign. The French kingdom sent the Bailli of Fleury again to Algiers, in mission to liberate the consul, and after 2 unsuccessful negotiations, the third time he was in front of Algiers, he was applauded and cheered, and the Dey paid for reparations of the incidents and even strangled his Khaznadar who suggested his arrest, and also beat to death members of the militia after making fun of M. Vallières. The French white pavillon was respected again, until the death of the Dey. Also the Treaty of 1689 was renew, adding seven new articles about when French ships and Algerian ships meet, the punition that the aggressors would face in case of an incident between them, and another article which guarantees the security of the French citizens in Algiers.

== Death ==
In the start of the year 1765, the brother of Baba Ali, the Agha of the Spahis, the Oukhil-el-Hardj and 40 Turks, were exiled to İzmir and their goods were confiscated. The Dey would survive another year, until he fell ill and locked himself in the Jenina, until he finally died on February 2, 1766.

== See also ==
- List of governors and rulers of the Regency of Algiers
