= Dar Hussein =

Palace in Tunis

Dar Hussein (Arabic: دارحسين), is an old palace in the medina of Tunis.

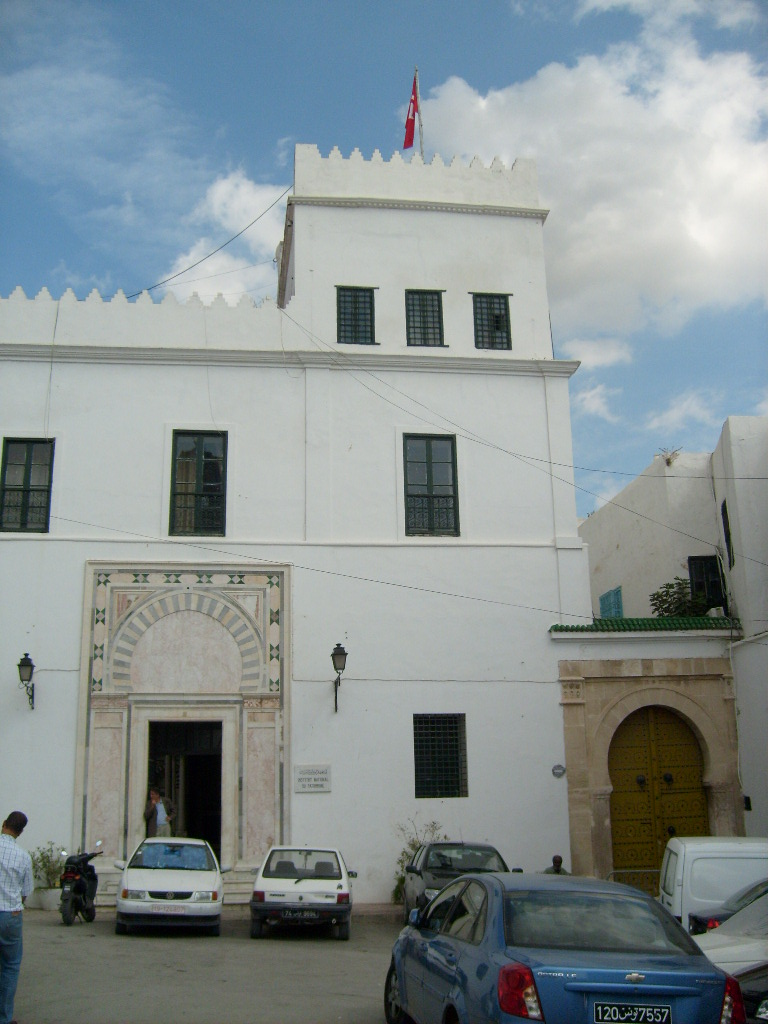
The castle's place and Dar Hussein

== Localization ==
It is located in 4 the castle's place in Bab Mnara district.

== History ==
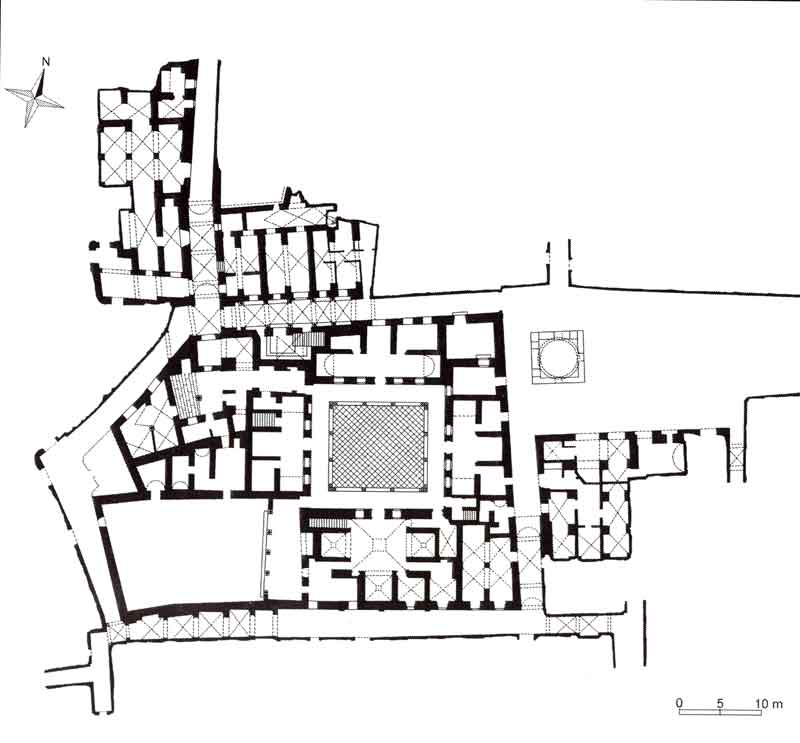
Scheme of the ground floor of Dar Hussein

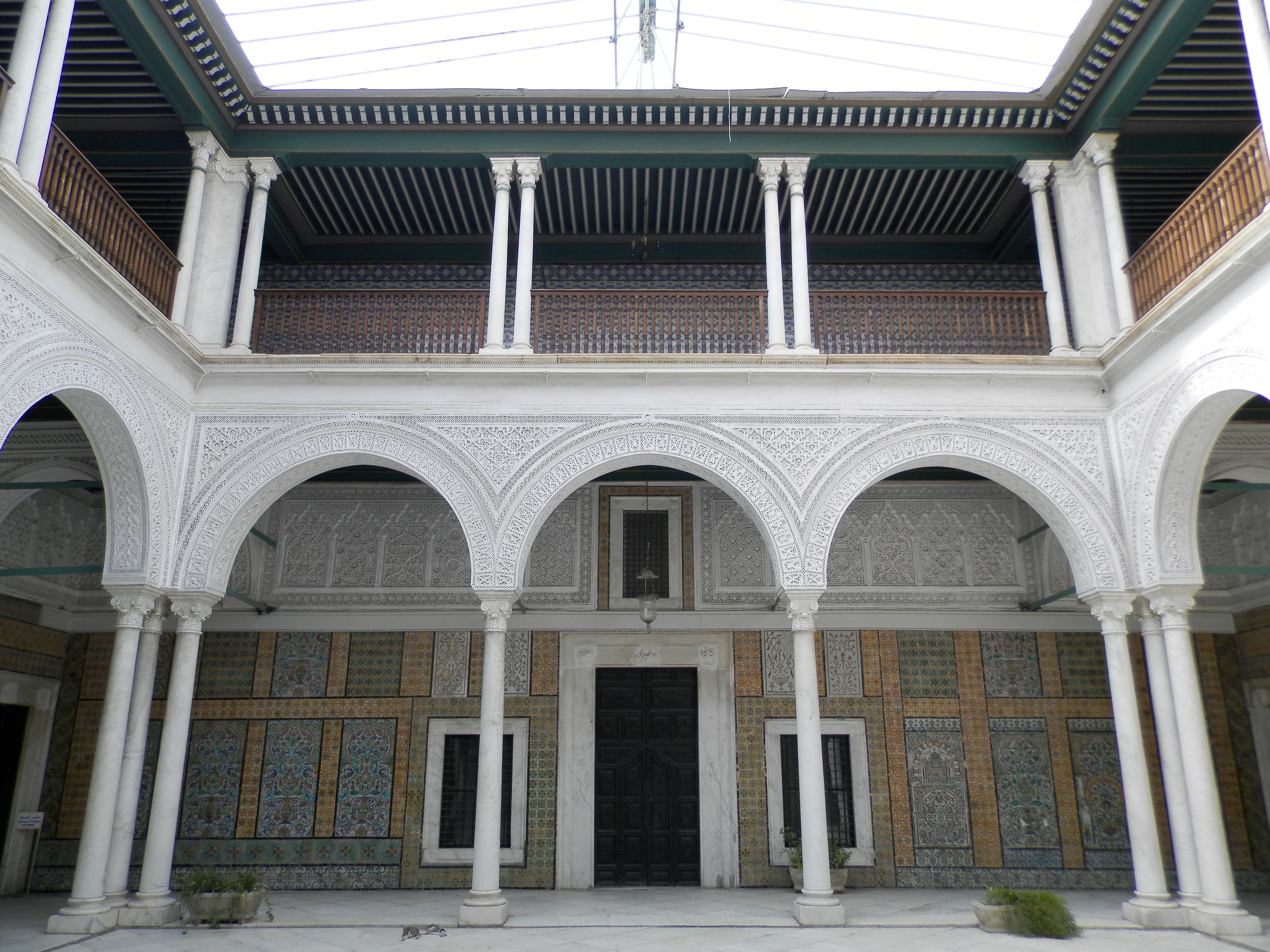
Balcony of the first floor

This palace was the house of many princes, deys and beys for centuries. Each one of them added his personal touch and extended it more.

The current decoration of the palace was Youssef Saheb Ettabaa’s choice.

In 1858, Dar Hussein became the first municipal council of Tunis and got the name of Dar El Achra (House of the ten) as it had 10 members.

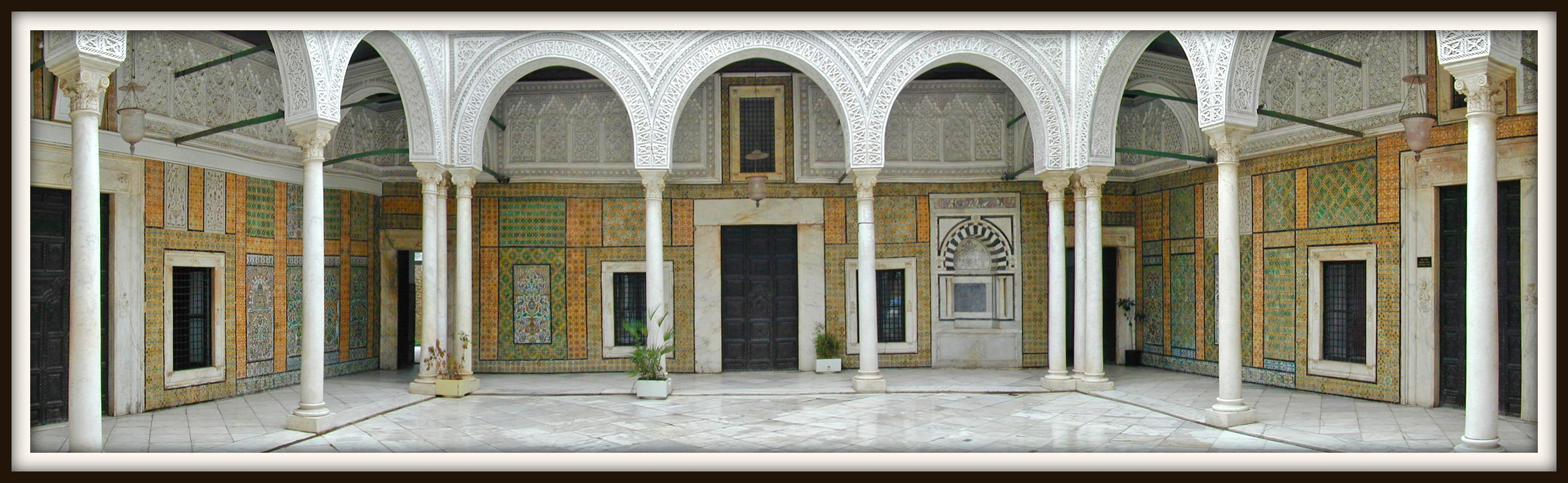
The main hall of the palace

In 1881, the French general Léonard-Léopold Forgemol de Bostquénard stayed in the Dar Hussein for the whole occupation period.

After 1957, became the main office for the National Institute of Heritage.

== Etymology ==
It got its name from its last owner, the General Hussein who was a very close friend to Hayreddin Pasha.

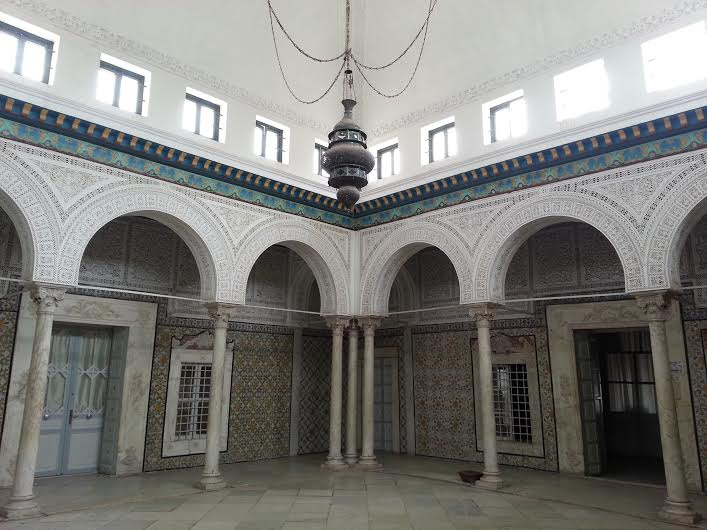
Room in Dar Hussein

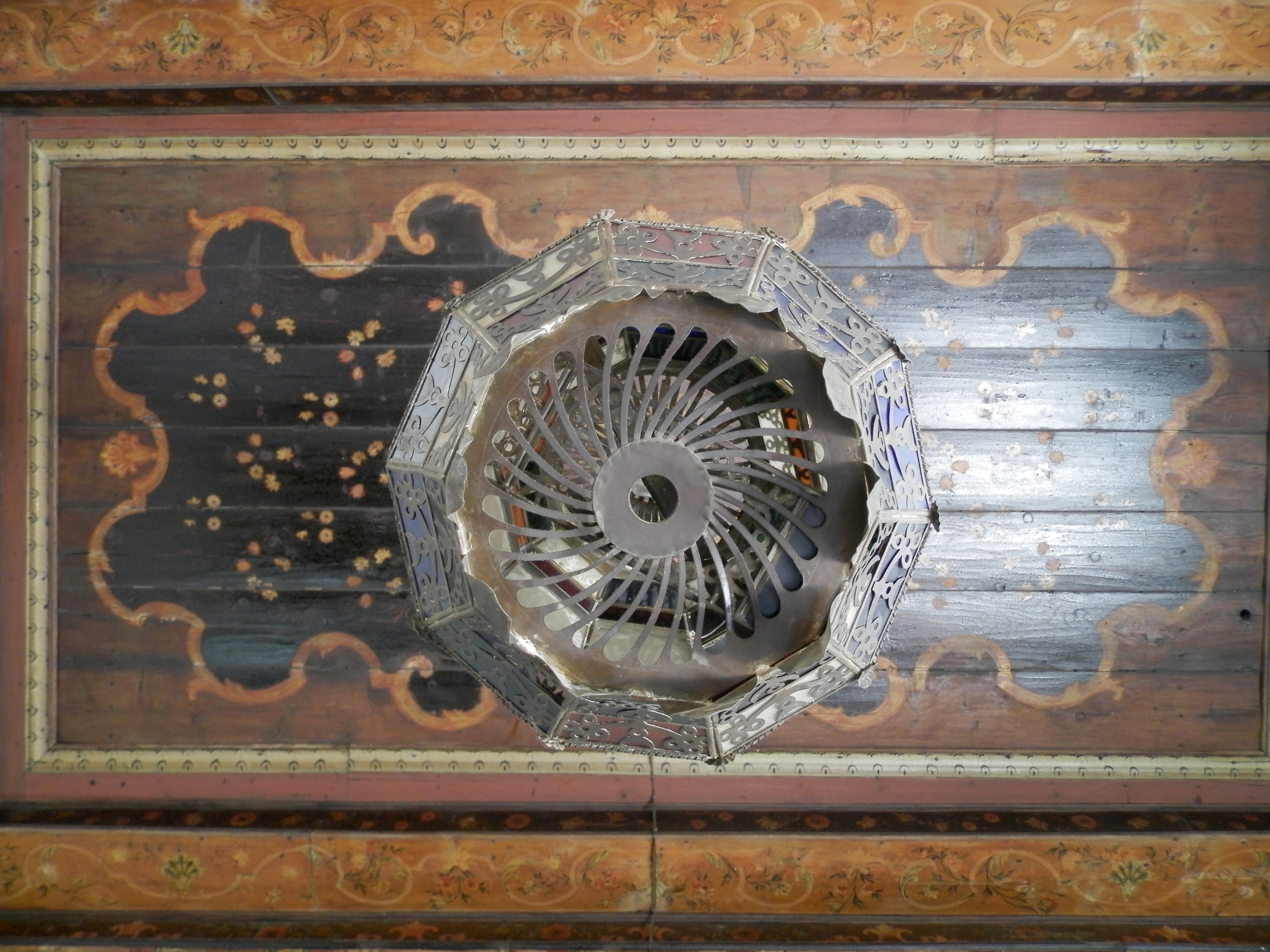
Rooftop of one of the rooms

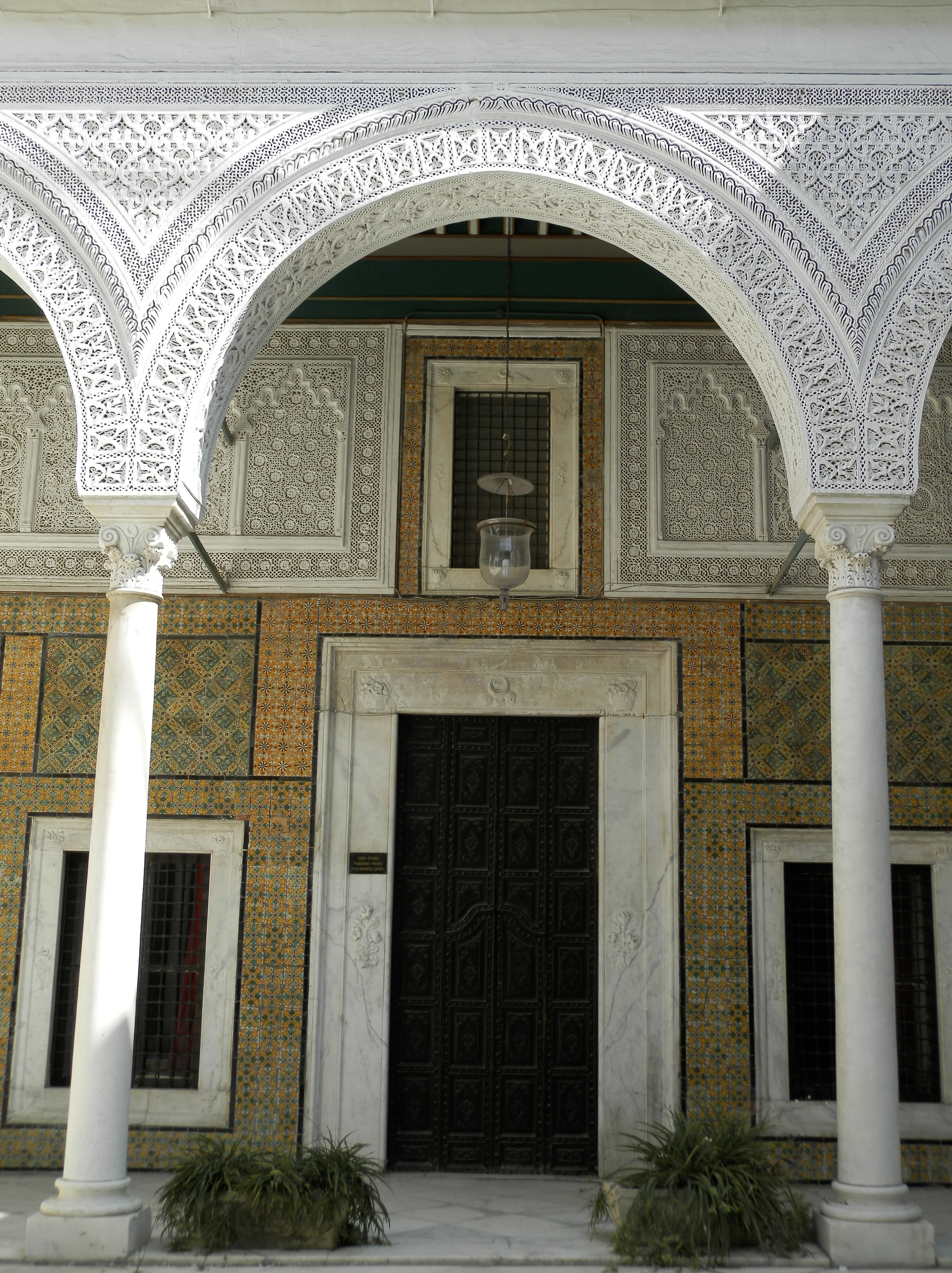
Porticos of the hall

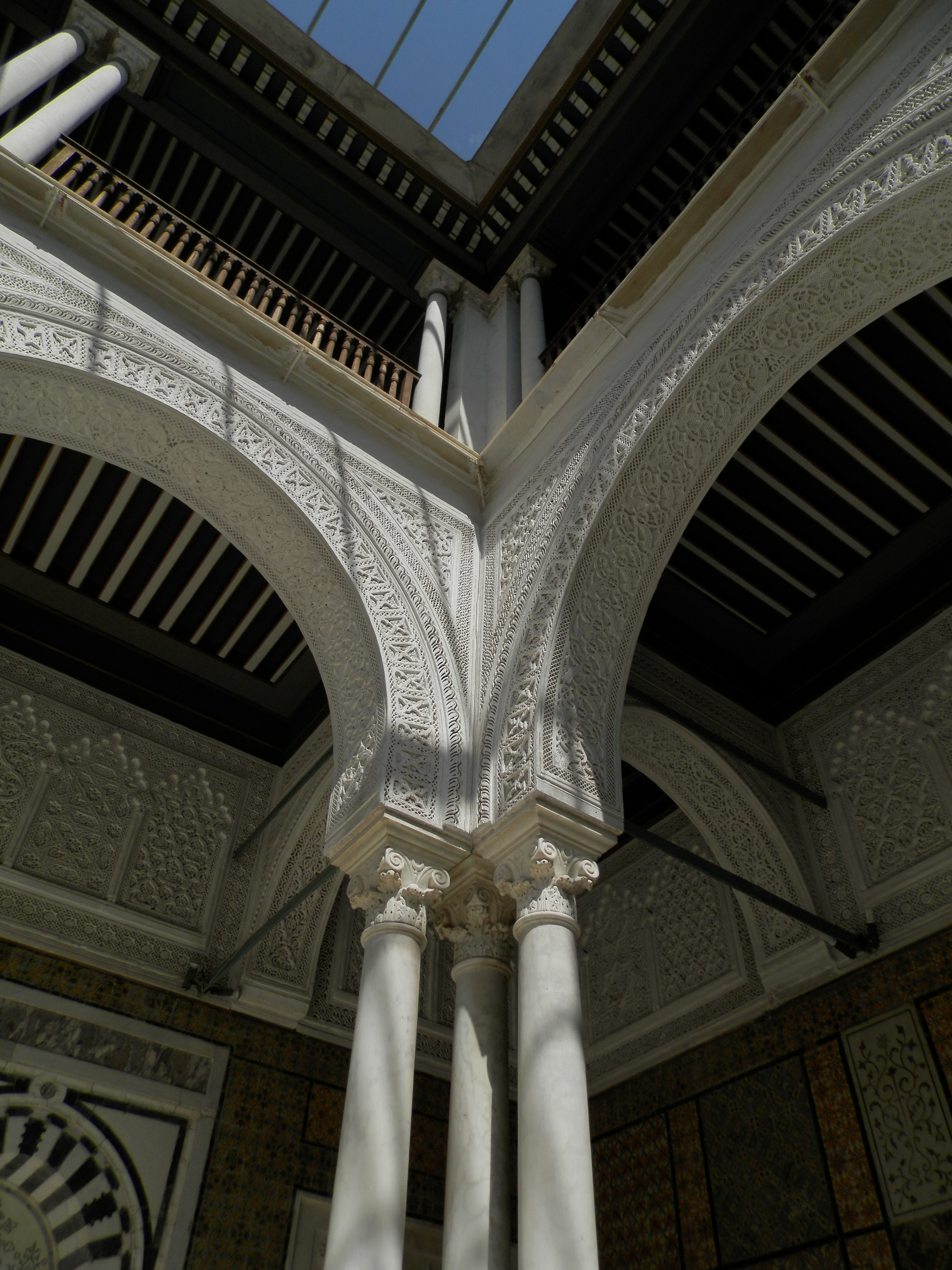
Columns of the hall

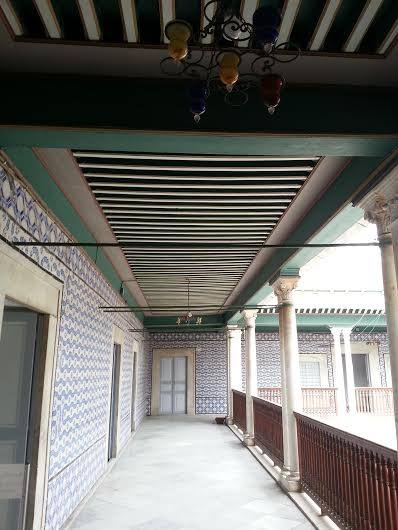
Balcony of the hall

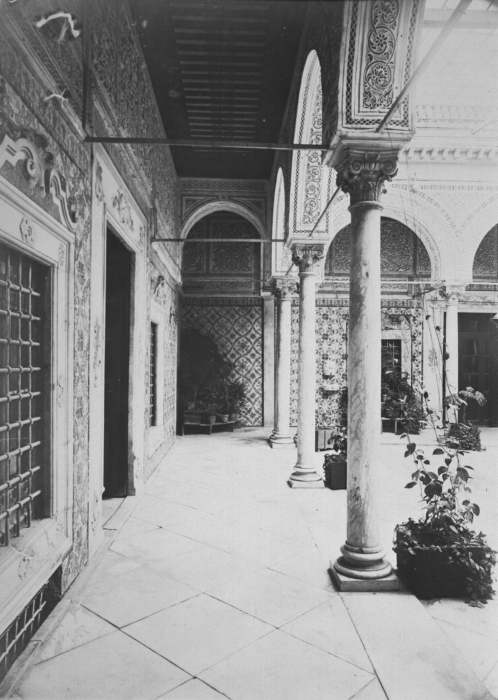
Dar Hussein in the 20th century
