= Dely Ibrahim Dey =

- Dey of Algiers
- Seal of Dely Ibrahim Dey

10th Dey of Algiers
- Reign: 22 March 1710 - 14 August 1710
- Predecessor: Mohamed Bektach
- Successor: Baba Ali Chaouch
- Died: 14 August 1710; Palace of the Jenina, Regency of Algiers
- Country: Regency of Algiers
- Religion: Islam
- Occupation: Janissary then Dey

Dely Ibrahim Dey (fl. 18th century) was the 10th ruler and Dey of Algiers. He ruled five months after his predecessor Mohamed Bektach.

== Rule ==
After a delay of payment, the janissaries revolted against the Dey Bektach and killed him along with his brother-in-law. His murderer would be elected and would leave Algiers in chaos, as he was described a "bloodthirsty brute."

His reign would eventually end after he was caught raping the wife of an absent janissary, as he got shot twice by a slave but would manage to make it to the Jenina, barricading himself in one of the rooms trying to defend himself, he would die in there after a grenade was thrown inside from one of the upper balconies.

== See also ==
- List of governors and rulers of the Regency of Algiers
