= Mohamed Bektach =

- Dey of Algiers

9th Dey of Algiers
- Reign: 4 March 1707 – 22 March 1710
- Predecessor: Hussein Khodja Dey
- Successor: Dely Ibrahim Dey
- Died: 22 March 1710; Algiers, Regency of Algiers
- Country: Regency of Algiers
- Religion: Islam
- Occupation: Janissary then Dey
- Military career
- Conflicts: Siege of Oran (1707–1708)

Mohamed Bektach was the 9th ruler and Dey of Algiers. He ruled three years after his predecessor Hussein Khodja Dey.

== Rule ==
=== Early career ===
After the deposit of Hussein khodja Dey after late payment. Who was boarding for Bougie, 4 Turks that he banned one year before the events as conspirators, were enough to begin a revolution. One of them, the Janissary Mohamed Bektach who succeeded him exiled Hussein and along with his nephew and Hazinedar to Dellys who would die there of an Anthrax.

=== Siege of Oran ===
Only a few months after his election, the Dey sent an army led by his Brother-in-Law, Ouzoun Hassan, to retake the city of Oran. After the success of the Algerians, Hassan placed the Bey of Mascara Mustapha Bouchelaghem as governor of Oran, and returning victoriously to Algiers with 2,000 Christian captives, among them 200 officers and an important amount of French and Maltese voluntarys. And was celebrated in honor of Hassan, as he also sent to the Sultan of Constantinople.

=== Death ===
Despite the privilege he had after the reconquest of Oran, and the besiege that the janissaries did to the poor city, the financial crisis that Algiers suffered would lead to the triggering of a revolt of the janissaries. Bektach and Hassan will be massacred and their murderer will be named as successor.

== See also ==
- List of governors and rulers of the Regency of Algiers
