= Hadj Chaouch =

Ruler of Algiers, c. 1698/1700

Hadj Hassen Chaouch
- Dey of Algiers
- Seal of Hadj Hassen Chaouch

6th Dey of Algiers
- Reign: c. 1699
- Predecessor: Hadj Ahmed
- Successor: Hadj Moustapha
- Died: 1705; Tripoli, Eyalet of Tripolitania
- Country: Regency of Algiers
- Religion: Islam
- Occupation: Dey

Hadj Hassen-Chaouch or Hadj Hassen-Chaouch was the 6th ruler and Dey of Algiers. He ruled for a few months between 1698 and 1700.

== Rule ==
He began his rule in 1698 after his predecessor Hadj Ahmed was murdered by Janissaries, Unlike Ahmed, Hassen he was considered as moderate and calm. He maintained the good relations with the kingdom of France established by Hadj Ahmed Chabane. French diplomat M. de Forbin wanted to ruin diplomatic relations between the two states. He rescued Christian slaves on a French ship called the Téméraire from Algiers. Even with two riots in the capital, Hassan calmed the situation with his goodwill.

When the Bey of Tunis Mourad III, Algerian Janissaries rose up against Hassan, forcing him to abdicate his title of Dey to the Divan of Algiers. The Divan decided that Agha Hadj Moustapha would take the title of Dey. After that he was sent to Tripoli where he probably died.

== See also ==
- List of governors and rulers of the Regency of Algiers
