= Battle of Majaz al-Bab (1705) =

- Part of Tunisian–Algerian War (1705)
| Date | 1705 |
| Location | Plane of Sedira, near Majaz al Bab |
| Result | Algerian victory |
| Territorial changes | Very minor, or no changes. |

Belligerents
| Beylik of Tunis | Regency of Algiers |

Commanders and leaders
| Al-Husayn I ibn Ali | Hadj Moustapha |

Strength
| Unknown | Unknown |

Casualties and losses
| 500 soldiers | Unknown |

The Battle of Majaz al-Bab (1705) was a Battle between the Regency of Algiers and the Regency of Tunis.

== Background ==
The governor of the Regency of Algiers was in severe economical crisis after the war of 1699, so the Dey of Algiers, Hadj Moustapha, decided to launch a campaign against Ottoman Tunisia. For this reason, he first captured the city of El Kef then besieged the city of Tunis. The Algerians finally abandoned the siege on Tunis after the promise of a ransom. The Algerian forces fled, leaving behind much equipment and many treasures.

== The battle ==
When Hussein ibn Ali, the bey of Tunis, saw the sudden huge Algerian army disappear in one night, a cavalry was sent by the Bey set out in pursuit for the Algerians, after taking the treasures and booty that the governor of Bône sent, among them old Arab auxiliaries of Moustapha who rushed behind them. They followed them all the way to the city of Majaz al-Bab in the plain Sedira where they met. The retreating Algerians suddenly turned for an offensive return who surprised the small cavalry, which made a mess among them, leaving the Tunisians with 500 soldiers less.
