= Battle of Moulouya =

1692 battle

Coordinates: 34°14′0″N 3°22′0″W

- Part of Conflicts between the Regency of Algiers and Morocco
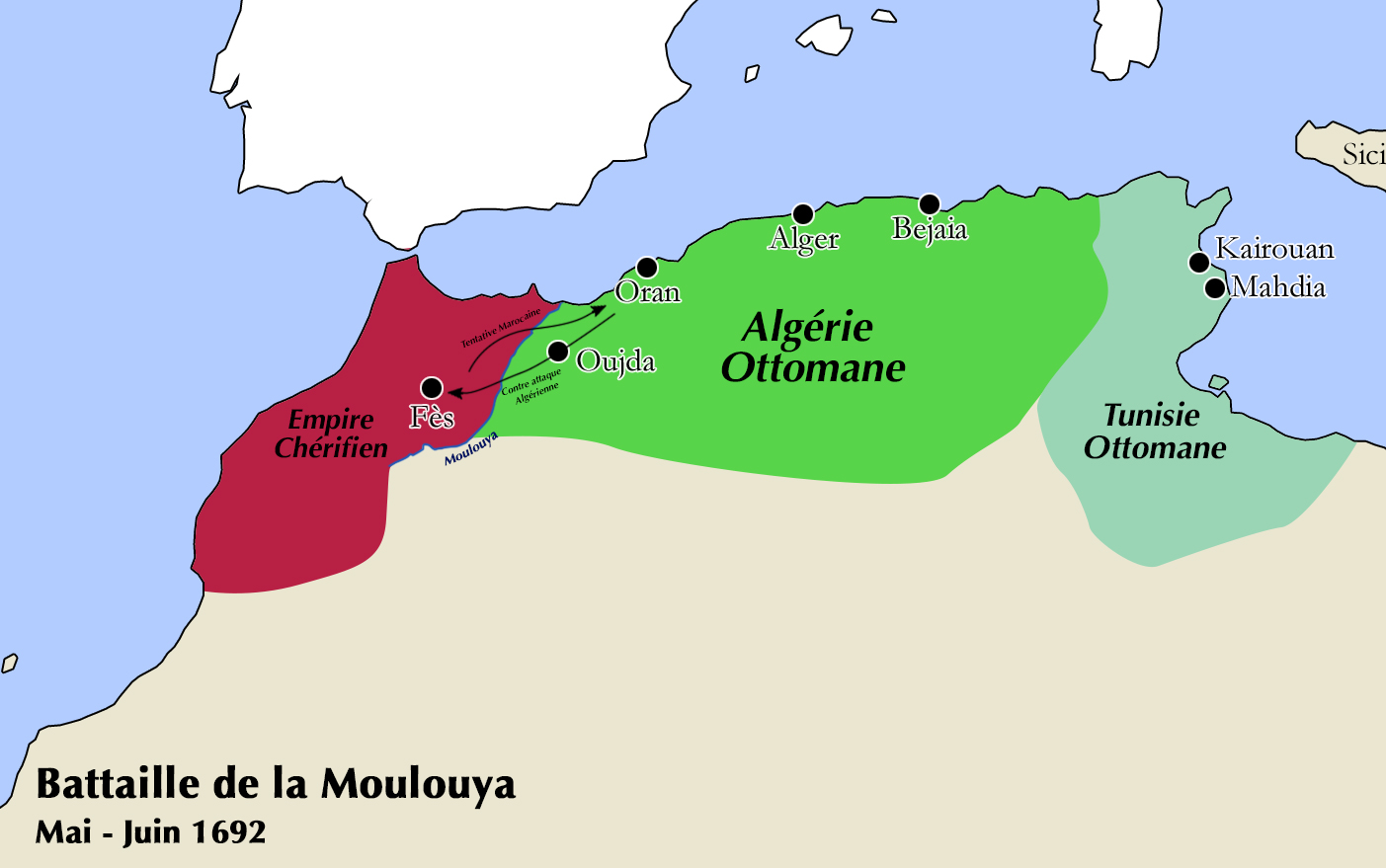
Date	May–June 1692
Location	Moulouya River
Result	Algerian victory
Territorial changes	The territory until the right bank of the Moulouya River experiences more than 100 years of Algerian rule

Belligerents
Regency of Algiers	(Morocco) Alawi Sultanate

Commanders and leaders
(Regency of Algiers) Hadj Ahmed Chabane	Ismail Ibn Sharif

Strength
10,000 Janissaries; 3,000 Spahis; 1 contingent of Igawawen Kabyles Or 12,000	14,000 Infantrymen; 8,000 Horses Or 60,000

Casualties and losses
~100 men	5,000 men
- Location of the Battle of Moulouya

The Battle of Moulouya took place in May 1692 at a ford on the Moulouya river in Morocco. It was fought between the armies of the Alawi sultan Moulay Ismail and those of the Dey of Algiers Hadj Chabane.

== Background ==
Hadj Chabane had just been elected Dey by the Taifa of the Raïs. He decided to declare war on the Sultan of Morocco as a result of continued efforts to ravage his territory. The borders between Ottoman Algeria and Morocco was first fixed at the Moulouya upon the Tlemcen War in 1551. This was the fixed border until the city of Oujda was temporarily conquered by the Alawi sultan Sidi Mohammed in 1647. A peace treaty between the two parties then delimited the border below the Tafna (upstream of Moulouya river).

Moulay Ismail had led expeditions in Algeria twice in his early reign, he was defeated on both occasions, in 1672 at Tlemcen and 1678 at Oued Za. The Moroccan incursions to the east of the Moulouya upstream, then Algerian territory, prompted Hadj Chabane to declare war on Sultan Moulay Ismail.

Moulay Ismaïl learned of his arrival to Oujda and attempted to retrace his steps, however the Algerian army reached him at a ford of the Moulouïa which lead to clashes with the Algerians. These tensions at the Algerian border occurred because Moulay Ismail wanted to have his "religious equality" with the Sultan of Istanbul recognized in the eyes of the Europeans. The alliance of France and the Ottomans intrigued him as he believed it could be an opportunity to counter Spain; or in case of war against the Algerians, an opportunity to bring an agreement between the Sultan of Istanbul and Fez. Mouley Ismail even proposed making an alliance with the bey of Tunis.

== Battle ==
The dey marched against Mouley Ismail with 10,000 Janissaries and 3,000 spahis, as well as a contingent of Igawawen Kabyles. The Algerians encountered the enemy, composed of 14,000 infantrymen and 8,000 cavalrymen. Despite the numerical inferiority, they vigorously attacked the Moroccans and killed 5,000 of their men while the Algerians suffered casualties of only a hundred.

Léon Galibert gives the following account:

It was to the king of Morocco, who sometimes came to ravage his territory, that the new dey Chaaban declared war: he went to the western border with 10,000 janissaries and 3,000 spahis. There the Algerians met the enemy army, which was 14,000 infantrymen and 8,000 horses; despite the inferiority of their numbers, they attacked the Moroccans vigorously and killed 5,000 men; the Algerians lost only a hundred.

— Léon Galibert

== Aftermath ==
The dey pursued the fugitives to the wall of Fez, which was protected by an army of 24,000 foot soldiers and 20,000 horses. The Sultan of Morocco, Moulay Ismail commanded it in person, but was reluctant to engage in combat knowing the earlier victory that the Algerians had spread terror among his soldiers. Despite their numerical superiority they forced him to make peace proposals. The two commanders went to a tent erected between the two camps and a peace agreement was signed. Allegedly Moulay Ismail came to the conference with his hands bound in a sign of submission. Kissing the ground three times, he appealed to the protection of the padichah of Constantinople and then said to the Algerian Dey: "You are the knife and I am the flesh that you can cut".

Moulay Ismael and the Moroccan army, terrified by this hard failure, are forced to ask for peace by granting in a treaty the sovereignty of the regency of Algiers on the territories going up to Moulouya. Jean-Baptiste Estelle, the French consul in Salé from 1689 to 1698, commented on the defeat of Moulay Ismail, meanwhile a 1692 report from consul Baker highlighted that the French and English counterparts of Estelle in Algiers rejoiced in gleeful fellowship with the Algerians.

The continued Moroccan offensives against Algiers in 1693, 1694, 1696, 1700, 1701, 1703 and 1707 ended in defeat. The territory until the Moulouya river remained under Algiers for more than 100 years.
