= Maruf =

Maruf may refer to:

== Names ==
- Ma'ruf, an Islamic Name which means "Well Known".

== People ==
=== Given name ===
- Ma'ruf Amin (born 1943), Indonesian politician
- Ma'ruf Balkhi, Persian poet
- Ma'ruf al-Karkhi, Sufi Muslim saint
- Maruf Khaznadar (1930–2010), Kurdish writer
- Maruf Mridha (born 2006), Bangladeshi cricketer
- Maruf al Rusafi (1875–1945), an Iraqi poet.
- Maruf Hossain Ibn Saeed, a Bangladeshi art director
- Maruf the Cobbler, a character in One Thousand and One Nights or The Arabian Nights

=== Surname ===
- Kazi Maruf (born 1983), is a Bangladeshi film actor

== Locations ==
- Maruf, Korgun, a village in Turkey.
- Maruf District, a district in Afghanistan.

== Others ==
- Maroof (horse) (1990–1999), a racehorse.
