= French Expedition to Béjaia (1831) =

French expedition to Béjaia
- Part of French conquest of Algeria
Date	1831
Location	Béjaia, Algeria
Result	Algerian victory

Belligerents
Tribe of Mézzaïa	France

Commanders and leaders
Caïd Mourad	

Strength
Unknown	Unknown

Casualties and losses
Unknown	Unknown

The French expedition to Béjaia was a battle launched by France to capture the city of Béjaia from the tribes of Mézzaïa.

== Background ==
Béjaia faced persistent conflicts with the French until it ultimately fell under their control. Following the overthrow of the Dey, the tribes of Mézzaïa assumed command over the city. An intriguing historical turn unfolded in 1831 when they were met with a minor French expedition launched against their dominion.

== Expedition ==
A certain Caïd Mourad, who was the tribe leader defended the city from the French, with them having an unknown commander leading them, aimed at imposing the leadership of Caïd Mourad, this attempt was met with failure, underscoring the tribe's resilience and determination to resist external impositions, and defend the city.

== Aftermath ==
In 1833, a renewed expedition culminated in the capture of the city, despite the fierce resistance mounted by its inhabitants. Notably, the tenacity displayed by the local population during this relentless struggle left an indelible mark on the historical tapestry. Interestingly, the French, though successful in seizing the city, faced challenges in extending their conquest to the surrounding areas.

In November 1835, the Kabyles launched an attack to reclaim the city but were defeated in their efforts. The ensuing battle spanned five days, predominantly characterized by close-quarters combat.
