= Hadj Ahmed (Dey) =

- Dey of Algiers
- Seal of Hadj Ahmed

5th Dey of Algiers
- Reign: 14 August 1695 – c. 1698
- Predecessor: Hadj Ahmed Chabane
- Successor: Hadj Chaouch
- Died: 1698; Palace of the Jenina, Regency of Algiers
- Country: Regency of Algiers
- Religion: Islam
- Occupation: Janissary then Dey

Hadj Ahmed or Hadj Ahmed ben Hadj Massli was the 5th ruler and Dey of Algiers. He ruled two years after his predecessor Hadj Ahmed Chabane.

== Rule ==
=== Biography ===
After the death of the dey Ahmed Chabane, the Divan of Algiers named multiple pretenders but they were killed the same day by the Janissaries who couldn't agree who should be the dey. On August 6, the Janissaries were wandering in the streets and they found Hadj Ahmed in front of his house sewing slippers. They took the old pirate and placed him on the throne, as he was cheered by the divan.

Hadj Ahmed accepted the conditions imposed by the constitution of 1672, and ruled Algiers with an iron fist as he spread fear around the capital. The letters of the French diplomats M. Laurence and M. Lemaire depict him as capricious, insecure and prone to such strange behavior similar to complete madness. He was so insecure, in fact, he filled the capital with spies, and he was paranoid even of the idea of going out of the Jenina palace[fr] to go pray at the mosque. As M. Laurence wrote,

I saw the reign of Trik, Baba-Hassan, Mezzomorto, Chaban, but none of them did what the Dey of today did: they all had some good qualities, instead of today's having none.... — M. Laurence.

== Death ==
He died at the Palace of Jenina in 1698, of the plague that took the lives of 25,000–45,000 others.

== See also ==
- List of governors and rulers of the Regency of Algiers
