= Tunisian–Algerian War (1705) =

Military conflict

Tunisian Algerian War (1705)
- Part of the Tunisian–Algerian Wars
| Date | 8 July 1705 – 9 October 1705 (3 months, 1 day) |
| Location | Tunisia |
| Result | See Aftermath |
| Territorial changes | Very minor, or no changes. |

Belligerents
| Regency of Algiers | Beylik of Tunis |

Commanders and leaders
| Hadj Moustapha: Various Tunisian arab tribes. | Ibrahim Sharif X Al-Husayn I ibn Ali |

Strength
| 40,000 soldiers | Unknown: (18,000 at Tunis) |

Casualties and losses
| Low | Heavy |

The Tunisian–Algerian War of 1705 was a military conflict between the Beylik of Tunis and the Regency of Algiers. The Regency wanted to cripple Tunis' power due to their participation in the Maghrebi War.

== Background ==
During the Maghrebi war, the Regency suffered brutal campaigns from the east and west by the Moroccan and Tunisian alliance. The Dey (ruler) of the Regency, Hadj Hassen-Chaouch, was in charge during the war and was helped by his Agha (chief) Hadj Moustapha. Chaouch's first battles were in the Western Beylik during the Mascara Campaign when Moulay Ismail's Moroccan army pillaged western cities of the Western Beylik. In 1701, Moustapha helped his vassal Ali Khodja Bey in Constantine; Bey died trying to defend Constantine from the army of Ibrahim el Sharif. Moustapha then met the Tunisians near Setif and won the Battle of Jouami' al-Ulama with few casualties. The war ended with the assassination of Murad III and his family by Ibrahim el Sharif, who had more specific plans after his return from Istanbul.

== The war ==
After the Maghrebi war, Hadj Hassen-Chaouch resigned and appointed Hadj Moustapha as Dey for his wartime victories. However, the Regency lacked money due to the war, so the Dey raised taxes in a vain attempt to raise money for the crumbling state. The only feasible way to gain money was from the neighboring state of Tunis.

=== Battle of Kef ===
The Algerian army entered the Tunisian territory on 8 July and established their camps close to Kef in Oued el-Tin (probably Oued-Mellègue). When the Algerians had set up their camps, a Banu Hilal Arab tribe of Tunisia named Ouled Saïd allied with the Algerians. This led to other Arab tribes following the Ouled Saîd, including the powerful Drid, who had betrayed Tunisia several times. A part of Ibrahim's regular troops changed sides. Dey Moustapha proceeded to send officers to Ibrahim requesting peace offerings, such as demanding Tunisia pay a tribute for war reparations, send a delivery of 1,000 camels, and hand over one of Ibrahim's children to the Dey as a hostage.

Ibrahim took this as a provocation and entered Kef with his Agha Al-Husayn I ibn Ali. Despite Ibrahim's battlefield advantage, the Algerians took control and surrounded the city, leaving the Tunisians trapped. Ibrahim eventually surrendered and was imprisoned and sent to Algiers. After this, the remaining Tunisian troops retreated to Tunis with their Agha. The most influential, Al-Husayn I ibn Ali, proclaimed himself Dey and founded the Husainid dynasty on 10 July 1705, ending the Muradid War of Succession.

=== Siege of Tunis ===
The Algerian army arrived in front of Tunis and took position in Ben-Medjous with an army of 40,000 soldiers, including 10,000 rebels, and besieged the city. The 18,000 Tunisians, fearing pillage of their city, resisted and protested against Dey Moustapha, causing Husayn to pay him a ransom of 150,000 piastres to lift the siege. The Dey noted food and ammunition supplies were dwindling and winter was approaching, so he abandoned the siege and returned to Algiers.

=== Battle of Majaz al-Bab ===
After the Algerians left Tunis on the night of 7 or 9 October, Bey Husayn sent a small cavalry to chase the Dey's army. They followed the Algerians to a small plain near the city of Majaz al Bab named Sedira, when Moustapha realised they were being followed. The Algerians launched an offensive on the cavalry that caught the Tunisians off guard, resulting in 500 Tunisian losses.

== Aftermath ==
Moustapha left Tunis on 6 October 1705 and was harassed by Kabyles and Tunisians on his way to Algiers. After returning to Algiers, he received his payment from Husayn.

After assassination of the Hadj Moustapha, several people fought for the title of Dey, and Algiers fell into chaos. Two people rose to compete for the title. The first was a representative of Ahmed III, an Ottoman Sultan, and the other one was described as the chosen one of the Algerians. After five years of political and economic instability, Baba Ali Chaouch became Dey and restored stability to the republic.
