= List of governors and rulers of the Regency of Algiers =

This is a list of the Beylerbeys, Pashas and Deys of the Regency of Algiers:

== Beylerbeys of the Regency of Algiers (1517–1588) ==
No.	Portrait	Name	Date of rule		Other titles	Notes, faits marquants
1		Oruç Barbarossa	1517	1518	Baba Aruj	The first Beylerbey of Algiers. In 1516 he and his brothers succeeded in liberating Jijel and Algiers from the Spaniards. Aruj Barbarossa made conquests in the eastern lands of Morocco, in 1518 he conquered and garrisoned Oujda and Tibda.
2		Hayreddin Barbarossa	1518	1545	Barbarossa	Following Oruç's death in 1518, Khizr inherited his brother's nickname, "Barbarossa". In 1533, Barbarossa was appointed Kapudan Pasha (grand admiral) of the Ottoman Navy. He conquered Tunis in 1534, achieved a decisive victory over the Holy League at Preveza in 1538, and conducted joint campaigns with the French in the 1540s.
3		Hasan Pasha (son of Barbarossa)	1545	1566	Pasha	In 1567, he was named, Kapudan pasha or Commander-in-Chief, of the Ottoman Navy, like his father before him. Hasan Pasha was at the Great Siege of Malta in 1565, and Battle of Lepanto in 1571. He died in Constantinople in 1572.
4		Muhammad I Pasha	1566	1568	Pasha	He was the son of the famous Pasha of Algiers Salah Rais. He was active in extending Algiers and building several forts.
5		Occhiali	1568	1577	Kılıç Ali Pasha	He became beylerbey of the Regency of Algiers, and finally Grand Admiral (Kapudan Pasha) of the Ottoman fleet in the 16th century. In 1576 he raided Calabria and in 1578 put down another mutiny of the janissaries in Algiers who had assassinated Arab Ahmed. In 1585 he put down revolts in Syria and Lebanon.
6		Hassan Veneziano	1577	1588		A Venetian slave, he served Uludj Ali, when he was governor of Algiers and Capitan Pasha in Constantinople. He later was appointed by him to head of the Regency of Algiers.

== Pashas (1588–1659) ==
- Dely Ahmed 1588–1589
- Hızır Pasha 1589–1591
- Hadji Shaban Pasha 1591–1593
- Mustapha Pasha 1593–1594
- Kader Pasha (second time) 1594–1595
- Mustapha II Pasha 1596–1599
- Daly Hassan Pasha 1599–1601
- Somiman Pasha 1601–1603
- Muhammad II the eunuch 1605–1607
- Mustapha III Pasha 1607
- Redwan Pasha 1607–1610
- Kussa Mustapha 1610–1614
- Hasan IV 1614–1616
- Mustapha IV Pasha 1616–1619
- Kassan Kaid Kussa 1619–1621
- Kader Pasha 1621–1626
- Hassan Khodja 1626–1634
- Yusuf II 1634–1645
- Mahmud Brusali Pasha 1645–1647
- Yusef Pasha 1647–1650
- Mehmed Pasha 1650–1653
- Ahmed Pasha (first period of rule) 1653–1655
- Ibrahim Pasha (first period) 1655–1656
- Ahmed Pasha (second period) 1656–1657
- Ibrahim Pasha (second period) 1657–1659
- Ahmed Pasha (third period) 1658–1659

== Aghas (1659–1671) ==
- Khalil Agha 1659–1660
- Ramadan Agha 1660–1661
- Chabane Agha 1661–1665
- Ali Agha 1665–1671

== Deys of the Deylik of Algiers (1671–1848) ==
No.	Portrait	Name	Date of rule		Other titles	Notes, faits marquants
1		Mohamed Trik	1671	1682	Doulateli	The first dey of Algiers. He reduced Ottoman authority to a ceremonial role, and ousted the Janissary aghas with the help of the Raises.
2		Baba Hassan	1682	1683	Doulateli	He kept the independence of Algiers under his rule. He declared war on the Kingdom of France, provoking the Djidjelli expedition, and the first and second bombardments of Algiers. He was forced to accept a peace treaty imposed by the Ottomans, which also replaced him with Mezzo Morto Hüseyin Pasha.
3		Mezzo Morto Hüseyin Pasha	1683	1688	Doulateli	After ousting Baba Hassan he declared war on France again. He was the one to fight off the aforementioned bombardments and expeditions. Unlike Trik or Hassan, he was only quasi-independent. In 1687 the Ottomans attempted to restore total control over Algeria by sending Ismael Pasha to disembark in Algiers, But Mezzomorto refused to let him. He was ousted in 1688 by a native revolt. He was appointed admiral of the Ottoman Empire after fleeing to Tunis.
4		Hadj Ahmed Chabane	1688	1695	Doulateli	He went to Versailles to improve relations with France. He successfully made Tunis an Algerian tributary, but he was strangled to death by the Janissary militia. He was instated by an anti-ottoman native revolt, so he may have been a native himself, but this is not specified.
5		Hadj Ahmed	1695	1698	Doulateli	Despite the fact that he wasn't elected by the Janissaries he catered to them heavily as to keep his power. He got murdered after a disagreement with the Janissaries.
6		Hadj Hassen Chaouch	1699	1700	Doulateli	He was forced to resign after a severe defeat in a war with Tunisia
7		Hadj Moustapha	1700	1705	Doulateli	He achieved a decisive victory over Tunisian forces near Skikda, and he stopped an offensive by Ismail Ibn Sharif near the Muluya river. He failed to capture Tunis in 1705, and retreated but was caught and killed by his janissaries near Collo.
8		Hussein Khodja	1705	1707	Doulateli	His reign is marked with financial problems
9		Mohamed Bektach	1707	1710	Doulateli	Started his rule by achieving a first retaking of Oran in 1707, He was assassinated by the Janissaries due to payment delays.
10		Dely Ibrahim Dey	1710	1710	Doulateli	He was assassinated after only 5 months of ruling.
11		Baba Ali Chaouche	1710	1718	Doulateli Pasha	He eliminated more than a thousand Janissaries. He refused to accept the Pasha sent from the Sublime Porte, marking his independence. He also reformed the diwan, which from then on elected the Deys of Algiers.
12		Mohamed Ben Hassen	1718	1724	Doulateli Pasha	He encountered internal difficulties especially with the tribes and the corsairs. He continued his predecessor's policy on independence, refusing to accept Ottoman orders on external policy. He was killed by the corsairs, during a revolt of the latter, who accused him of favoring the janissaries.
13		Baba Abdi (also known as Curd Abdi)	1724	1732	Doulateli Pasha	He was a great defender of the interests of the corsairs and their activity. He maintained the firmness of his predecessors regarding the Ottoman Empire, refusing to let in the Pasha appointed by the Sublime Porte.
14		Baba Ibrahim Dey	1732	1745	Doulateli Pasha	He failed to retake Oran from the Spanish, but he also made Tunis a tributary.
15		Ibrahim Kouchouk	1745	1748	Doulateli Pasha	His reign was marked by multiple revolts
16		Mohamed Ibn Bekir	1748	1754	Doulateli Pasha	He also had to face multiple revolts. He issued an edict, limiting the power of the Janissaries (Ahad Aman)
17		Baba Ali Bou Sebâa	1754	1766	Doulateli Pasha	Thanks to the edict issued by his predecessor he had to face 2 revolts by the Janissaries, one near Tlemcen, while the other in Constantine.
18		Muhammad V ben Othman	1766	1791	Doulateli Pasha	He had a relatively long reign. He was competent, pious and austere, which manifested throughout his reign. He hunted the ships of nations which refused to pay tribute, He defeated Denmark in 1772, and Spain in 1785. He also faced several rebellion in the Constantine region, where he appointed an energetic governor called Salah Bey.
19		Sidi Hassan	1791	1798	Doulateli Pasha	He was the uncle of the last dey of Algiers Hussain Pasha, and held several ministerial positions before being elected Dey. He retook Oran from Spain in 1792. Ruler during the American-Algerian War.
20		Mustapha	1798	1805	Doulateli Pasha	He was the grandson of dey Muhammad ben Othman and was known for being close to Jewish merchants. Due to failed harvests, famine and political turmoil ensued. The Darqawa revolt sparked during his reign. He was killed by the Janissaries in 1805.
21		Ahmed bin Ali Khodja	1805	1808	Doulateli Pasha	
22		Ali III ben Mohamed	1808	1809	Doulateli Pasha	
23		Hadj Ali Dey	1809	1815	Doulateli Pasha	His rule was marked by authoritarianism and cruelty. The Bey of Oran revolted against him and marched until Miliana, but the Cheikhs in his army betrayed him, and as such he failed to overthrow Hadj Ali. The Bey of Titteri got decisively defeated by the tribes of the Sahara under his rule, and the Deylik failed to impose any control over the Sahara for the next few years. His rule was also marked by several revolts in Kabylia, the Tlemcen region, and the Aurès Mountains. He was assassinated while bathing.
24		Hadj Mohamed	1815	1815	Doulateli Pasha	He noticed the corruption of the Janissaries which thrived under his predecessor, and he tried to stop it, but he was assassinated instead.
25		Omar Agha	1815	1817	Doulateli Pasha	
26		Ali Khodja	1817	1818	Doulateli Pasha	
27		Hussein Dey	1818	1830	Doulateli Pasha	The last Dey of Algiers, his rule, and the Deylik of Algiers ended with the Invasion of Algiers in 1830.
Unofficial Deys after 1830
		Mustapha Boumezrag	1830	1830		Once the Bey of Titteri (governor of the southern provinces), following the fall of Algiers he declared himself the new Dey of Algiers and began a campaign of resistance against the French army, until his capital was captured and he was forced to capitulate during the Médéa expedition.
		Hadj Ahmed Bey	1833	1848		Once the Bey of Constantine, he fought the French starting in 1830, and declared himself Dey of Algeria in 1833. After defeating a large French attack in 1836, his capital was captured in 1837, after which he retreated into the Aures and the Sahara from where he waged guerilla warfare, until he surrendered in 1848.

== See also ==
- List of French governors of Algeria
- Ottoman Algeria
- Turks in Algeria
- Ottoman Empire

== Sources ==
- Kaddache, Mahfoud (2011). L'Algérie des Algériens. ISBN 978-9961-9662-1-1.
