= Baba Mohammed ben-Osman =

Dey of Algiers from 1766 to 1791

Muhammad V
- Dey of Algiers
- Seal Muhammad V

18th Dey of Algiers
- Reign: 1766 – 1791
- Predecessor: Baba Ali Bou Sebaa
- Successor: Sidi Hassan
- Born: 1710; Karamania, Anatolia
- Died: 12 July 1791 (aged 80–81); Algiers, Regency of Algiers
- Issue: Sidi Hassan (Adopted son, nephew); Brahim ben Mohammed (Son); Mustapha ben Brahim (Grandson)
Names
- Baba Mohammed ben-Osman
- Country: Regency of Algiers
- Religion: Islam
- Occupation: Dey
- Military career
- Conflicts: Spanish–Algerian war (1775–1785); Danish–Algerian War; Algerian-American War (1785-1795)

Baba Mohammed ben-Osman or Muhammad V ben Osman was Dey of the Deylik of Algiers from 1766 to 1791 and the adoptive father of Baba Hassan Pacha and the grandfather of Mustapha Pacha. He declared war against Denmark–Norway because Denmark-Norway refused his demands for an increased annual payment to stave off piracy, and new gifts, which began the Danish-Algerian War. He also declared war against the United States in 1785 and captured several American ships. The war ended in 1795 when the U.S concluded a treaty with his successor that paid $21,600 annually to Algiers.

== Early life ==
He was of Turkish origin. Not much is known about his early life. According to a French source, he was born, and was raised in a village in Karamania, where he was recruited into the Odjak of Algiers.

== Administration ==
Having learned to read and write, he became a khodja (secretary) after having bought his state office for the sum of 1000 pieces. He practiced with various garrisons before being promoted to the personal guard of the dey's palace Then he became Khaznadji (Prime Minister and Treasurer) of Dey Baba Ali who then designated him as his successor.

== Restoration of the prestige of Algiers outside ==
He succeeded Dey Baba Ali in 1766. Spain tried to establish peace with the Regency, but these negotiations resulted only in an exchange of captives between November 1768 and February 1769. Mohamed Ben Osman declared war on Denmark-Norway in 1770 and repulsed a Danish attack on Algiers in 1772, and notably imposed on United Kingdom, the United States and the Kingdom of the Two Sicilies a system of maritime tribute. However, following this period of calm, the Algerian corsair activities intensified and caused distress on the southern shores of Spain and partially disrupted its maritime traffic. The Spanish were therefore trying the Limpieza del Mar operation to try to end this corsair presence in the Western Mediterranean, without success. In 1775, Alejandro O'Reilly was sent to the head of an armada to take Algiers. Dey Mohamed Ben Othmane inflicted a heavy defeat in the vicinity of El Harrach. In 1776, he appointed as Wakil al Kharadj (Minister for Foreign Affairs), Sidi Hassan who with his counterpart Floridablanca opened a period of rapprochement between the governments of Algiers and Madrid.

However peace with Spain was not to the advantage of the dey; piracy earned it a lot of income and asking for the release of a captive might even be perceived in Algiers as a humiliation. With the diplomacy over, he found a pretext for the lack of peace between the Ottoman Empire and Spain, and invited the latter to make peace with the Empire before negotiating with himself to save time and avoid asking for peace in Spain. In fact, the Ottoman Sultan categorically refused to interfere in the affairs of the regencies, which he "considered as independent states". The Spaniards finally got a firman (a recommendation) to the Regencies of North Africa, that the dey Mohamed Ben Othmane had already planned to reject. Indeed, apart from the spiritual connection (the Ottoman sultan was considered caliph and possessor of the holy places of Islam), at the time of Mohamed Ben Othmane, the Regency managed its internal and external affairs independently.

But King Charles III of Spain decided to declare war again. He sent squads to bomb Algiers between 1783 and 1784. Having found that the Sublime Porte had no authority over Algiers, the Madrid cabinet sought a direct way to negotiate peace. The negotiations were difficult, but on June 16, 1785, a peace agreement was concluded. Dey Mohamed Ben Othmane demanded in the peace talks a compensation of 1,000,000 pesos for the various expeditions. The members of the diwân of Algiers (assembly) also obtained the attribution of the present diplomats.

== Domestic policy ==
On a national level, his reign, the longest of all the deys, was marked by stability. In the management of the affairs he manifested a great sense of the state. He was busy recovering Oran and Mers el Kebir under Spanish tutelage. He appointed an energetic Bey in the west, Mohamed el Kebir, whom he instructed to take these two places. He also carried out successful campaigns to pacify the hinterland. He was also able to face the rise of Constantinois where he named another illustrious Bey Salah Bey ben Mostefa in 1771. He died on July 12, 1791, and was replaced by his Khaznadji (Prime Minister) and his adopted son Sidi Hassan.

== See also ==
- List of governors and rulers of the Regency of Algiers

== Bibliography ==
- Kaddache, Mahfoud (2011) [1982]. Société nationale d'édition et de diffusion (ed.). L'Algérie des Algériens (in French) (EDIF2000 ed.). Algiers. ISBN 978-9961-9662-1-1.
