= Naphtali Busnash =

Assassinated Algerian jew (died 1805)

Naphtali Busnash was Chief of the Algerian Jews and statesman; born in Algiers in the middle of the eighteenth century; assassinated June 28, 1805.

He was engaged — first alone, and later with the firm Bakri Brothers — in the grain trade, of which the Dey Ḥasan, with whom Busnash was on friendly terms, granted him a monopoly. The firm of Bakri & Busnash soon attained a wide reputation, and Busnash became (according to some) the most influential man in Algeria. In 1800 he was appointed by the dey Mustapha—whom he had helped to attain to power—chief of the Algerian Jews, a post to which was attached the office of broker to the dey, and the consul-generalship of Ragusa. In this position Busnash displayed so much ability that he won the entire confidence of the dey, who practically left the government in his hands. It was he who received the consuls and settled differences between Algeria and foreign countries. His power did not, however, last. The janissaries and Muslim extremists reluctantly submitted to the domination of a Jew; but Busnash, after having escaped several attempts on his life, was at last shot dead by a janissary at the gate of the dey's palace.
