= Hussein Khodja Dey =

Ruler of Algiers, 1706 to 1707

- Dey of Algiers
- Seal of Hussein Khodja Dey

8th Dey of Algiers
- Reign: 1706 - 4 March 1707
- Predecessor: Hadj Moustapha
- Successor: Mohamed Bektach
- Died: 4 March 1707; Dellys, Regency of Algiers
- Country: Regency of Algiers
- Religion: Islam
- Occupation: Dey

Hussein Khodja Dey or Hassan Khodja Dey was the 8th ruler and Dey of Algiers. He ruled one year after his predecessor Hadj Moustapha.

== Rule ==
After the death of his predecessor and his election, he executed Moustapha's wife and daughter and after using all his fortune to satisfy the militia, he would also manage to get a ransom of 150,000 piastres by the old Bey Ibrahim el-Sharif of Tunis. But as his fortune drained out, he would be unable to pay the Janissaries, and would be deposed the 4th March 1707.

== See also ==
- List of governors and rulers of the Regency of Algiers
