= Baba Ali Chaouch =

Ruler of Algiers (d. 1718)

- Dey
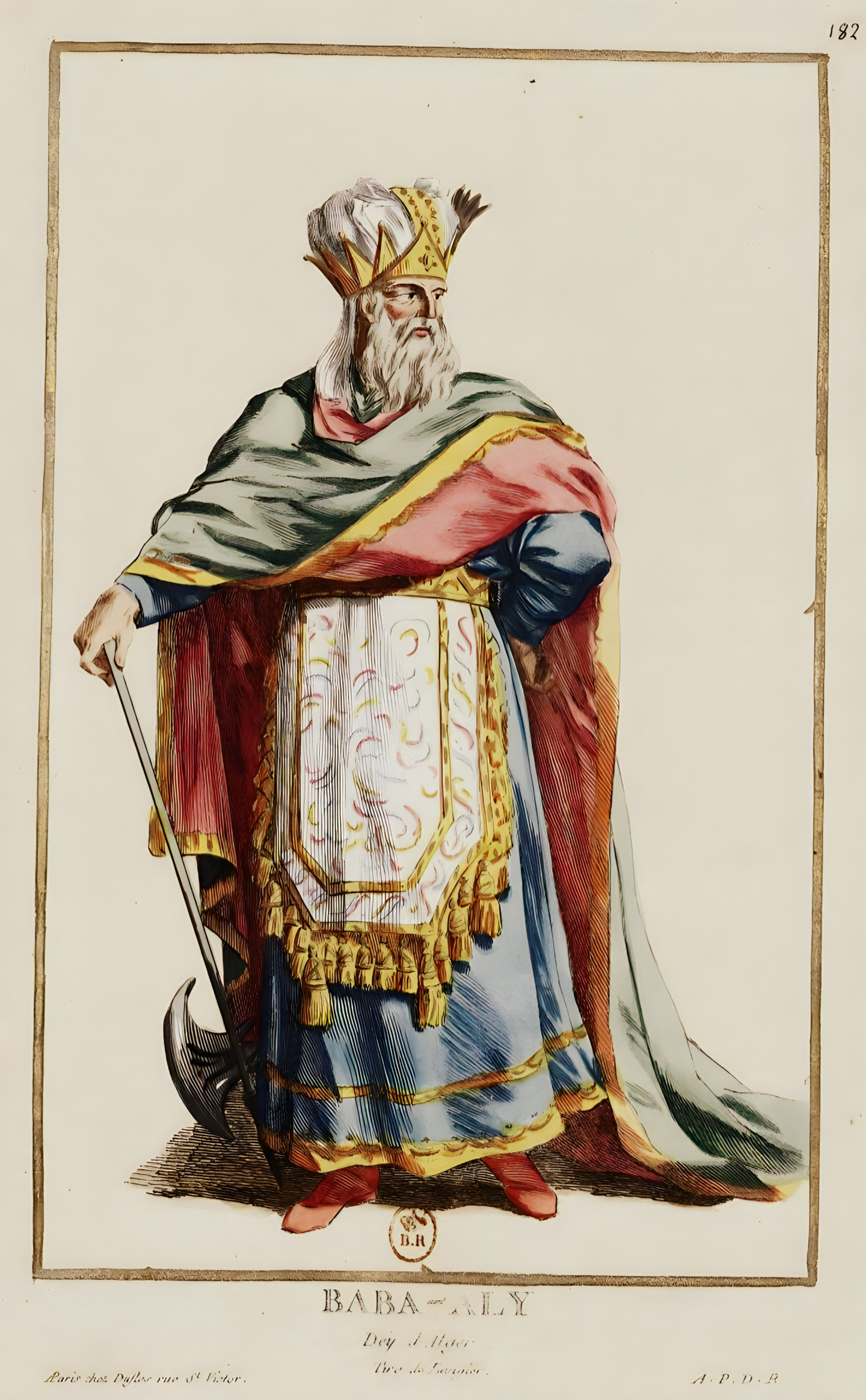
- Baba Ali Chaouche, by Pierre Duflos

11th Dey of Algiers
- Reign: 15 August 1710 – 4 April 1718
- Predecessor: Dely Ibrahim Dey
- Successor: Mohamed Ben Hassan
- Born: Algiers
- Died: 4 April 1718; Algiers, Regency of Algiers
Regnal name
- Ali I
- Arabic: بابا علي شاوش
- Country: Regency of Algiers
- Religion: Sunni Islam
- Occupation: Corsair
- Military career
- Conflicts: Dutch-Algerian War (1716-1726)

Baba Ali Chaouch, also known as Ali Soukali, or simply Ali I, was a ruler of the Deylik of Algiers from 1710 to 1718. He was the first dey of Algiers to be invested with the title of dey-pacha. The Sultan Ahmed III had Ali Chaouch's envoy given the caftan and the three tails, a sign of the dignity of a "pasha". This title was attributed to all his successors until 1830.

Algiers once again experienced prosperity thanks to corsairing and expeditions to the European coasts.

== Background ==
Not much is known about the origins of Ali. Some sources describe him as a Basche-Chaouch, (which would explain the name) a title usually held by Kouloughlis, which would mean that he was most likely of mixed Algerian-Turkish descent, albeit it's up for debate.

== Rule ==
=== Ending unrest ===
He made major political reforms, succeeding Dely Ibrahim Dey in a period of great unrest. He was described as “an honest and very reasonable man” by French consul Clairambault. The insurrections which, for more than twenty years, had bloodied the city of Algiers, had brought all sorts of brigands; Ali administered severe justice, and, in the first months of his reign, executed more than 1500 janissaries; it was to these necessary rigors that he owed his ability to impose order and govern in peace.

=== Government reforms ===
He had seen that the pashas sent by the Porte, although not enjoying any effective power, were a permanent cause of unrest, constantly intriguing in the hope of seeing their past authority return, or at least serving as a flag for the agitators; he decided to suppress them by banishing Pasha Charkan Ibrahim, appointed by the Ottoman Empire; In 1711 he refused to allow the pasha who had just been sent there to enter Algiers, and had him threatened with death if he insisted on disembarking. The pasha withdrew to Collo, then died shortly after of illness. At the same time, the dey sent an embassy to Ahmed III, representing to him the serious disadvantages of the multiplicity of powers; the good reasons he gave, combined with the gifts he had sent, were enough to convince the sultan, and the two dignities were united on the same person; He was the first dey to incorporate the title of pasha into his own. He thus formalized the status of Algiers as an independent political entity. Algerian historian Abderrahmane Djilali compared Algerian relations with the Ottoman Empire at this point to the states belonging to the Commonwealth realm.

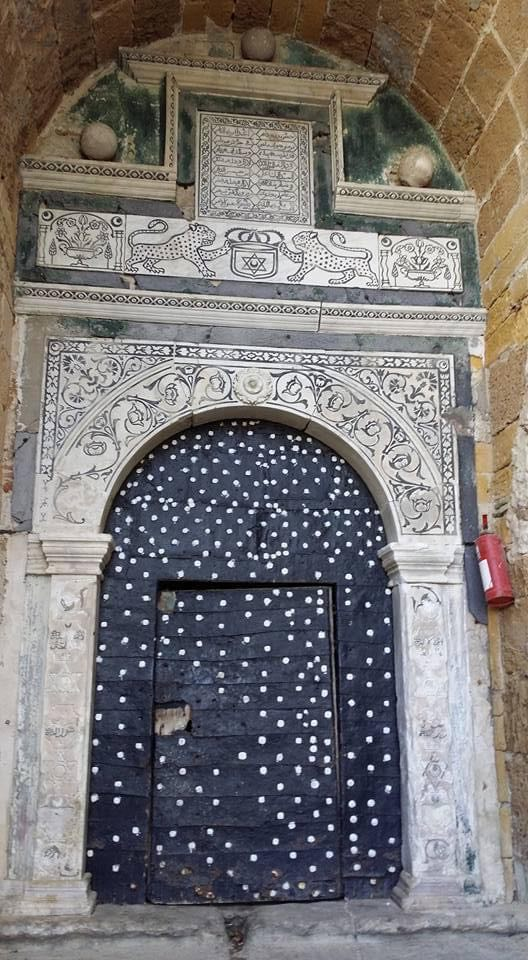
Gate of Lions (Bab sboua) topped by a poem in Arabic mentioning Baba Ali's reconstruction of the gate

From that moment on, the deys gained considerably in strength, and the Divan of Algiers no longer had the same power as before. Baba Ali Chaouch consolidated his authority; He reformed the Divan of Algiers, dissolved it and then recomposed it, eliminated the rebellious elements of the Odjak of Algiers, relied on the tai'fa of raïs to revive privateering in the Mediterranean and brought much income into the city. Because of his position, he was popular with the people of Algiers and is famous in historiography.

=== International policy ===
During the first three years of his reign, Ali was sued for peace by the Dutch Republic, Sicilians, Great Britain and the Holy Roman Empire; everyone made enormous presents to obtain it. He declared war on the Dutch in 1715, and planned to do the same to Britain, albeit he abandoned these plans after they paid tribute. In 1716, war was declared against him again as the Swedes and Danes were no happier, and the corso received a great boost, because the dey, instructed by the example of his predecessors, saw that this was the only way to ensure the pay of the militia.

A violent earthquake hit Algiers under his rule in 1716. To repair their losses, the corsairs ravaged the coasts of the Mediterranean and those of Portugal more than ever. They made such considerable captures from Dutch and British merchant shipping that maritime insurance went from the rate of 1.5% to 45%. European states decreed, under penalty of heavy fines, that all commercial ships only leave port well armed with cannons, manned by a crew capable of usefully defending itself.

== Death ==
Despite many conspiracies and assassination attempts, notably in 1713 then in 1716, he died a natural death in 1718.

== See also ==
- List of governors and rulers of the Regency of Algiers
- Barbary Coast
