= Hadj Ahmed Chabane =

4th Dey of Algiers (1688-1695)

- Dey
- Dey Hadj Chabane (right) confronting Louis XIV, who is reduced to suing for peace (Dutch satirical medal from 1689).

4th Dey of Algiers
- Reign: 1688– 14 August 1695
- Predecessor: Mezzo Morto Hüseyin Pasha
- Successor: Hadj Ahmed
- Born: Ahmed Chabane Cogia; 1628 – 1633; Anatolia, Ottoman Empire
- Died: 15 August or 10 September 1695; Algiers, Regency of Algiers
- Country: Regency of Algiers
- Religion: Islam
- Occupation: Odjak then Dey
- Military career
- Conflicts: Battle of Moulouya; Revolt in Algiers (1692); Battle of Djidioua; Tunisian–Algerian War (1694)

Hadj Ahmed Chabane Dey (Arabic:الحاج احمد شعبان داي, romanized: al-ḥāǧ Aḥmad šaʿbān dāy) (d. 1695) was the fourth Dey of Algiers. He ruled from 1688 to 1695, and was the first member of the Algerian Janissary Odjak to ever assume this position. Under his leadership, Algeria enjoyed good relations with France. His military campaigns against Morocco and Tunis were successful. However, his enemies turned his Eastern army against him; he was removed from power and executed.

== Rule ==
=== Biography ===
Dey Hadj Ahmed Chabane was of Turkish origin, born in Anatolia and aged 55 to 60 when he was elected by the Divan of Algiers. He was described by a Christian observer as a "man of spirit, joyful, discreet, promptly taking a resolution and executing it with vigor. He was known for his bravery, he was said to keep his word, he was enterprising, exact in following the practices of his false religion [false, that is, to a Christian], bold and even insolent towards those who put up any resistance to him. But good and gentle towards the officers; it was even to this benevolence that he was indebted for his fortune." French orientalist Pétis de la Croix, who knew Algiers and wrote a memorandum on the city in 1695, described him by saying, “He is a man characterized by wisdom, cheerfulness, and modesty. He is committed to the rulings of Sharia law and adheres to his Islamic faith. He preferred a life of austerity, as he was content with his annual salary, which was estimated at 106 écus."

=== Quotes ===
Our State is the Boulevard of North Africa and our city is the Cornerstone.

— Hadj Ahmed Chabane, 1689,

=== Relations with France ===
On 24 March 1690, a ceremony took place in Algiers where René Lemaire was officially welcomed as the French consul in the embassy with Algiers. Dey Chabane held him in high regard. In July 1690, Lemaire successfully organized the sending of an Algerian Embassy to the court of Versailles, which attracted a lot of interest. Hadj Chabane ensured that he maintained good relations with the French, and a peace treaty was signed between the two.

Most Illustrious and Magnificent Lord, We have learned, through the letter you have written to us, of your disposition to maintain peace, which was established by Commissioner Marcel with the Pasha and the Divan of Algiers. As the treaty presented to us aligns with our intentions, we hereby ratify, through this letter, the articles agreed upon. We instruct the Commanders of our vessels and Mr. Vaudré, Intendant of the Marine at the port of Toulon, to execute them immediately, hoping that you, on your part, will ensure that the conditions of a solemn treaty are not violated by any contravention.

— Louis XIV To Ahmed Chabane, 1688,

== Memoirs ==
One day, Dey Chabane caught a corsair hiding something under his burnouse at the Divan. When the dey asked the corsair to reveal what he was hiding, he showed him a plum, claiming he had bought it from a merchant from Marseille. The dey remarked, "If you can afford such fine fruit, you must have stolen it, as you would have prioritized buying fresh bread for your family instead. You deserve 100 strokes of the bastinado for causing your family to suffer due to your gluttony." The dey then took the corsair to the merchant he claimed to have bought the plum from. The merchant recognized the plum basket as the one stolen from him. This proved that the corsair had lied; the corsair's sentence was increased to 500 lashes for theft and lying about it.

== Military Campaigns ==
=== Battle of Moulouya (1692) ===
Hadj Chabane took the lead in his first campaign during the Battle of Moulouya, which was caused by persistent Sultanate of Fez incursions into sovereign territories. The delineation of borders between The Regency and Sultanate of Fez was initially established along the Moulouya River After the Campaign of Tlemcen in 1551 The campaign proved successful resulting in the defeat of the ruler of the Sultanate of Fez, Ismael Ben Cherif though it did not prevent further incursion attempts.

=== Revolt in Algiers (1692) ===
Upon arriving in Algiers back from the Moulouya campaign, he found the city in full rebellion. The Kabyle people, incited by the Bey of Tunis, had conspired with the Baldi tribe to plot the expulsion of the Loldach tribe, and had hidden in large numbers in the houses, waiting for an opportune moment. They hoped that the Moroccans would be victorious, and that they would then only have to close the city gates to the fleeing Algerians and hand them over to the Moroccans. Upon the victorious return of Chabane, a bloody battle broke out in the streets. The revolt was crushed; four or five hundred of the insurgents were beheaded, and their tribes were subjected to an exorbitant war tax. The massacre took place on the same day that Ramadan ended.

=== Battle of Djidioua ===
In 1692, following the Algerian victory and protection of its territories in the eastern side of the Moulouya River, Ismail Ibn Sharif endeavored to occupy it in 1693, but was stopped by Algerian local tribes, who with the Spanish, drove them out of Oran. Ismail Ben Sharif recognized the strategic value of the river's eastern flank, which encompassed cities such as Oujda, Fguig, Berkane, and others. This territory also held significant economic and importance for the Moroccan emirate. Ismail Ibn Sherif commissioned an army to traverse the field of the Moulouya River, penetrating deeper into Algerian territory. The confrontation persisted until the Moroccan army reached the crucial location of Relizane, where they encountered formidable resistance from a well-prepared Algerian army. They ultimately succumbed once more to the forces led by Chabane.

=== Campaign In Tunisia ===
In 1694, Hadj Chabane, supported by the Tripolitans, resolved to chastise Mohamed Bey El Mouradi and declined the tribute offered as a gesture of submission. The two armies converged at El Kef on 24 June 1694. On the same day, Mohamed Bey El Mouradi launched an attack against the Algerians, only to be defeated. Subsequently, he initiated a new assault the following day, met with no greater success. On 26 June, Chabane assumed the offensive, breached the enemy lines, and pursued them to Tunis, ultimately capturing the city, making Tunisia an Algerian vassal and tributary state.

== Death ==
Chabane returned to Algiers on 16 February 1695, dragging behind him the captured cannons, 120 mules loaded with gold and silver, and a large number of slaves. On 25 February, he narrowly escaped assassination at the mosque while he was praying; the culprit denounced his accomplices, who were executed alongside him. These executions heightened the discontent among the Loldach tribe, who complained of being sacrificed for the sake of the favorite. The latter had just been expelled by the people of Tunis, and Mohamed Bey El Mouradi, returning from Chios, had won over the garrison of Constantine with gifts, which rallied to his cause. The spirit of sedition spread to the Eastern army; it turned back and arrived in front of Algiers on 5 August, demanding loudly the head of Chabane. Despite his efforts to defend himself, Chabane was imprisoned and tortured for ten days, without the cruelty of his tormentors being able to make him reveal the whereabouts of his treasures. On 13 August, he received more than eight hundred blows with a stick, he was officially put out of power on 14 August and Chabane was strangled the next day on 15 August 1695. Another source wrote that he died on 10 September 1695.

== See also ==
- List of governors and rulers of the Regency of Algiers
