= Hamdan Khodja =

Algerian dignitary and academic

- Native name: حمدان بن عثمان خوجة
- Born: 1773 Algiers, Regency of Algiers
- Died: 1842 (aged 68–69) Istanbul, Ottoman Empire
- Language: Arabic
- Notable works: "Le Miroir"
- Relatives: Othman Khodja (father)

Hamdan ben Othman Khodja (حمدان بن عثمان خوجة) (1773–1842) was an Algerian dignitary and scholar. He wrote the book "Le Miroir" in which he denounced the encroachments by French soldiers in Algiers, thus becoming the first essayist on this subject.

== Biography ==
Khodja was born in Algiers in 1773 to a family of Turkish origin active in the high administration of the regency. His father was a Turkish scholar, an alim and also the defterdar of the deylik. His mother was a Moorish woman from Algiers. He was thus a kouloughli. Hamdan received an excellent education and was well travelled. He was taught religious sciences by his father, and succeeded greatly academically. As a reward, in 1784, when his uncle was chosen to take the dey’s gift to Constantinople, he was allowed to accompany him. After his father’s death, his uncle brought him into his business and sent him in his stead to cities such as Tunis, Livorno, Marseille, London and Gibraltar, thereby giving him the opportunity to learn Turkish, French and English. Khodja became known as one of the most important merchants and richest men in Algiers, and was in very great demand from colleagues desiring to participate in his commercial operations, which extended to both the Ottoman Empire and Europe.

When he became a victim of the French conquest of 1830, he sent a petition to King Louis Philippe to complain about the atrocities committed against him by the French Army. Furthermore, Khodja wrote the book "Le Miroir" in which he denounced the encroachments by French soldiers in Algiers, thus becoming the first essayist on this subject; it was translated into French and printed in Paris in 1833.

== Bibliography ==
- Abi-Mershed, Osama (2010), Apostles of Modernity: Saint-Simonians and the Civilizing Mission in Algeria, Stanford University Press, ISBN 978-0804769099.
- Djebar, Assia (2000), So Vast the Prison (Vaste Est la Prison), Seven Stories Press, ISBN 1583220674.
- Panzac, Daniel (2005), Barbary Corsairs: The End of a Legend, 1800-1820, BRILL, ISBN 9004125949.
- Shuval, Tal (2000), "The Ottoman Algerian Elite and Its Ideology", International Journal of Middle East Studies, 32 (3), Cambridge University Press: 323–344, doi:10.1017/s0020743800021127, S2CID 153941466.
