= Hadj Moustapha =

Ruler of Algiers, 1700 to 1705

Hadj Mustapha
- Dey of Algiers
- Seal of Hadj Mustapha

7th Dey of Algiers
- Reign: 1700–1705
- Predecessor: Hassen Chaouch
- Successor: Hussein Khodja
- Died: 1705; Collo, Regency of Algiers
- Country: Regency of Algiers
- Religion: Islam
- Occupation: Agha, then Dey
- Military career
- Conflicts: Maghrebi war (1699-1702); Tunisian–Algerian War (1705)

Hadj Mustapha was the 7th ruler and Dey of Algiers. He ruled five years after his predecessor Hadj Chaouch.

== Rule ==
=== Early career ===
In 1700 the Algerian Dey Hadj Chaouch was forced to resign from his title of bey when Algerian Janissaries rose up against him, the Diwan of Algiers Decided that Mustapha would take his place as he was his old Agha at the time.

The same year, the Bey of Tunis Murad III launched a campaign against the Beylik of Constantine. Alongside with Zeïdan ben Ismail who also launched a campaign against the Beylik of Mascara and had already begun pillaging cities such as Tlemcen. The Bey of Constantine Ali Khodja Bey was killed by the Tunisians, for the Algerian Counter attack, Hadj mustapha would eventually manage to beat both the invasions in the battles of Jouami' Al-Ulama and Chelif. Even tho the war seemed over, Murad bey would somehow prepare a large army in Kef for a second invasion of Constantine. But this would seem useless as he was assassinated by Ibrahim El-Sharif who just came back from Istanbul to take his place.

=== War against Tunisia and death ===
After the Maghrebi war, the republic fell into chaos and also in terrible dept and economic instability, the dey would unnecessarily raise taxes as the Italian and Spanish coastal cities became poor. Mustapha believed that the only solution for him was to invade and pillage the neighboring state of Tunis against Ibrahim El-Sharif. After taking the city of Kef and put Tunis in siege, but would eventually lift it after a couple of days after the bey Ibrahim proposed him a ransom of 150,000 Piasters. On his way to the capital, he would be attacked by a small coalition of Kabyles and Tunisians but would suffer from 500 casualties. This delayed the time of arrival of Mustapha, but managed to finally enter the capital in the 12th of October. Even tho he had slaughtered almost an entire army in his way, Algerian janissaries rose up with the lead of Hussein Khodja, Mustapha escaped the city as soon as the revolt broke down. But he would be captured by Janissaries and be paraded on a donkey before being hanged by the rebels.

== See also ==
- List of governors and rulers of the Regency of Algiers
