= Khaznadar =

Khaznadar is a surname of Turkish origin, derived from a word meaning treasurer, and used mostly in Tunisia. Today, the surname is most prevalent in Algeria and Tunisia.

== Notable people ==
Notable people with this surname include:

- Maruf Khaznadar (1930–2010), Kurdish writer
- Mohamed Arbi Zarrouk Khaznadar (1760-1822), Tunisian politician
- Mohammed Khaznadar (1810-1889), Tunisian politician
- Mustapha Khaznadar (1878–1817), Tunisian politician

== See also ==
- Hazinedar (surname)
