= Dey =

Ottoman-era North African title

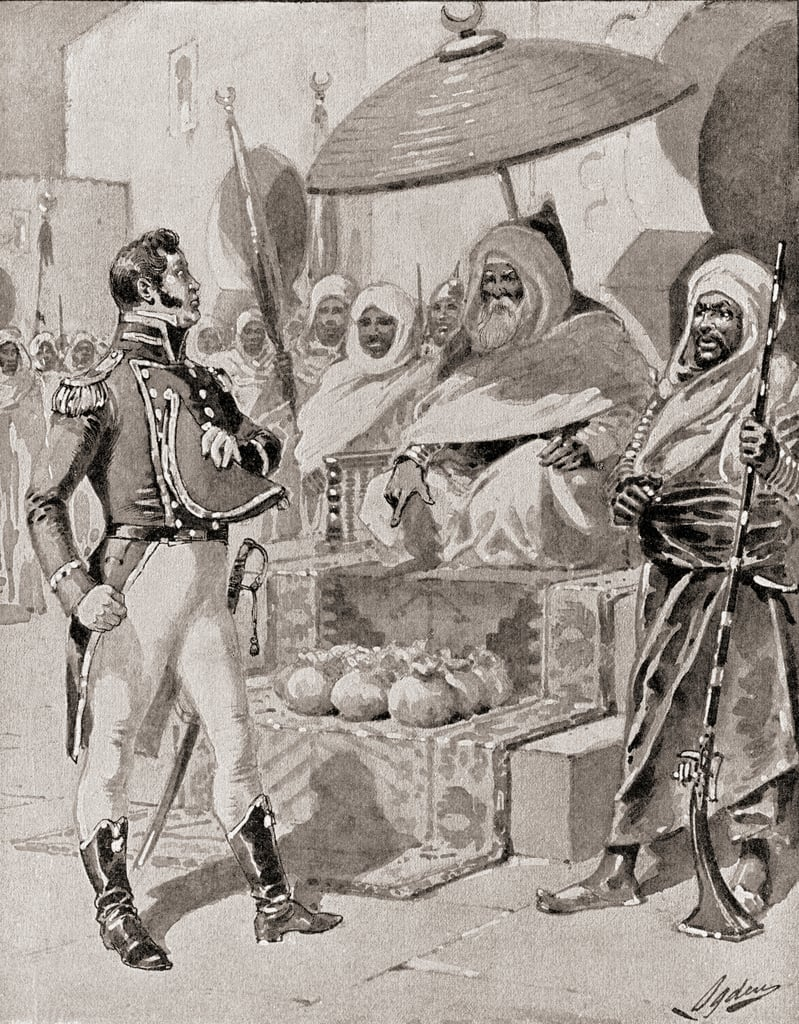
The American commander William Bainbridge paying tribute to the dey, circa 1800

Dey (Algerian Arabic: داي, from Ottoman Turkish: دایی, romanized: dayı, lit. 'uncle') was the title of the rulers of the regencies of Algiers, Tripolitania, and Tunis under the Ottoman Empire from 1671 onwards. Twenty-nine deys held office from the establishment of the deylicate in Algeria until the French conquest in 1830.

The dey was chosen by local civilian, military, and religious leaders to govern for life and ruled with a high degree of autonomy from the Ottoman sultan. The main sources of his revenues were taxes on the agricultural population, religious tributes, and protection payments rendered by Corsairs, regarded as pirates who preyed on Mediterranean shipping. In the European part of the Ottoman Empire, in particular during its decline, leaders of the outlawed janissary and yamak troops sometimes acquired title of Dahi or Dahia, which is derived from Dey.

The dey was assisted in governing made up of the Chiefs of the Army and Navy, the Director of Shipping, the Treasurer-General and the Collector of Tributes.

The realm of the dey of Alger (Algiers) was divided into three provinces (Constantine, Titteri and Mascara), each of which was administered by a bey (باي) whom he appointed.

The rule of the deys of Alger ended on 5 July 1830, when Hussein Dey (1765–1838) surrendered to invading French forces.

The last Dey of Tripoli was killed by Ahmed Karamanli, who established the eponymous Karamanli dynasty in 1711.

== Investiture of the deys of Algiers ==
According to Ottoman Algerian dignitary and scholar Hamdan khodja, The Dey or Pasha can only be invested with this dignity by the members of the Divan in their presence, and even when the kaftan and the firman of the Ottoman Porte arrives, it is they who, after having made the election, designate the person of the sovereign to the envoy of the Sublime Porte who comes to bring the nomination of whom they have already nominated.

At each bairam (or feast), this ceremony is renewed in the following way: a meeting is held in a room; the Dey, the one who was appointed, places himself in the middle of the Divan; his re-election is proposed, and when this re-election is made, his diploma is returned to him; but if there is any difference of opinion, another dey is appointed in his place.

In the 18th century, following the coup of Baba Ali Chaouche, the Divan was weakened, as the Deys became stronger. By the 19th century, the Divan was mostly ignored, especially the private Janissary Divan. The dey's council, (also called Cabinet by William Shaler) became more and more powerful. Dey Ali Khodja weakened the Janissary Divan to the point where they held no power. This angered the Janissaries, who launched a coup against the Dey. The coup failed, since the Dey successfully raised an army of Kabyle Zwawa cavalry, Arab infantry and Kouloughli troops. Many of the Janissaries were executed, while the rest fled, and the Divan moved to the citadel of the Casbah.

== See also ==
- List of Pashas and Deys of Algiers
- List of Pashas and Deys of Tripoli
- Baig
- Bey

== Sources ==
- Bertarelli, L.V. (1929). Guida d'Italia, Vol. XVII (in Italian). Milano: Consociazione Turistica Italiana.
