= Odjak of Algiers =

1518–1830 unit of the Algerine army

- Ujaq
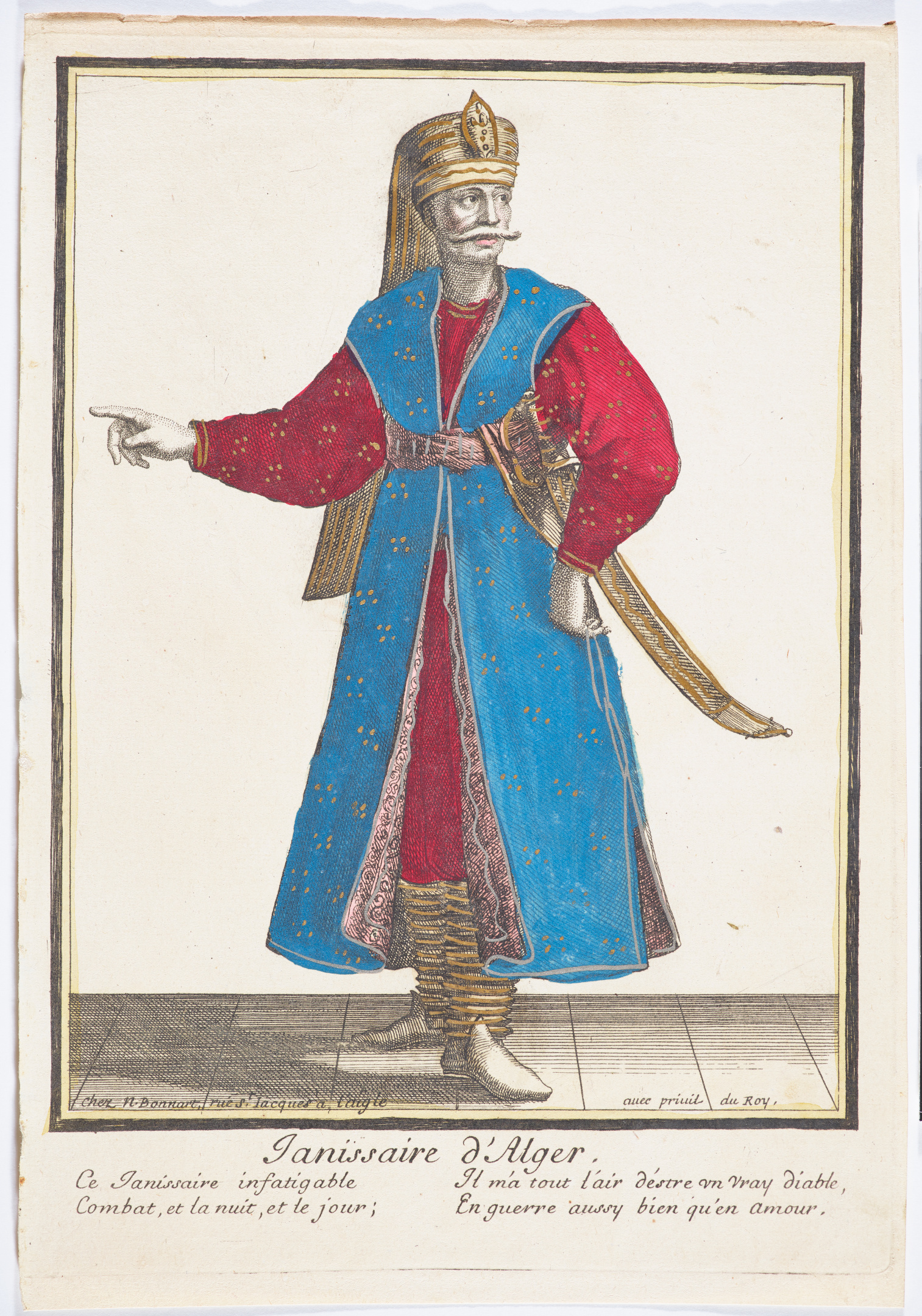
- A Janissary of Algiers
- Active: 1518-1830
- Disbanded: De jure 1830, De facto 1837
- Countries: Ottoman Empire, Regency of Algiers, Kabylia and captives from the Spanish Empire, the Kingdom of France, the Kingdom of Sardinia and the Kingdom of Naples
- Allegiance: Agha of the Odjak
- Size: 12,000 (1600); 7,000 (1750); 4,000 (1800)
- Main location: Algiers
- Equipment: Initially: Equipment by the Ottoman Empire; Nimcha, Kabyle musket, and other locally made weapons
- Engagements: Algiers expedition (1541); Tuggurt Expedition (1552); Odjak of Algiers Revolution; French-Algerian War 1681–88; Battle of Moulouya; Tunisian-Algerian Wars; Invasion of Algiers (1775); Invasion of Algiers in 1830; Battle of Constantine

Commanders
- Notable commanders: Ibrahim Agha

The Odjak of Algiers (also spelled Ujaq or Ocak) was the local corps of the Janissary militia in the Regency of Algiers, forming the backbone of its professional army from around 1518 until the French conquest in 1830 (with de facto dissolution by 1837).

Highly autonomous within the broader Ottoman Janissary Corps, the Odjak operated independently from imperial headquarters in Istanbul, mirroring the Regency's own semi-independent relationship with the Sublime Porte. Recruited primarily from Anatolian Turks and other Ottoman subjects (often through voluntary enlistment or hereditary service within the corps), its members remained lifelong professional soldiers, largely insulated from local Algerian society.

Led by an Agha (commander-in-chief), the Odjak served multiple roles: as the Regency's main defensive force against external threats, a Praetorian Guard protecting (and sometimes deposing) rulers, and an instrument of internal repression and control until its power was curtailed in 1817.

The Odjak encompassed all Janissaries in Algiers as a dominant political faction. Its central institution was the Diwân of Algiers (divan or council), established in the 16th century by Hayreddin Barbarossa following the consolidation of Ottoman rule. Initially seated in the Djenina Palace (Palais de la Jenina), the assembly later moved to the Kasbah citadel (including the Palace of the Dey).

== Background ==
When Oruç Barbarossa (Aruj Reis) envisioned transitioning from a corsair leader to the sultan and founder of a structured state in Algiers around 1516, his military support consisted solely of his ships' crews and loyal corsair captains—his longtime companions at sea. These men voluntarily acknowledged his supremacy, granting him authority through mutual consent in what amounted to a military oligarchy. Oruç's power, initially accepted freely, rapidly became absolute; he enforced it rigorously against any dissent.

Upon Oruç's death in 1518 during clashes with Spanish forces, his brother Hayreddin Barbarossa (Khizr Reis) succeeded him without opposition. Facing ongoing threats from Spain and the need for stronger backing, Hayreddin declared vassalage to the Ottoman Porte. In return, Sultan Selim I (and later Süleyman the Magnificent) provided crucial aid: approximately 2,000 elite Janissaries plus around 4,000 Turkish volunteers, who were integrated into the privileges of the Janissary corps. This infusion established a professional Ottoman-aligned military foundation in Algiers.

To administer state affairs and govern the territory, Hayreddin relied on a carefully selected council (diwân) drawn from trusted Janissary members. Over time, however, this arrangement constrained absolute sovereign power. The first Janissaries elected their leaders, but later formalized advancement through fixed regulations. Their customs placed them outside ordinary jurisdiction, with punishments handled secretly within the corps. This autonomy transformed the Algerian Odjak (the local Janissary militia) into a distinct political and military entity, reducing the Ottoman-appointed governor's (pasha's) role to largely symbolic status.

What started as a purely military formation under Hayreddin Barbarossa evolved into the Regency's chief administrative and governing body. By the mid-17th century, the Diwân wielded real authority, electing the head of state and frequently dominating rule—most prominently during the Agha period (1659–1671). This era began with the Odjak Revolution of 1659, when Janissaries, led by Khalil Agha, overthrew the corrupt pasha system amid grievances over mismanaged funds and Ottoman interference. The Regency shifted to a military republic (stratocracy), with elected Aghas (starting with Khalil Agha) ruling as Hakem. Terms were deliberately short and rotating to prevent power consolidation, while the Diwân oversaw high policy, finances, and military justice.

== Stratocratic elite ==
=== Private janissary Diwan ===
The Odjak of the Regency of Algiers served as both the primary military force and the effective governing body of the state. The line between military and civil administration was often blurred, as the same corps supplied personnel for both roles. Officers and soldiers from the Janissaries filled administrative positions, and high-ranking members frequently held political authority.

==== Composition of the private Diwan ====
According to historian William Spencer, any recruit could advance through the ranks, typically rising one position every three years. Over time, a veteran would serve under 24 senior officers known as Bolukbachi (or bölükbaşı), who participated in voting on major policy decisions.

Algerian dignitary Hamdan Khodja described a private Divan (council) composed of around sixty Bolukbachis, or senior officers. This body convened every morning at daybreak in a dedicated chamber to deliberate on administrative matters, exercising authority as the supreme council of army chiefs. Membership required meeting strict conditions outlined in the regulations, including demonstrated experience, competence, and prior service in both the army and navy. Most members were older men, often married to local Algerian women.

Civil servants were drawn from the same Janissary corps, and the highest ranks carried significant political or administrative responsibilities. For instance, the most senior bölükbaşı was often selected as an ambassador to foreign courts. Training occurred within combat units—whether at sea as corsairs or on land—and this same corps managed both state administration and military operations. Even former corsair captains sometimes transitioned into state roles, such as dragomans (interpreters) serving European consuls.

By the 1660s, pashas appointed from Istanbul had lost real influence over Odjak decisions. Power shifted decisively to elected members of the militia, who became the Regency's political and military leaders.

==== The Janissary Agha ====
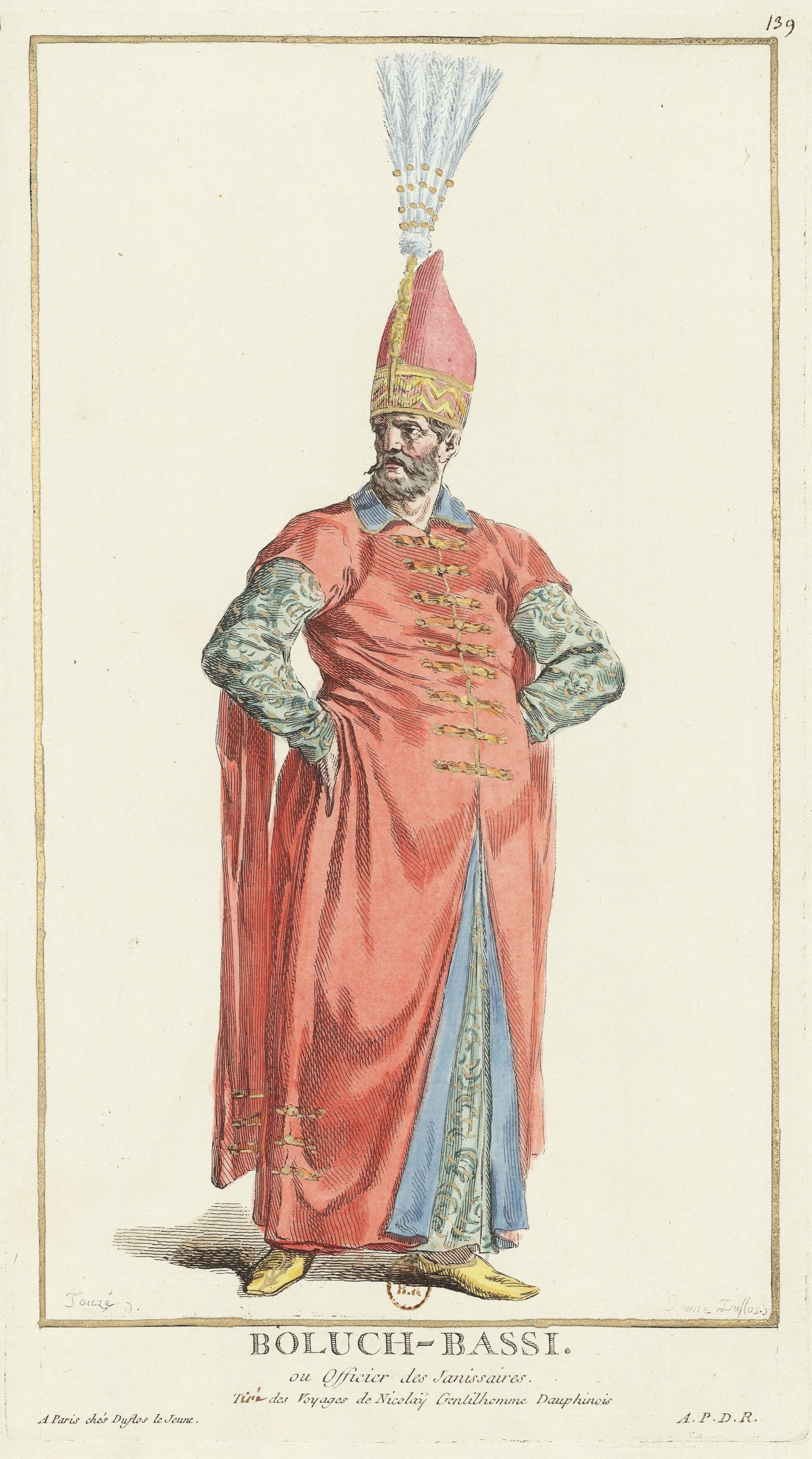
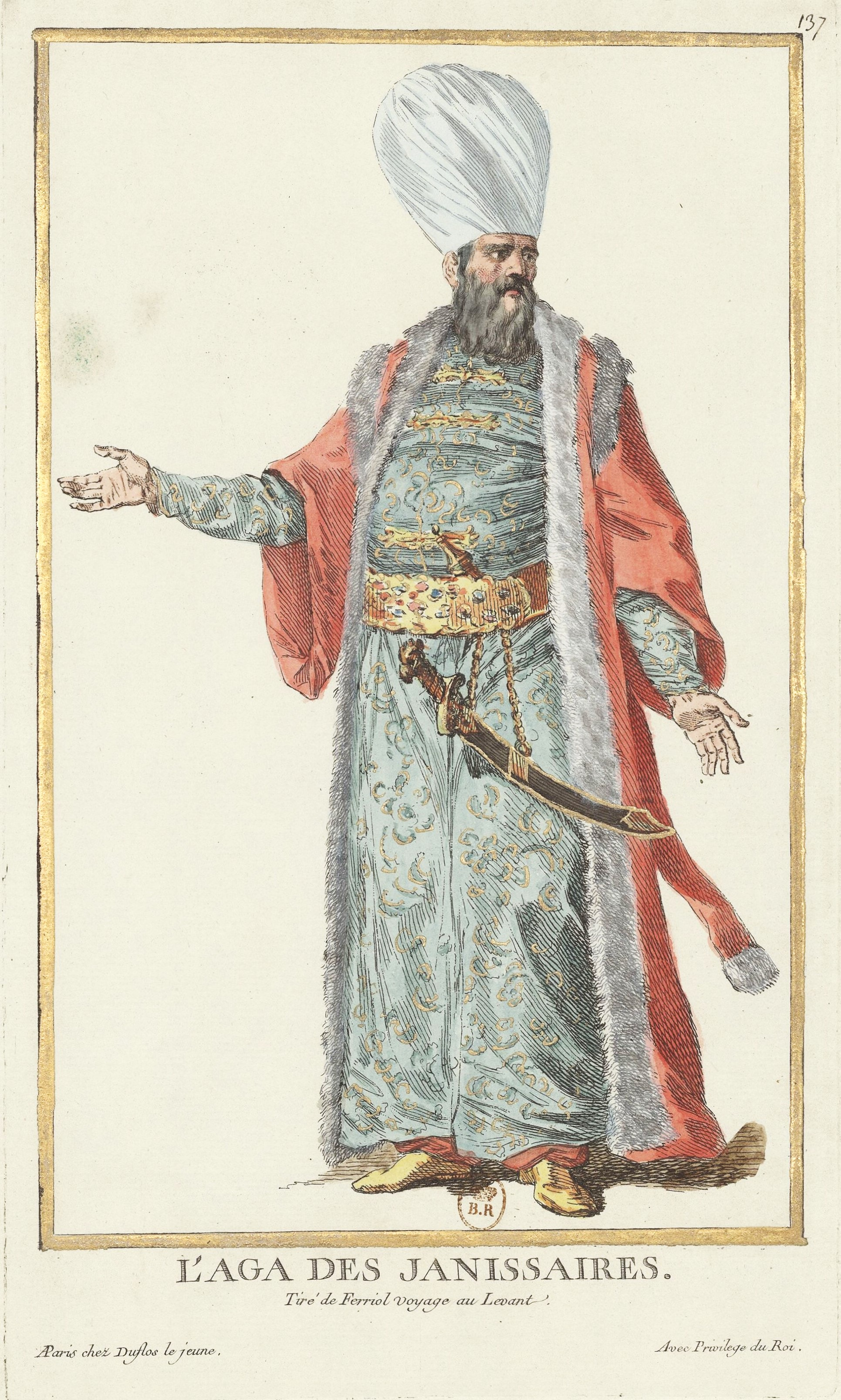
Janissary bolukbasi (Senior officer) (left), Janissary Agha (right)

The commander-in-chief, known as the Agha of Two Moons, was elected for a two-month term as president of the Divan through a system of "democracy by seniority." During the Agha period (1659–1671), he served as the Regency's ruler under the title Hakem.

The Agha held the Fundamental Pact ('Ahad aman) of 1748, often regarded as the Regency's constitutional foundation. As Hamdan Khodja explained: "the head of the Divan was called Aghat-el-Askar; he carried a saber and a relic containing the Regency's regulations (their charter), which he was required to keep with him at all times."

A list of officers eligible for the position—based on seniority—was presented to the Janissaries, who could approve the eldest candidate or select another from those next in line. To prevent any Agha from consolidating power, the term was strictly limited to two months, with each eligible member taking the presidency in turn according to seniority. Additional safeguards existed: at the end of his term, the Agha retired, lost his active Janissary status, and could no longer participate in assemblies. The Divan could also suspend him, with the Kahia (deputy) assuming interim leadership.

The broader hierarchy included:

- Bach-bolukbachi: The foremost officer by seniority.
- Around 20 Yabachis: Officers distinguished by white plumes, assigned to escort the pasha (in ceremonial contexts) to the mosque on Fridays.
- Maaloukbachi: The Janissaries' spokesperson, who conveyed the militia's requests and grievances to the pasha.
- 4 Soldachis: Advisory officers close to the pasha, permitted to dine at his table.
- Around 30 officers commanding individual camps, each comprising 300–400 Janissaries.

This structure reflected a unique oligarchic military republic, where advancement and leadership depended primarily on longevity of service rather than merit or external appointment, ensuring broad participation among long-serving members while limiting individual dominance.

=== Tasks of the private Diwan ===
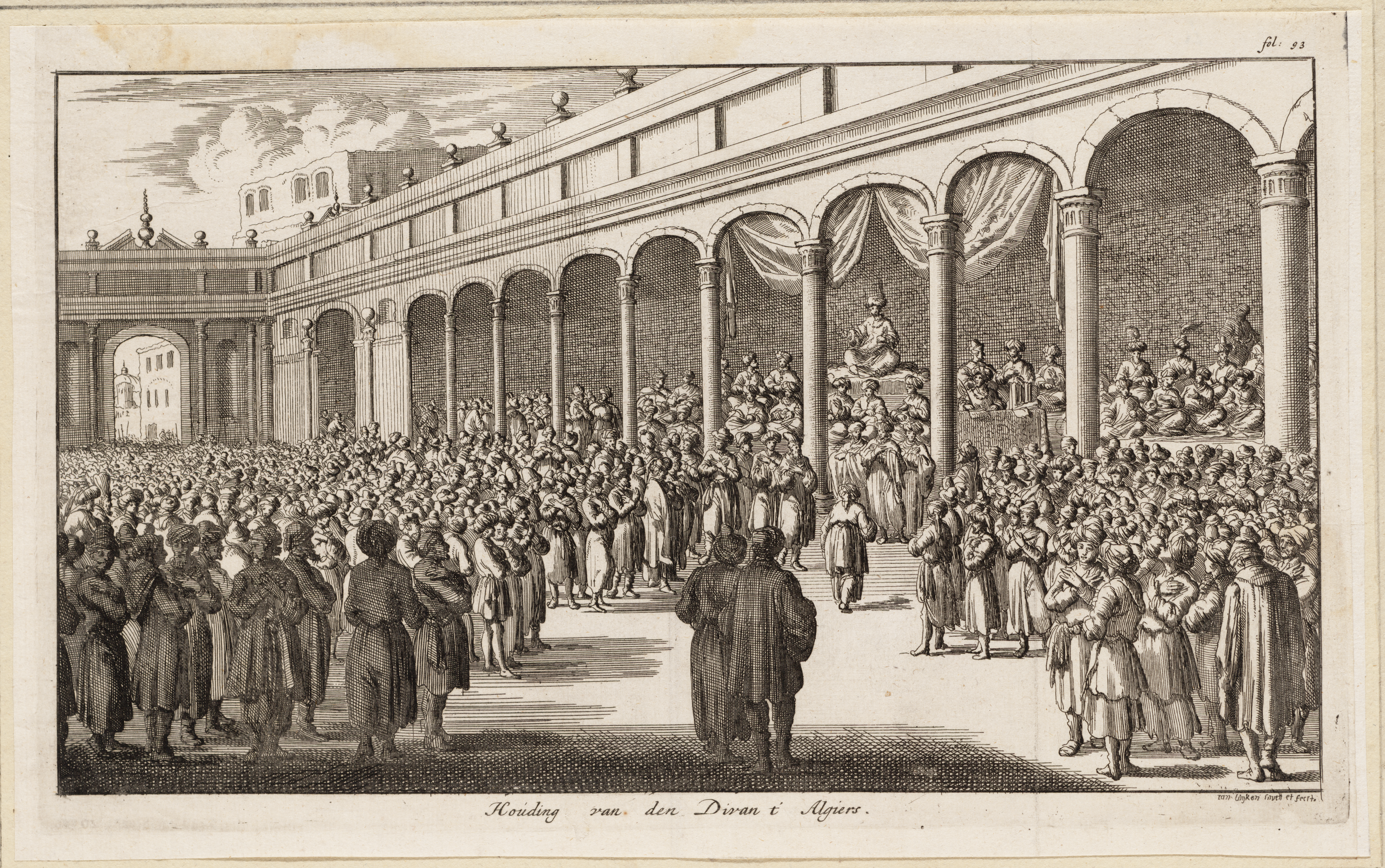
Hasan Agha of Algiers presiding over the divan

The private Divan (Diwân khass or inner council) of the Janissary Odjak held supreme authority over the Regency of Algiers' high internal and external policy. Composed of senior officers (primarily the Bolukbachis), it deliberated on critical matters of state. In cases of internal disorder—such as tribal revolts or blocked roads—the Divan gathered information, assessed the situation, and decided on measures to restore order.

The Divan also oversaw financial matters with strict controls. Soldier payments occurred only in the presence of the president (Agha or equivalent chief). The state treasury could be opened solely with the Khoja (state notary) and a special commission present, where each member held a key and maintained a register to record all entries and exits of funds. Even the Dey could not access or dispose of public funds independently; he appeared as an ordinary soldier to receive his salary or civil list allocation.

Judicial powers rested with the Divan president for disciplinary and legal matters involving Turks and Kouloughlis (mixed Turkish-local descent). Offenders faced imprisonment only in the Divan’s prison. For cases governed by military regulations, judges could consult the Qadi (Islamic judge) for opinions on applicable laws. Any penalties required the Divan president's order for execution, which took place in the Divan chamber itself. This mechanism enforced the Qadi's judgments, as regular Janissary soldiers were tried exclusively under military law, not civil law applicable to Moors (local Muslims).

=== End of the Private Janissary Divan’s Dominance ===
The early 19th century saw growing instability, marked by revolts and rapid turnover of deys, ultimately eroding the Janissaries' unchecked power. In 1805, amid a famine, popular unrest targeted Jewish merchants. The company of Busnach and Bacri held large wheat stocks, prompting accusations of profiteering. Dey Mustapha Pasha (r. 1798–1805) exiled some Jewish families and confiscated property, but the Janissaries deemed these steps inadequate. They seized and executed the Dey.

In 1808, another revolt erupted over dissatisfaction with the ongoing Tunisian war, Napoleonic pressures, the release of Italian captives, and the Dey’s wife residing in the Djenina palace. Dey Ahmed was killed and replaced by Ali al-Ghassal, who was soon strangled in yet another uprising. Afterward, the Divan was largely sidelined as Dey Hadj Ali (r. 1809–1815) asserted stronger personal authority.

By 1817, the Janissaries accused Dey Omar Pasha (r. 1815–1817) of treason and cowardice for negotiating with British Admiral Lord Exmouth under pressure from locals, Kouloughlis, and even some Janissaries (following the 1816 Bombardment of Algiers, which forced an end to Christian slavery). They seized and killed him, installing Ali Khodja (r. 1817–1818). The latter decisively broke the Janissaries' hold. He relocated from the Djenina palace to the fortified Kasbah above the city, securing protection from Kouloughlis and Kabyle soldiers. With this base, he imposed control over the militia. Upon the Janissaries' return from Kabylia, he attacked their barracks, significantly reducing their numbers and forcing the military into obedience.

This shift marked the effective end of the Janissary Odjak's long dominance over the Regency's governance, transitioning power toward the Dey supported by local auxiliaries rather than the traditional military council. The Odjak, once the core of both army and state, was subdued, reflecting broader decline amid external pressures and internal factionalism leading up to the French conquest in 1830.

== Composition ==
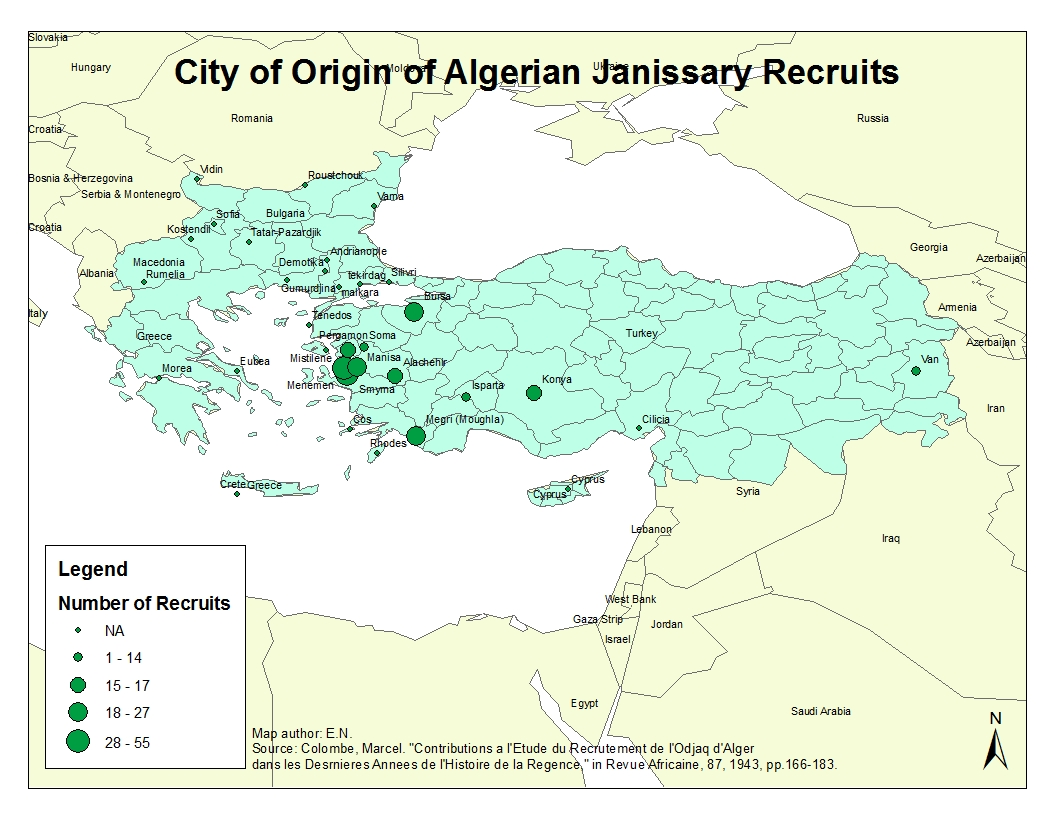
Origin of Algerian Janissary recruitment according to Marcel Colombe (1943)

Algiers has known the highest number of troops during the first half of the 17th century, this was demonstrated through the construction of two barracks (Eski and Yine Barracks in Algiers in 1627 and 1637 respectively), However, the number of the Janissaries went on a steady decline from the mid 18th century onwards; New recruits were insufficient to recover the military might of Algiers that was known a century prior, though efforts were made to compensate this void by recruiting local militias from the "Koulouglis", Zwawas and Arab tribes.

=== From the Ottoman Empire ===
The Odjak was initially mainly composed of foreigners. Commonly called by Europeans "Odjak" or "Turkish militia". The denomination "Turk", referred to the geographical and ethnic origin of most members of this militia, to their language, and to their belonging to a culture distinct from that of other Algerians. The majority of the unit during the 16th to 18th century were composed of "Anatolian Turks". But they also included Albanians, Greeks, Circassians, Maltese etc... They were recruited mainly from Smyrna in the Ottoman Empire, or in some cases from immigrants. The "Turks" therefore constituted the main element of the militia. Their distribution in the various military components of the odjak may indicate momentary changes in the regions of recruitment, but the majority of the recruits were from Anatolia, according to M. Colombe: "Of all the regions of the Empire, it was Anatolia that provided the major part of the Algerian recruitment". The exact size of the Odjak varied from 8,000 to 10,000, and was usually divided into several hundred smaller units (ortas).

=== Kouloughlis ===
Kouloughlis were people of mixed Ottoman and Moorish origins. In 1629 the Kouloughlis, allied with many other local tribes, attempted to drive out the Odjak and the janissaries. They failed and were expelled. In 1674, they were allowed to join the corps, but only first generation kouloughlis (direct sons of Turks). In 1694, this was relaxed, and all Kouloughlis were allowed to join the odjak.

=== Moors ===
Despite the fact that previously all locals had been barred from joining the Odjak, Arabs, Berbers, and Moors were allowed to join by the end of the 17th century in few numbers, as a way to replenish the unit, as time passed, and relations became more and more distant between the Ottoman Empire and the Regency, importation of troops became more and more problematic. Initially, some locals were allowed to join the odjak as garrison auxiliaries. This became more and more common, but only in isolated areas. As many Between 1699 and 1701, out of 40 cases of janissaries whose origins are mentioned, 5 had been recruited among the natives, but these were in mostly rural areas. In reality, the corps was still overwhelmingly Turkish. After a coup by Ali Chauch the Odjak was weakened, and the Dey-Pacha had far more authority than before. He weakened the janissaries, and forced them to lax their procedures. As time passed, these procedures were more and more lax. As the Odjak was the main force outside of the unreliable Arab-Berber tribal levy whom were in a lot of cases regarded as unloyal, it was thus important not to recruit people who would have tribal loyalties. Thus many Algerian orphans and criminals were recruited into the Odjak. In 1803, 1 in 17 troops of the Odjak were Arab or Berber. According to historian Daniel Panzac, about 10-15% of the Odjak was composed of native Algerians and renegades, however Kouloughlis were barred from joining the Odjak. By the 1820s, even Jews were allowed to join the Odjak of Algiers, although this was a highly controversial choice, and denounced by several members of Algerian society.

Paper strength of the Algerian Janissary corps
Year	1536	1587	1605	1621	1640	1660	1684	1731	1754	1785	1808	1815	1830	1830
Strength	2,000	6,000	10,000	6,000	12,000	6,000 families	14,000	14,000	12,000	8,000	10,000	4,000	4,500	3,500 expelled after French occupation

=== Training ===
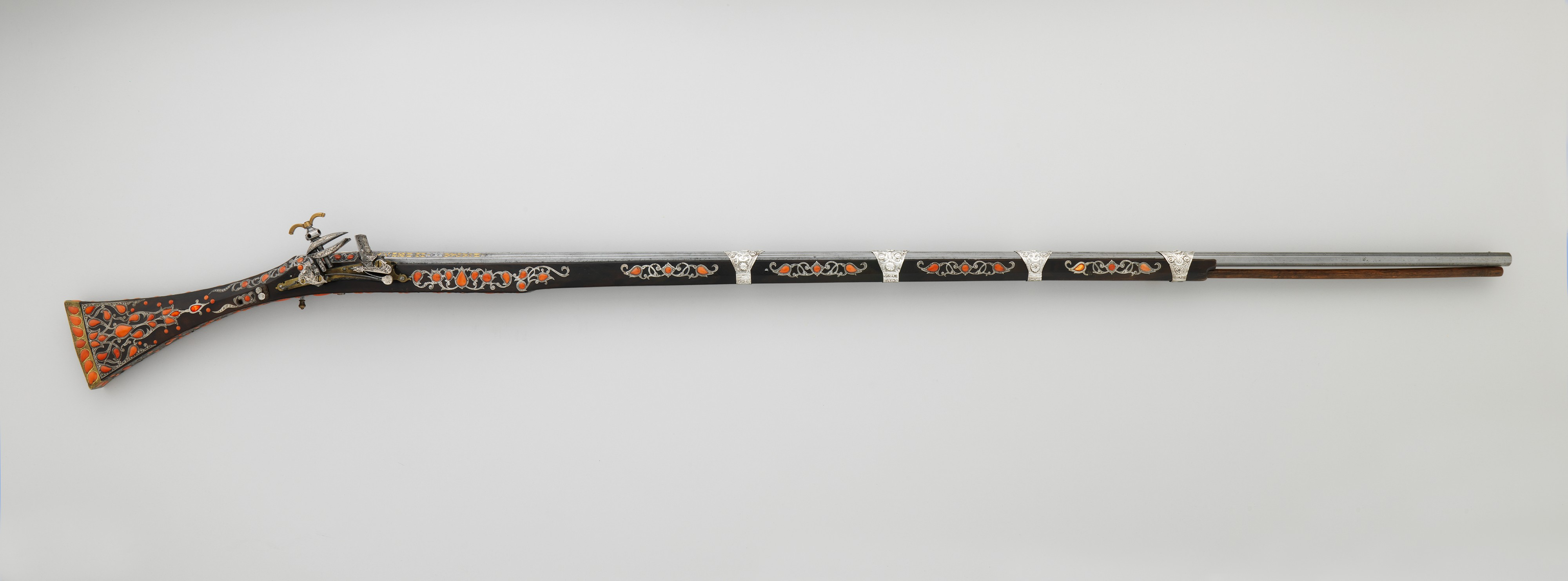
18th century coral decorated Miquelet firearm from Algiers

The Odjak of Algiers was among the earliest modern standing armies. Its recruits went through a demanding training system. Newcomers, called yeki yoldaşlar (lit. 'new comrades'), spent three years in basic training. They lived in the barracks and served veteran Janissaries while learning strict obedience to Odjak regulations, the use of bladed weapons and firearms, and both individual and group combat tactics. Their instructors were officers such as the baş yoldaş, the vekil harç (altı), or the odabaşı. Every Thursday they practiced shooting, sometimes combined with hunting trips outside the city, and they were allowed limited free time in Algiers under officer supervision.

The first-year recruits were rarely excused from garrison duty, land expeditions (mahalla), or naval campaigns. They joined military operations but stayed behind the front lines or provided support such as guarding tents and cooking until they gained experience. Younger recruits from Anatolia who were not yet old enough to bear arms were treated like Janissary orphans (çalaqa). Under the supervision of a Kapıcıbaşı, they followed a lighter program of Arabic lessons, shooting practice every five days, and physical conditioning similar to that of the acemi oğlan elsewhere in the Ottoman world.

Veterans eski yoldaşlar kept up regular and often competitive weapons drills, shooting at distant targets with bows, javelins, and above all muskets at varied ranges and target sizes. Northern barracks trained at “Safsaf” outside Bab el Oued, especially in the weeks before April, while southern units used “Terre Rouge” near Bab Azoun. Top marksmen, often from the “Yeki” barracks, earned the nickname “shooters of silver bullets” after intensive practice at sites like Ruhba al-Fahm near Bab Azoun.

Group maneuvers almost certainly took place on open ground south of the capital, such as Manzil al-Maḥalla or Ayn al-Rabṭ, between the April camp setup and the departure for the beyliks. These grounds also hosted sports, including wrestling (kurash) and rahiya games among Janissaries. The sipahi cavalry practiced polo-like çovgan and jereed at al-Mul’ab in Ayn al-Rabṭ, regarded as elite knightly training in the Islamic world. Artillerymen, especially the local Yerliyya, trained for cannon work and aiming along the coast and near the Bab el Oued ramparts. The scholar Ibn Ḥammādūsh, who trained as a Humbaracı, is one example.

== Barracks ==
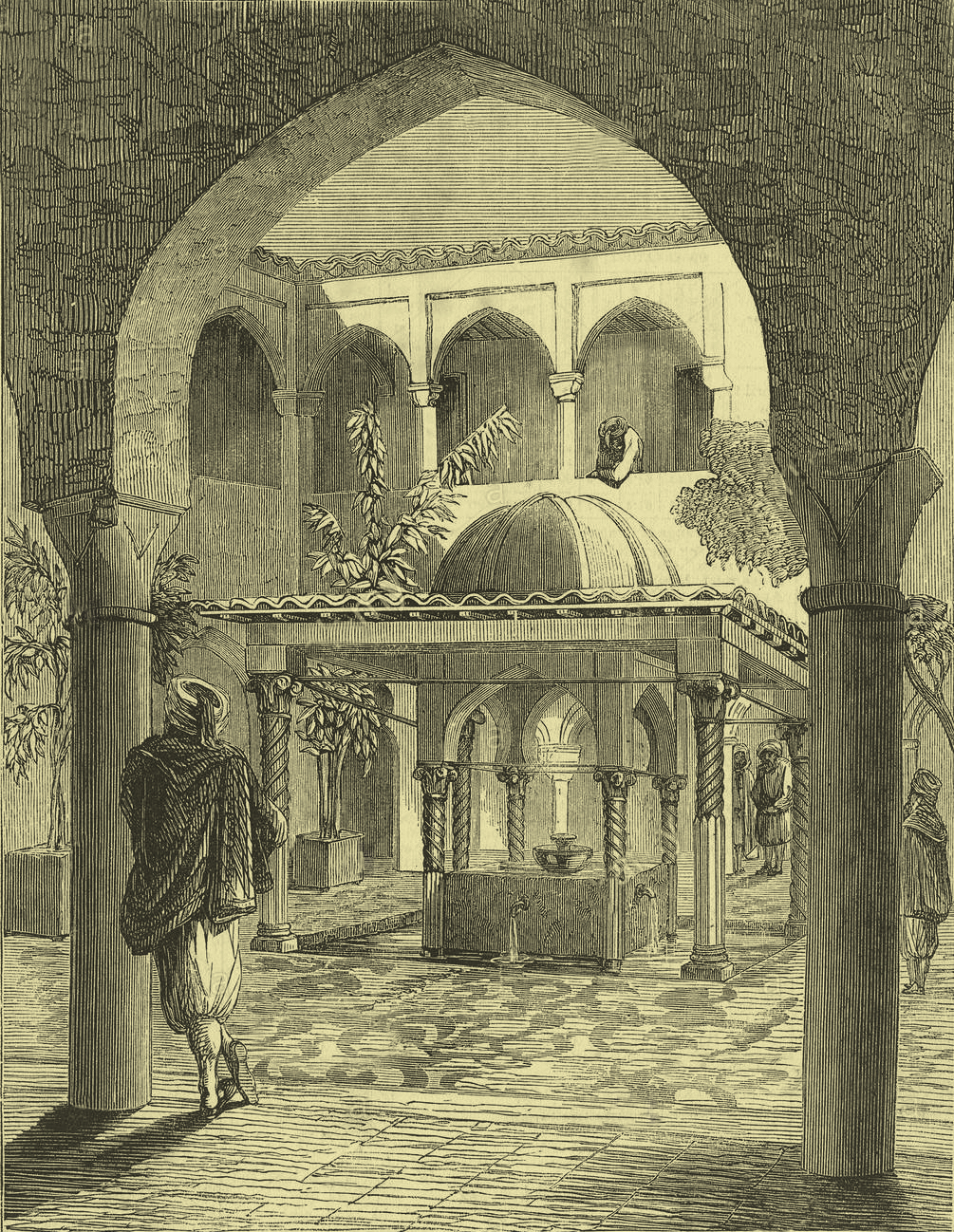
Court of the Barracks of the Janissaries in Algiers

Living commonly in large barracks just like professional armies around the world, the Janissaries of Algiers were lodged in seven or eight such barracks in Algiers, each housing around 700 and 800 all the way up to 2,000 men. As it was usual for Odjak officers to own slaves, the work required to keep the barracks in good condition was largely performed by these slaves. Hense why the Barracks had a notoriety for being nicely built, ideally organized and cleaned.

The janissaries enjoyed many advantages; they bought their food at a special price, lower than that set for the population; single ones were allowed four loaves of bread per day. They could own their barracks; those who were not married stayed in houses built on the type of Moorish house, with one room per odjak and small rooms for the boulouk bachi. In Algiers, there were eight barracks, some of which were very pretty. These barracks were much more comfortable and pleasant than anywhere else in Europe at the time. In each there was, as in the mehala, at each section, a wakil and an atchi (cook). Married janissaries lived with their families; in the 16th century, there were nearly eight hundred households in Algiers. They were also subject to a special justice, that of their officers; it included severe penalties (imprisonment, caning and even death penalty), but inflicted in private, so that the Turks would not be humiliated in front of the natives.

The Janissary pay registers kept at the National Library of Algiers mention eight barracks:

- Mouqarrir barracks (reader barracks: the muqarrir is the one who makes a communication, a presentation). It was located in the old rue Macaron. It consisted of 27 rooms, housing 899 men, trained in 48 odjak (section).
- Bab-Azoun barracks included 28 rooms and housed 1661 men trained in 63 odjak.
- Salih Pasha and Ali Pasha barracks were neighboring each other, each comprising a spacious courtyard surrounded by arcades, and dominated the port rampart. Sometimes they were designated by the name "kapılar" (the doors); also known as "Yechil Qapouda Ali Pasha" and "Yechil Qapouda Salih Pasha". They were located between rue Boza and rue de l'Aigle near Azoun. The Salih Pasha barracks included 26 rooms, where 1,266 men comprising 60 odjak were housed; that of Ali Pasha had 24 with 1516 men forming 55 odjak.
- Ousta Moussa barracks, in rue de la Marine (the French actually have the Lemercier barracks). It included 31 rooms occupied by 72 odjak with a workforce of 1833 men.
- Yali barracks, or "Bord de la Mer" located opposite the Ousta Moussa barracks, also called "Dar ed-droudj" (Stairs barracks), with 15 rooms housing 602 men divided between 27 odjak.
- Eski (old) barracks, in rue Médée, with 31 rooms bred for 60 odjak, or 1089 men.
- Yeni (new) barracks, in the same street, had only 19 rooms, with 38 odjak or 856 men.

== Command structure of the Odjak ==
=== Leadership, and commanders ===
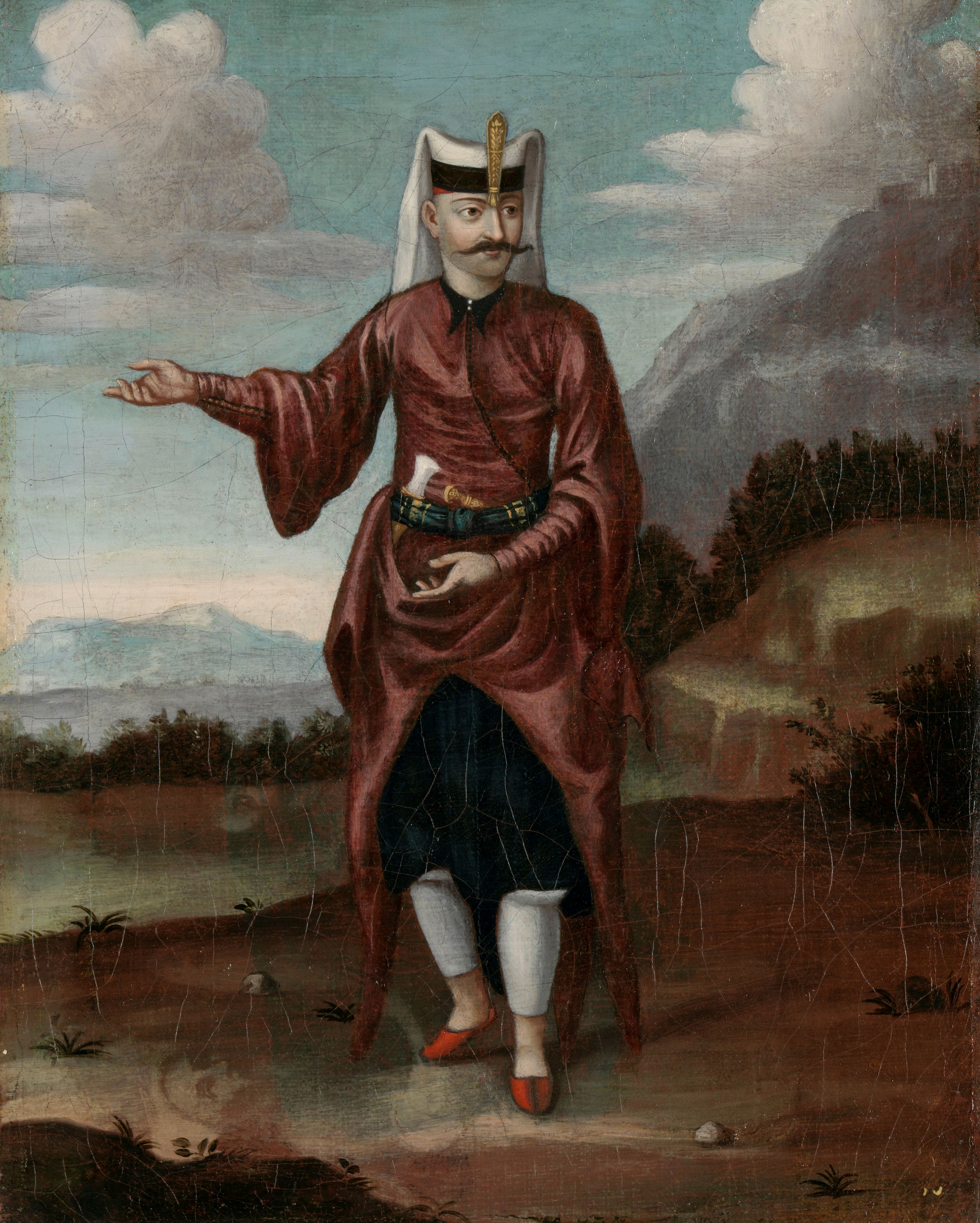
A Soldier of the Janissaries by Jean Baptiste Vanmour (1671–1737)

The command structure of the Odjak relied on several tiers of military commanders. Initially based on basic Janissary structures, after the 17th century it was slightly changed to better fit the local warfare styles and politics. The main ranks of the Odjak were:

- Agha, or marshall of the Odjak. Elected by the Odjak until 1817, after which the Dey appointed the Aghas.
- Aghabashi, which was equal to the rank of General in western armies
- Bulukbashi, or senior officer
- Odabashi, or officer
- Wakil al-Kharj, a non-commissioned officer or supply clerk
- Yoldash, or regular soldier

=== Main units ===
The army was divided into 4 regions, the exact same regions as the administrational ones (Beyliks).

- Western Army, headed by the Beys of Mascara/Oran
- Central Army, headed by the Bey of Titteri
- Eastern Army, headed by the Bey of Constantine
- Dar as-Soltan army, headed by the Dey and the Agha.

These troops were headed by the Beys, and a Khalifa (general) appointed by them. The supreme commander of the army was the Agha al-Mahalla Levying these troops was the job of the Bey. The Odjak was headed by an Agha elected by the Odjak itself. When Algiers came under attack, the Beyliks would send their troops to help the besieged city, such as in 1775 during the Spanish Invasion of Algiers. As the Beys were regional commanders, they also fought the wars in their own region, occasionally reinforced by troops from the Dar as-Soltan army. For example, in 1792, during the reconquest of Oran, the Bey Mohammed el Kebir, was the one to besiege the city using the army of the Beylik of the West, numbering up to 50,0000 with some additional reinforcements from Algiers. During the Algerian-Tunisian war of 1807 the Eastern army fought against the Tunisians. Its composition was 25,000 levy warriors from Constantine, and 5,000 reinforcements from Algiers. Sub-commanders usually included powerful tribal sheiks, djouads, or qaids.

=== Janissary corsairs ===
In the early 19th century, the naval power of Algiers could fill some fourteen percent of the full size of the odjak infantry, the mehallas numbered around 2,500 janissaries, while the navy used 800 to 900 men. Thus, it was mandaory to serve on board of a corsair ship for the militia in the Algerian odjak. The ratio of janissaries aboard was not known though, it could be guessed that one janissary for three navy crews were aboard the Algerian corsair ships if the total number of sailors in this period was about 2500 men. A document on the Algerian navy in 1820 states: "each complement of ship’s personnel includes, in addition to its crew of sailors, a garrison of infantry formed from the Turkish militia, of not more than a hundred men for the frigates, and not less than forty men for the schooners and polaccas."

These soldiers assigned during the year for service at sea were taken aboard vessels that belonged to private individuals as well as those that belonged to the state. It was the new recruits who were assigned to serve at sea. They took their rifles, pistols, swords, and a blanket for sleeping; their entire equipment. The beylik provided neither bunk nor hammock nor mattress; he supplied old sheets for binding up wounds and a medicine chest . . . [They] were not involved in ship manoeuvres; they were assigned to the musketry and to be the first to make boardings with knives and swords. Their stations were on the quarter-deck, where soldiers could not go without permission, except to serve them.

— Jean-Michel Venture de Paradis, Tunis et Alger au XVIIIe siècle

=== Spahis of Algiers ===
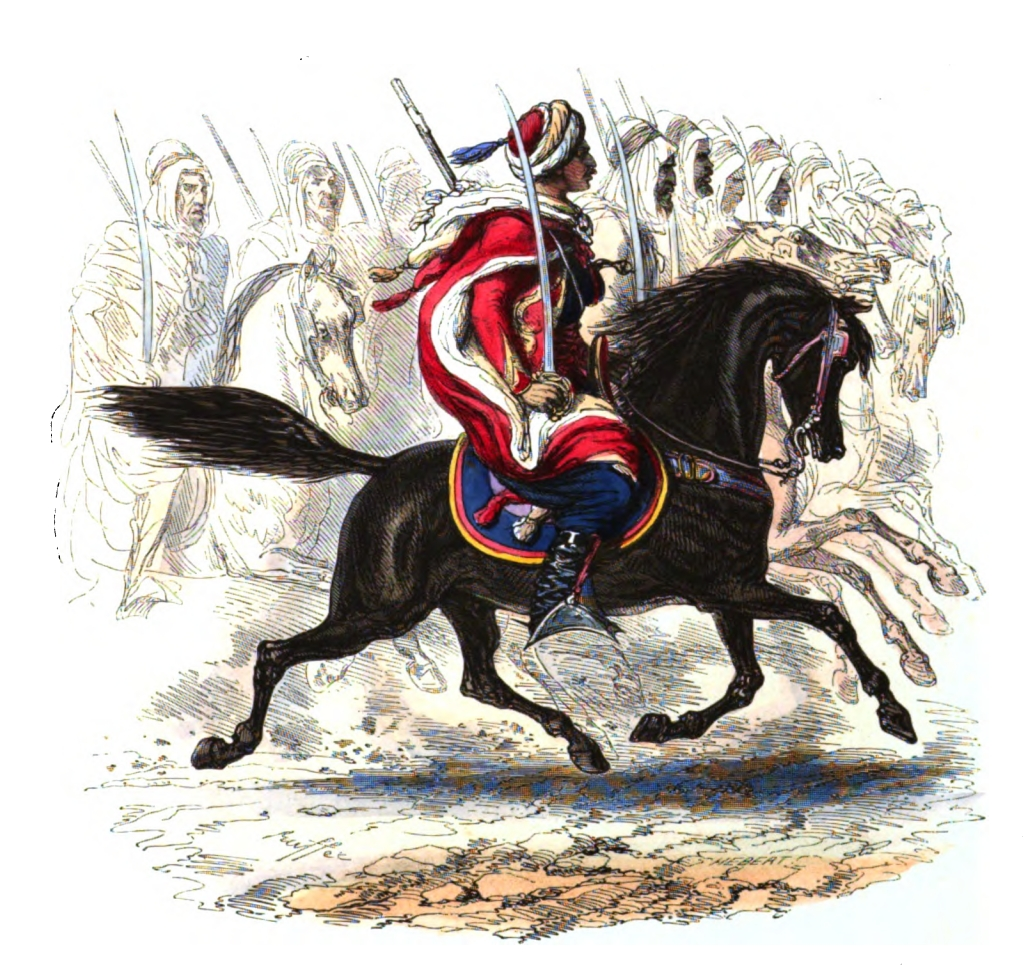
Algerian Deylikal Spahi unit

Not much is known about the spahis of Algiers, other than the fact that they were a regular standing unit, mainly composed of locals, although there were Turks amongst them. They differed greatly from the traditional Ottoman sipahis, in both military equipment and organization, and hardly had anything in common with them other than their names, and both being cavalry units. The Dey also periodically had several thousand spahis in his service acting as a personal guard. Other than the Dey's guard, Spahis were not recruited or stationed in Algiers, instead being usually recruited by the Beys. They were usually more organized than the irregular tribal cavalry, although far less numerous.

The French Spahi units were based on the Algerian spahis, and they were both mainly light cavalry.

=== Levy warriors ===
The levy militia composed from Arab-Berber warriors numbered in the tens of thousands, being overwhelmingly the largest part of the Algerian army. They were called upon from loyal tribes and clans, usually Makhzen ones. They numbered up to 50,000 in the Beylik of Oran alone. The troops were armed with muskets, usually moukahlas, and swords, usually either Nimchas or Flyssas, both of which were traditional local swords. The weaponry wasn't supplied by the state, and instead it was self-supplied. As nearly every peasant and tribesman owned a musket, it was expected from the soldiers to be equipped with one. As many of these tribes were traditionally warrior ones, many of these troops were trained since childhood, and thus were relatively effective especially in swordsmanship, albeit they were hampered by their weak organization, and by the 19th century their muskets became outdated.

=== Modern style units ===
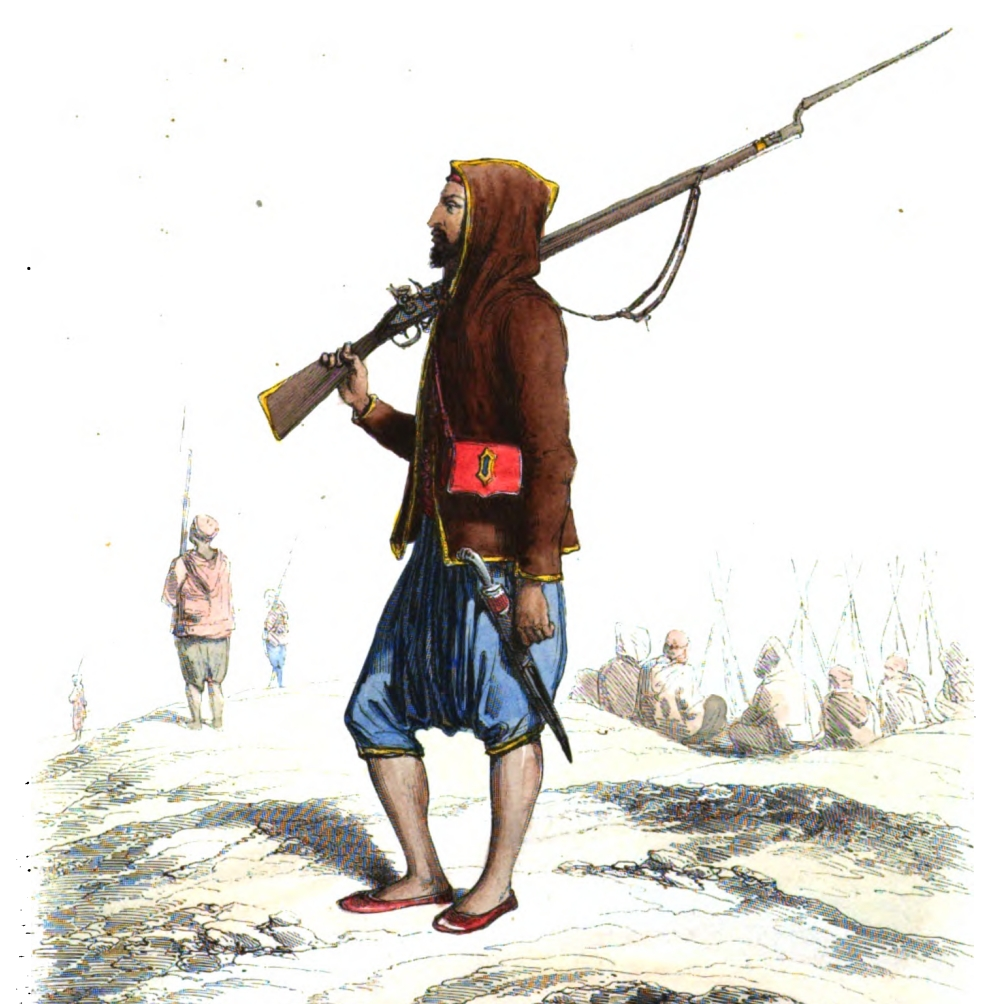
Algerian Zwawa infantry in early 19th century

Algiers hardly possessed units based on Napoleonic or post-Napoleonic warfare, and many of their units, including the Odjak of Algiers were organized on outdated 17th and 18th century Ottoman standards. The only two main units which existed as Modern-style units were the small Zwawa guard established by Ali Khodja Dey in 1817 to counter-balance the influence of the Odjak, and the small army of Ahmed Bey ben Mohamed Chérif, the last Bey of Constantine, who organized his army on the lines of Muhammad Ali's Egyptian Army. Ahmed Bey's army was composed of 2,000 infantry, and 1,500 cavalry. His entire army was composed of native Algerians, and he also built a complex system of manufactories to support the army and invited several foreigners to train technicians and other specialists.

== Sources ==
- Boyer, P. (1970b). "Des Pachas Triennaux à la révolution d'Ali Khodja Dey (1571-1817)" [From the Triennial Pachas to the Ali Khodja Dey revolution (1571-1817)]. Revue Historique (in French). 244 (1 (495)). Paris: 99–124. ISSN 0035-3264. JSTOR 40951507. OCLC 9972734185.
- Boyer, Pierre (1973). "La révolution dite des "Aghas" dans la régence d'Alger (1659-1671)" [The "Agha" revolution in the Regency of Algiers]. Revue des mondes musulmans et de la Méditerranée (in French). 13 (1). Marseille: 168–169. doi:10.3406/remmm.1973.1200. eISSN 2105-2271. OCLC 4649479082.
- Hamdan-Ben-Othman-Khoja (July 2016) [1833]. Aperçu Historique Et Statistique Sur La Régence d'Alger, Intitulé En Arabe: Le Miroir (in French). Hachette Livre. ISBN 978-2-01-371914-8.
- ibn Bekir, Mohamed [in French] (1860) [10 May 1749 (23 Jumada al-Ula 1162)]. "Ahad Aman ou réglement politique et militaire" [Ahad Aman or political and military regulations]. Revue africaine (in French). 4 (21). Translated by ben Moustafa, Mohammad; Devoulx, Albert. Algiers: Société historique algérienne: 211–219.
- Isichei, Elizabeth (1997). A history of African societies to 1870. Cambridge: Cambridge University Press. ISBN 0-521-45444-1. OCLC 604112613.
- Kaddache, Mahfoud (2003). L'Algérie des Algériens de la préhistoire à 1954 [Algeria of the Algerians: Prehistory to 1954] (in French). Paris-Méditerranée. ISBN 978-2-84272-166-4.
- Khoja, Hamdan Ben-Othman (July 2016) [1833]. Aperçu Historique Et Statistique Sur La Régence d'Alger, Intitulé En Arabe: Le Miroir (in French). Vanves, Paris: Hachette Livre. ISBN 978-2-01-371914-8. OCLC 1304515544.
- Mahrez, Amine (2021). The Janissary corps in the Regency of Algiers during the reign of the Deys (1671-1830 AD) (PhD thesis). Abu Al-Qasim Saadallah University - Algiers 2.
- Merouche, Lemnouar (2007). Recherches sur l'Algérie à l'époque ottomane II: La course, mythes et réalités [Research on Algeria in the Ottoman period II: The Corso, Myths and Realities]. Bibliothèque d'histoire du Maghreb (in French). Paris: Éditions Bouchène. ISBN 978-2-912946-95-9. OCLC 51843745.
- M'Hamsadji, Kaddour (2005). Sultân Djezâı̈r: aux origines historiques des janissaires d'Alger [Sultan Djezair: At the Historic Origins of the Janissaries of Algiers] (in French). Algiers: Office des publications universitaires. ISBN 978-9961-0-0811-9. OCLC 62179274.
- Rinehart, Robert (1985). "Chapter 1". In Nelson, Harold D. (ed.). Algeria, A Country Study. Area handbook series, 550-44 (4th ed.). Washington DC: Foreign Area Studies, American University. LCCN 94043019. OCLC 13268869.
- Spencer, William (1976). Algiers in the Age of the Corsairs. Centers of civilization series. Norman, Oklahoma: University of Oklahoma Press. ISBN 978-0-8061-1334-0. OCLC 1958266.
- Wolf, John Baptiste (1979). The Barbary Coast: Algiers under the Turks, 1500 to 1830. New York, NY: Norton. ISBN 978-0-393-01205-7. OCLC 4805123.
