= Usta Murad Mosque =

Mosque in Tunis, Tunisia

- مسجد اسطا مراد

Religion
- Affiliation: Islam
- Branch/tradition: Sunni

Location
- Location: Tunis, Tunisia

Architecture
- Type: Mosque

Usta Murad Mosque (Arabic: مسجد اسطا مراد), was a Tunisian mosque located in the medina of Tunis. It does not exist anymore.

== Localization ==
The mosque was located in El Hokam Street (Arabic: نهج الحكام).

== Etymology ==
It got its name from its founder, the Muradid Dey Usta Murad who founded the Ghar el Melh harbor Porto Farina.

== History ==
The mosque was built between 1637 and 1640, which was the Usta Murad's reign period.
