= Deys of Tunis =

The Dey of Tunis (Arabic: داي تونس) was the military commander of the janissaries in the regency of Tunis. In the seventeenth century the holders of the position exercised varying degrees of power, often near-absolute. Until 1591 the Dey was appointed by the Ottoman governor (“Pasha”). In 1673 the Dey and the janissaries revolted against Murad II Bey and were defeated. After this the hereditary position of Bey was pre-eminent in Tunis. The position of Dey continued to exist until it was abolished by Sadok Bey in 1860.

== Revolution ==
The regime of the Deys emerged in 1591 after the rebellion of the janissaries against their senior officers and the Ottoman Pasha. Political authority, vested since 1574 in a Pasha sent from Istanbul, was exercised after 1591 by an officer of the Turkish militia who was given the honorific title of Dey (maternal uncle) and chosen by the dîwân al-'askar (military council). This group became a self-perpetuating body over time, drawing in soldiers of fortune from Turkey as well as European converts to Islam. After 1591 the Pasha retained nominal preeminence in recognition of the sovereignty of the Ottoman Sultan. Nevertheless the Deys lived and occupied offices in the kasbah. Like the deys of Algiers, they had almost absolute power over the regency from 1593 to 1647, until the death of Ahmed Khodja Dey.

== Religious practices ==
The Deys preserved the supremacy of the Hanafi over the local Maliki school of jurisprudence, thereby affirming the Ottoman caliph's sovereignty. The Hanafi qadi sent from Istanbul was recognised as the supreme judge, whose endorsement was required in the verdicts reached by Maliki qadis. The first call for prayer in Tunis was also made from the Hanafi Kasbah mosque, taken over from the Maliki authorities. From the reign of Yûsuf Dey, the Deys promoted religious and legal learning amongst the Turks, but most of the Hanafi scholars in the seventeenth and eighteenth centuries had Maliki teachers, and the Hanafi muftîs needed the help of their Maliki colleagues in dealing with complex legal questions.

== Loss of authority to the beys ==
The Deys also established the new office of Bey in Tunis. This official’s task was originally to assert the authority of the Deys in the interior, commanding a column of troops that toured the country levying the taxes and putting down rebellion. The position acquired greater authority after it became hereditary under the Muradid dynasty. By recruiting local troops and controlling tax revenue, the beys gradually became a new centre of political authority. While the Deys remained the official rulers, by the later seventeenth century they had little authority beyond the capital. The Beys were eventually able to determine the dîwân al-'askar’s choice of new Deys. After Murad I the Beys were born in Tunisia and came to be looked upon by the local population as an indigenous authority. The Deys made various attempts to bring them back under their control; the last of which, in 1702, saw Ibrâhîm ash-Sharîf, kill the last Muradid Bey and proclaim himself both Dey and Bey. However rather than restoring authority to the Deyship, this paved the way for the Husaynid dynasty to take power, leading to its final eclipse.

== List of Deys of Tunis ==
A complete list of the Deys of Tunis is as follows:

=== Deys of the period of Ottoman direct rule ===
- Ibrahim Roudesli (janissary from Rhodes), elected in 1591, resigned in 1593
- Moussa Dey, in office only a few months in office, 1593
- Uthman Dey (1593-1610), reigned during a period of calm and prosperity, during which he welcomed Andalusian refugees and created the post of bey.

=== Deys of the Muradid period ===
- Yusuf Dey (1610-1637)
- Usta Murad (1637-1640), Italian renegade and privateer who founded Porto Farina, one of the main corsair ports of the regency
- fr:Ahmed Khodja (1640-1647)
- Hadj Mohamed Laz Dey (1647-1653), from the Black Sea Laz people, founder of the Laz Mosque
- Hadj Mustapha Laz Dey (1653-1665), married the adopted daughter of Hammuda Pasha Bey
- Mustapha Kara Kuz (1665-1666), deposed by Murad II Bey for having wanted to restore the power of the deys
- Mohammed Hadj Oghli (1666-1669), deposed for senility;
- Chaabane Khodja (1669-1672), removed for conspiracy against Murad II Bey
- Mohamed Mantecholi (1672-1673), imposed by Murad II Bey but deposed by the militia in his absence
- Ali Laz Dey (1673), elected by the militia to counter Murad II Bey but exiled to Hammamet after the latter's return and the repression of the revolt
- Hadj Mami Jemal Dey (1673-1677), abdicated under pressure from the janissaries
- Ouzzoun Ahmed Dey (1673), remained in power for three days and subsequently died of strangulation for having participated in the intrigues around the succession of Murad II Bey;
- Mohamed Tabak Dey (1673-1682), created the first regiment of hamba (cavalry of the Turkish militia); strangled on the road to Porto Farina by the Muradid Ali Bey for having compromised with his rival Mohamed Bey
- Ahmed Chelebi (1682-1686), dey loyal to Istanbul, opposed by the Muradids
- Baqtach Khodja Dey (1686-1688), submitted to the Muradid Mohamed Bey and died quietly in his bed
- Ali Raïs (1688-1694), former privateer who abdicated and retired to live a pleasant retirement
- Ibrahim Khodja Dey (1694), tried to resist the revolt of Ben Cheker, supported by the militia of Algiers at war against the Muradids, but exiled in Sousse by Ben Cheker when he entered the capital
- Mohamed Tatar Dey (1694), appointed by Ben Cheker and lynched by the population of Tunis during Mohamed Bey's crushing victory against Ben Cheker and his allies near Kairouan
- Yaacoub Dey (1695), retired because of his great age
- Mohamed Khodja Dey (1695-1699), deposed
- Mohamed Dali Dey (1699-1701), loyal to Murad III Bey, brutal like his master, commended Tunis while the Bey led a punitive expedition against Constantine
- Mohamed Kahouaji (1701-1702), former coffee maker appointed by Murad III Bey but deposed by Ibrahim Cherif
- Kara Mustapha Dey (1702), quickly deposed by Ibrahim Cherif
- Ibrahim Cherif (1702-1705), elected dey after being recognized as bey by the diwan.

=== Deys of the Husseinid period ===
With a reduced role, the deys of the Husseinite period became senior officials appointed by the bey; they played a judicial role and served as head of the Tunis police. They also periodically presided over the court of the Driba which held its sessions in the entrance hall of the palace of the dey, the Dar Daouletli in the rue Sidi Ben Arous and hence were referred to as “daoulatli”. They were all recruited from the senior officers of the Turkish militia in Tunis.

- fr:Mohamed Khodja El Asfar (1705-1706), known as Mohamed the Blond, former secretary of the diwan, supported Hussein Bey during his seizure of power, then rebelled against his authority and was executed a few months later
- Kara Mustapha Dey (1706-1726) appointed by Hussein Bey, imam of the Bardo mosque
- Hadj Ali Dey (1726-1739)
- Hadj Mahmoud Dey (1739-1744)
- Omar Dey (1744-1748)
- Haydar Dey (1748-1752)
- Abdallah Bulukbachi (1752)
- Ali Mallamali (1752-1755)
- Mohamed Qazdaghli (1755-1758)
- Hassan El Murali (1758-1761)
- Hadj Hassan Ben Sidi Brahim El Bahli (1761-1771)
- Mustapha Zaghwani Bulukbachi (1771-1782)
- Hassan Dey (1781-1785)
- Ibrahim Bouchnaq (1785-1805)
- Kara Burni (1805-1808)
- Ahmed El Bawandi (1808-1821)
- Fidi Dey (1821-1823)
- Baba Omar Dey (1823-1832)
- Hassan Dey (1832)
- Mustapha Dey El Tarabulsi (1832-1842)
- Bach Hamba Ahmed (1842 -?)
- Kshuk Mohamed (? - 1860), originally from Albania, he was a naval officer and ambassador before becoming the last dey of Tunis; Ahmed Bey granted him the title of ouzir al tanfidh, executive minister, in charge of the city of Tunis.

== Abolition ==
Under the reign of Sadok Bey, the institution was abolished in September 1860, on the death of old Kshuk Mohamed, and replaced by the council of Zaptié or Dhabtiyé, headed by a president (raïs), to perform police functions in Tunis. This post remained until the French protectorate.

== See also ==
- Revolutions of Tunis
- List of beys of Tunis
- List of Pashas and Deys of Algiers

== Bibliography ==
- Saadaoui, Ahmed: Les Mausolées des Deys et des Beys de Tunis: Architecture et épigraphie Tunisia: Centre de Publication Universitaire, 2003
