= Souk El Ghraiyer =

Coordinates: 36.796138°N 10.168214°E

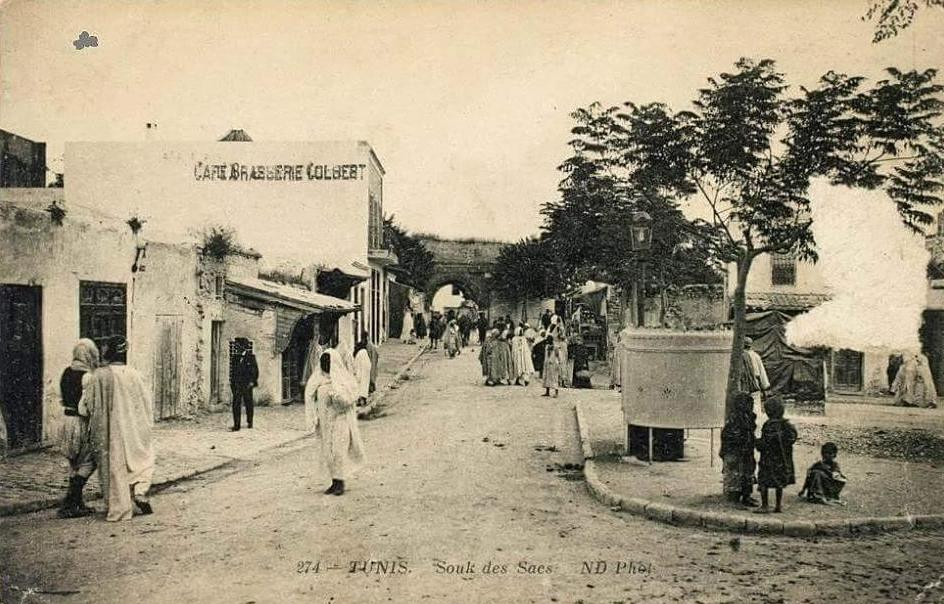
A post card with Souk El Ghraiyer

Souk El Ghraiyer was one of the souks of the medina of Tunis.

== Location ==
The souk was located in Bab Menara, near the ministry of defense and souk El Sakkajine.

== Products ==
It specialized in selling bags made of goat or camel hair.

== Evolution ==
The souk does not exist anymore. It was demolished for the extension of the military services office on April 11, 2001.
