= Usta Murad =

Usta Murad (French: Ousta Mourad; c. 1570 – June 1640) was a corsair captain and later Dey of Tunis from 1637 until his death.

== Biography ==
Born in Levanto, Liguria, he was the son of Francesco Di Rio. The chroniclers do not record whether he was captured by the Barbary pirates and sold to Uthman Dey or if he voluntarily joined the galleys of the Tunisian Beylik.

After converting to Islam, he took the name Murad (Turkish: Murat) (Note: In the Christian west, Usta Murad was known by various names: Usta Mourato, Osta Moratto, Osta Mouratto, Sta Mouratto, Stamurato, Osta Murat and Estamorat. All are variants of the original Arabic.) and began to build a comfortable position in Tunis by becoming a corsair of the beylik. An act delivered by the French consulate on 1 November 1594 indicates in effect that the "patron" of a ship from Salerno had declared himself to owe Murad 90 gold crowns. From 1600 he increasingly entered into the esteem of Uthman Dey, becoming a sort of personal secretary. In 1615, Yusuf Dey appointed him to the command of the galleys of Bizerte, a role he occupied until 1637. He had six galleys and many more small ships under his command, which roamed the Mediterranean, attacking and pillaging the coasts of Christian Europe and gaining considerable revenue and power for Tunis; There was also a war between the pirates of Tunisia and the Maltese after the Tunisians captured the husband of Agrabah Maltese and ended with the victory of the pirates of Tunisia . In 1628 he was named "supreme commander" of the Tunisian army during a short war against the Eyalet of Algeria and, although defeated, he preserved the prestige which he enjoyed thanks to his prowess.

He became wealthy enough to become the owner of a corsair fleet himself. He linked himself with several people who were important in Tunisian public life in order to improve his own affairs. As he consolidated his position he did not forget his origins or try to renounce his biological family. Initially he was rejoined by his father who, thanks to his son's intercession, became an important intermediary working with the magistrate for the redemption of slaves, an institution founded in 1597 to promote the freeing of Ligurian prisoners held by Barbary pirates. In addition to his father, he was reunited with his brothers, who maintained his business relations Genoa, Livorno and Marseille. Their enormous wealth reinforced Murad's position in the early years of the seventeenth century.

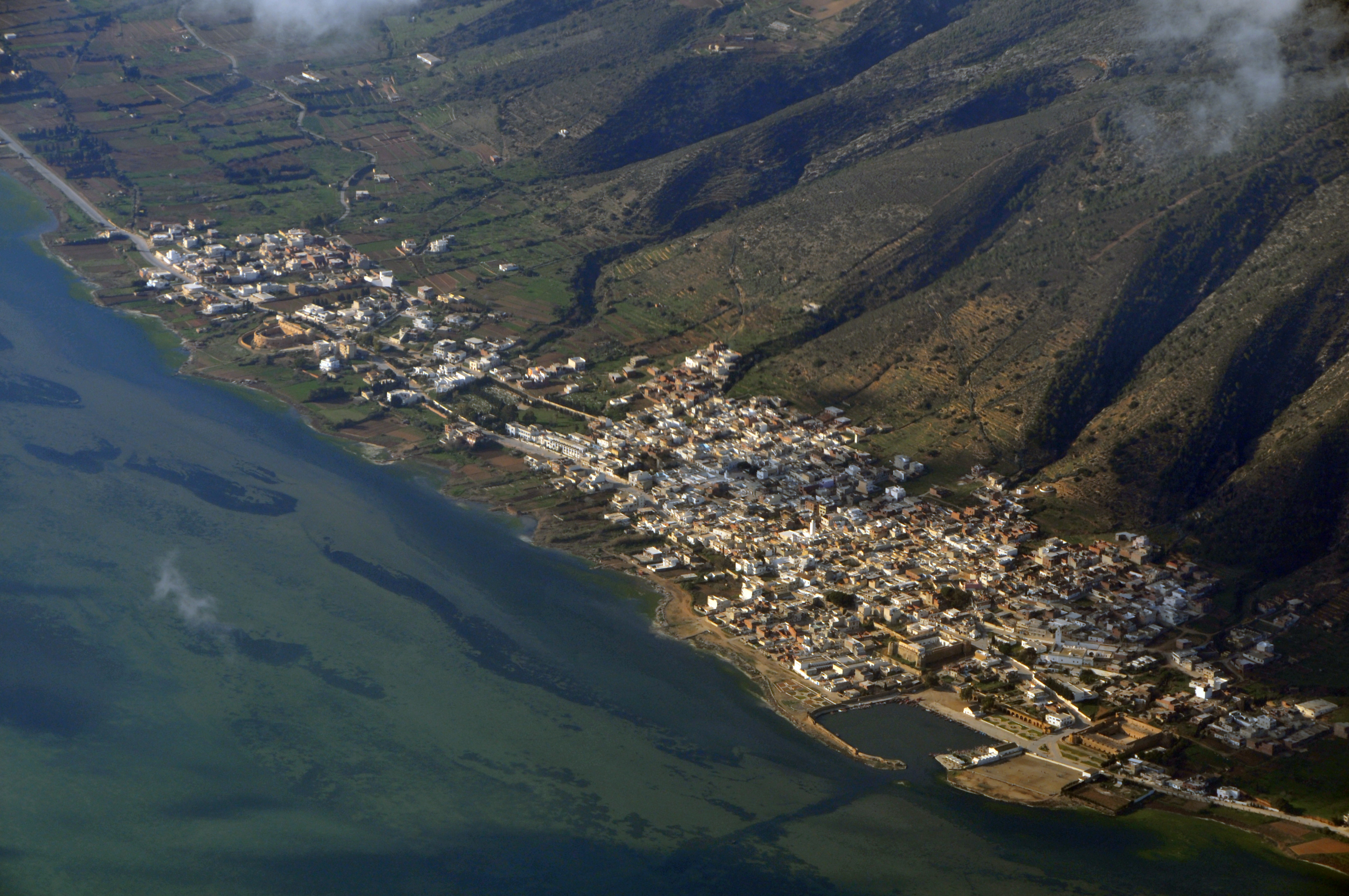
Aerial view of Ghar el-Melh and its port, founded by Usta Murad in 1638

At Yusuf Dey's death in 1637, Usta Murad took power by force, with the help of another renegade, Mami Ferrarese, whom he later eliminated, and the support of the Muradid sovereign Hammuda Pasha Bey, even though the Divan of the Turkish militia of Tunis was hostile to him because he was of foreign origin and all other Deys of Tunis had been of Turkish birth. He controlled the beylic alongside Hammuda for three years, maintaining good relations with France and expanding the corsair port of Porto Farina (later Ghar el-Melh), located at a strategic coastal site, which increasingly supplanted Bizerte. His vast house was located on the street of judges in the quarter of Tourbet el Bey, within the Medina of Tunis. He built his mausoleum on the current Bab Menara road.

His reign was cut short by his death in Tunis in June 1640. His descendants remain among the foremost families of Tunis down to the present day. His great grandson, Hammuda Stamrad was the brother-in-law and supporter of Hussayn I Bey after his deposition by Ali I Pasha in 1735. He shared the fate of his ally, being executed in the heart of the Bardo palace in 1740.

== Bibliography ==
- Marco Biagioni, Pirati nel golfo, éd. Luna editore, La Spezia, 1999 (in Italian)
