= Dar El Haddad =

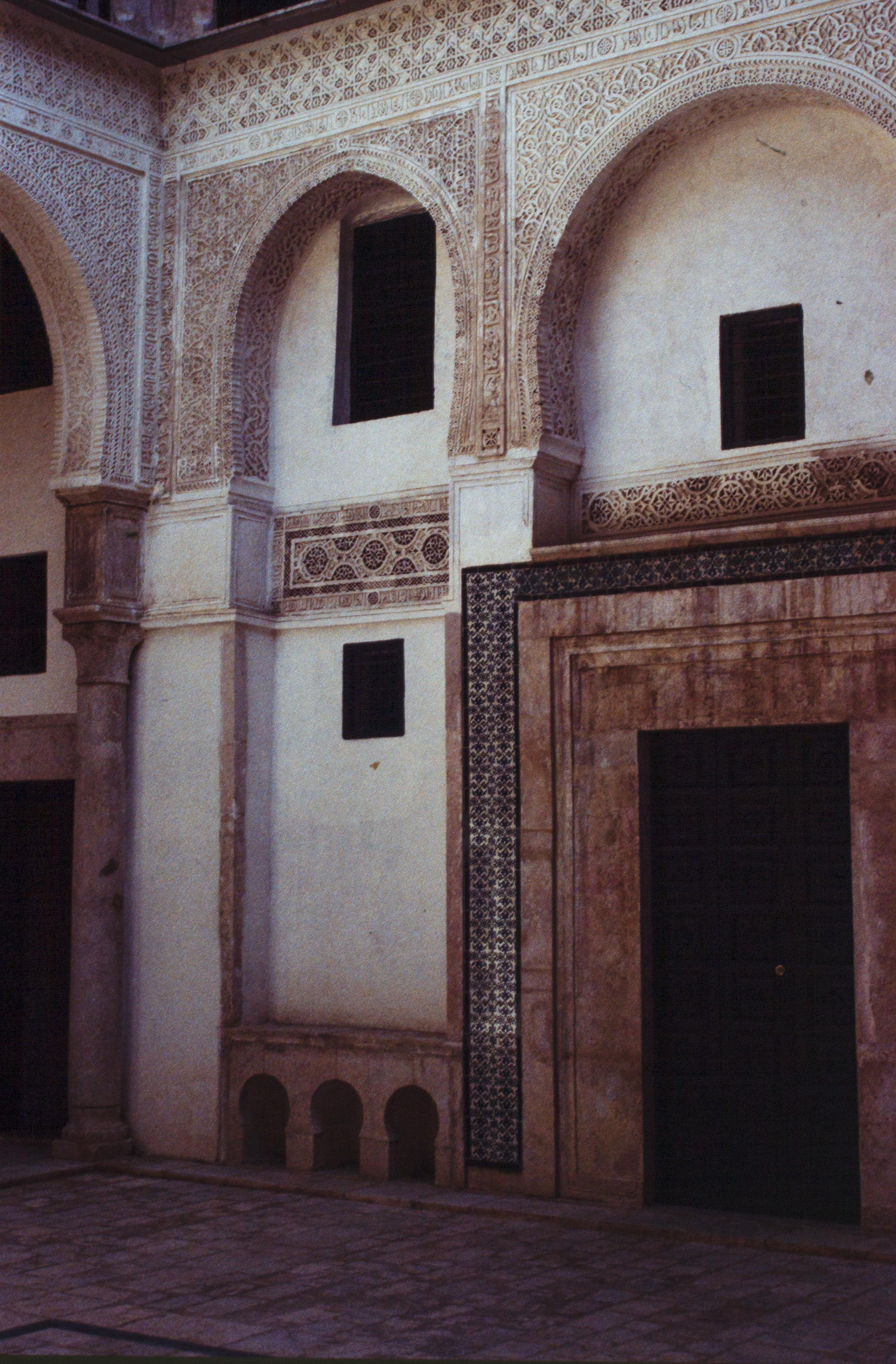
- Courtyard of Dar El Haddad
- Interactive map of the Dar El Haddad area

General information
- Type: Palace
- Architectural style: Moorish architecture Tunisian architecture
- Location: Medina of Tunis, Tunis, Tunisia
- Year built: 16th century
- Client: Saïd El Haddad

Dar El Haddad is one of the oldest palaces in the medina of Tunis.

== Localization ==
This residence is located in the Artillery dead-end, in the historical area of the Khurasanid dynasty, near Bab Menara.

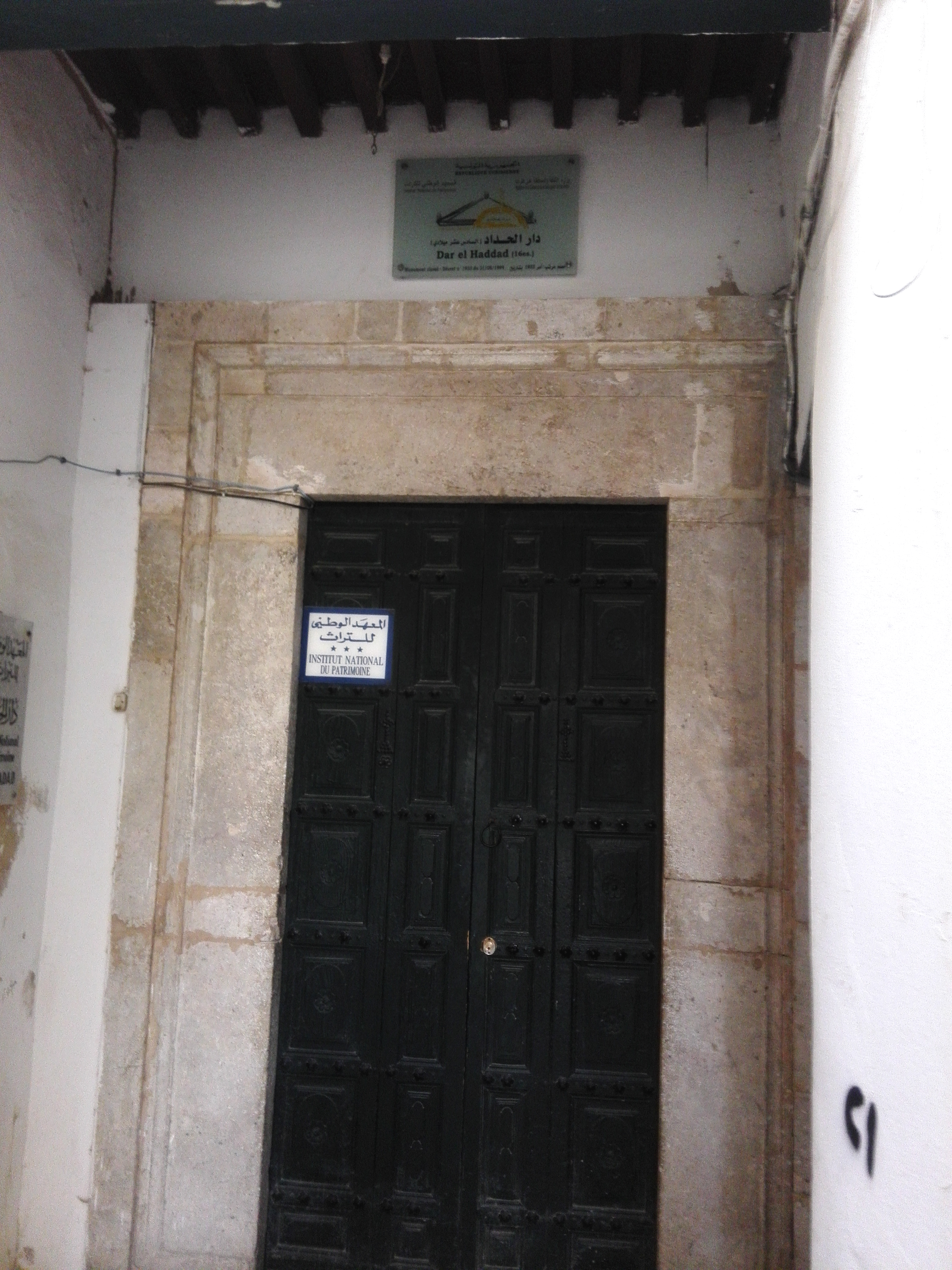
Door of the palace

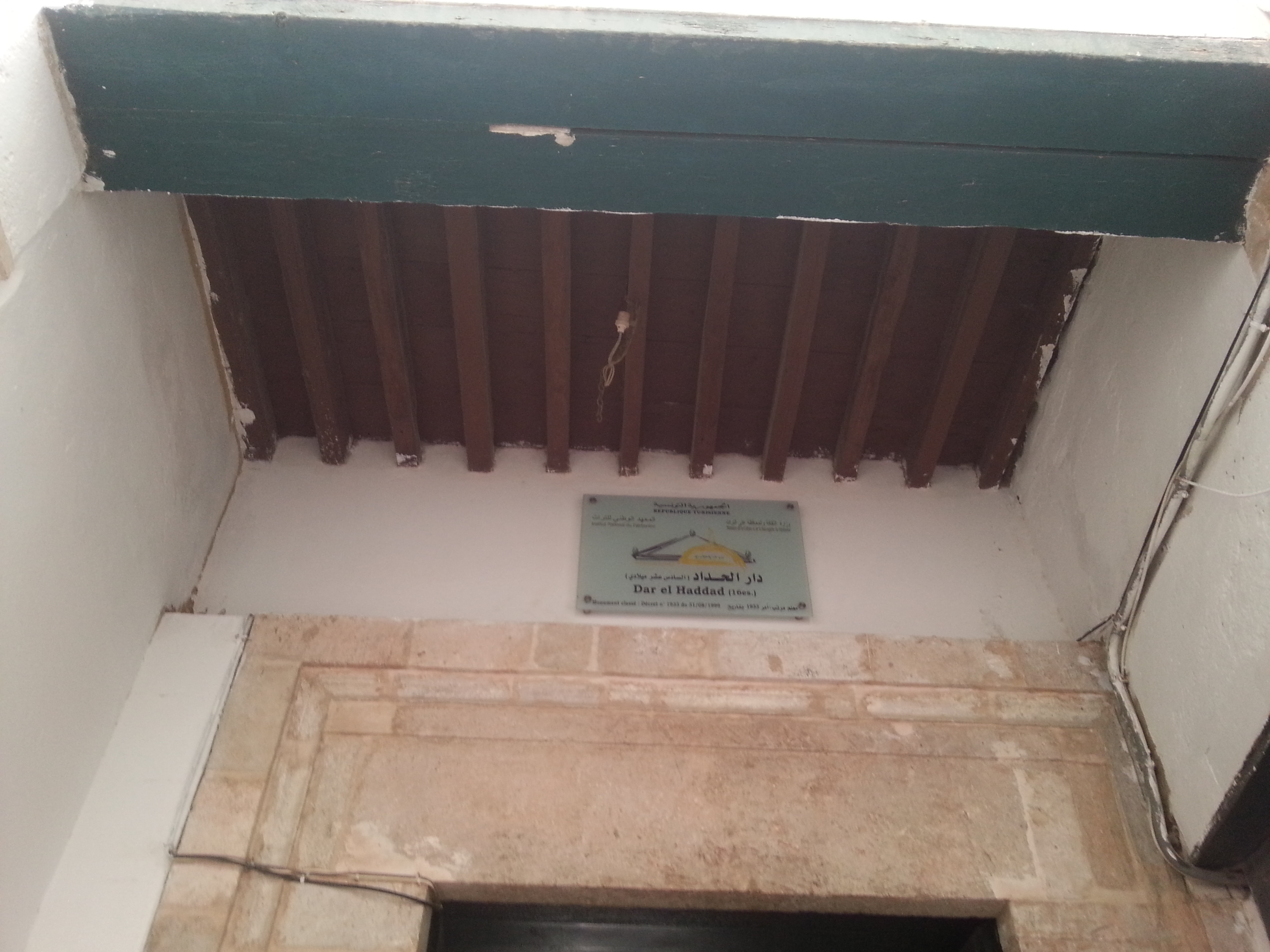
Dar El Haddad panel

== History ==
The palace was built in the 16th century by Saïd El Haddad, a wealthy chechia maker and a member of an Andalusian family settled in Tunisia. It is now owned by the municipality of Tunis. The National Heritage Institute restored it in 1999. It was classified as an historical monument during the same year.

== Architecture ==
The architecture of Dar El Haddad is quite particular compared to the other palaces of the medina. Its entrance leads to a private way reserved to the owner of the residence and his family. Three vestibules lead to the courtyard which is surrounded by porticoes in three sides.
