= Dar Othman =

Palace in Tunis

Coordinates: 36.7950°N 10.1743°E

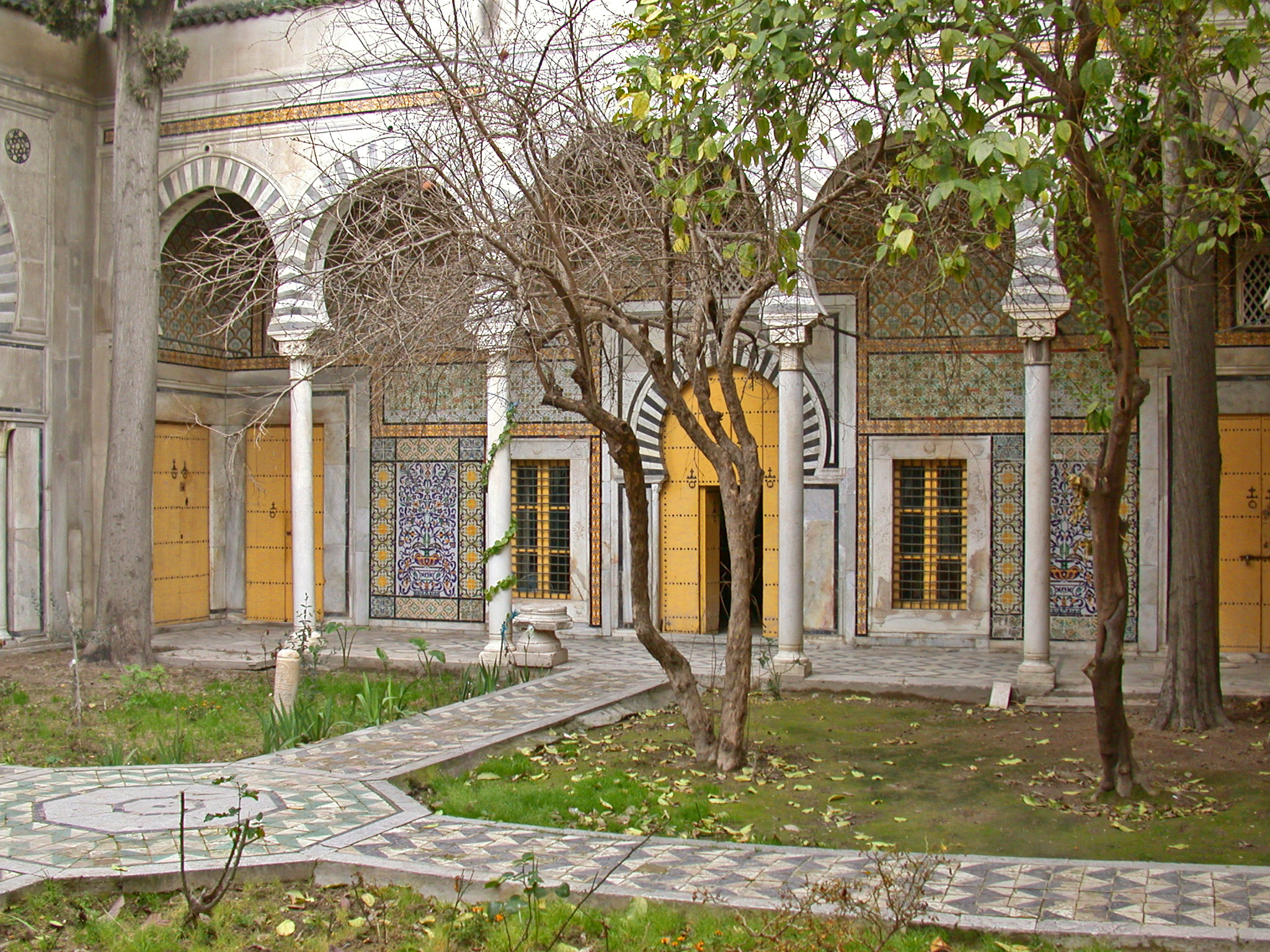
- Courtyard of Dar Othman
- Interactive map of the Dar Othman area
- Alternative names: Dar al-Oula

General information
- Type: Palace
- Architectural style: Moorish architecture Tunisian architecture Ottoman architecture
- Location: Medina of Tunis, Tunis, Tunisia
- Year built: 1594
- Client: Uthman Dey

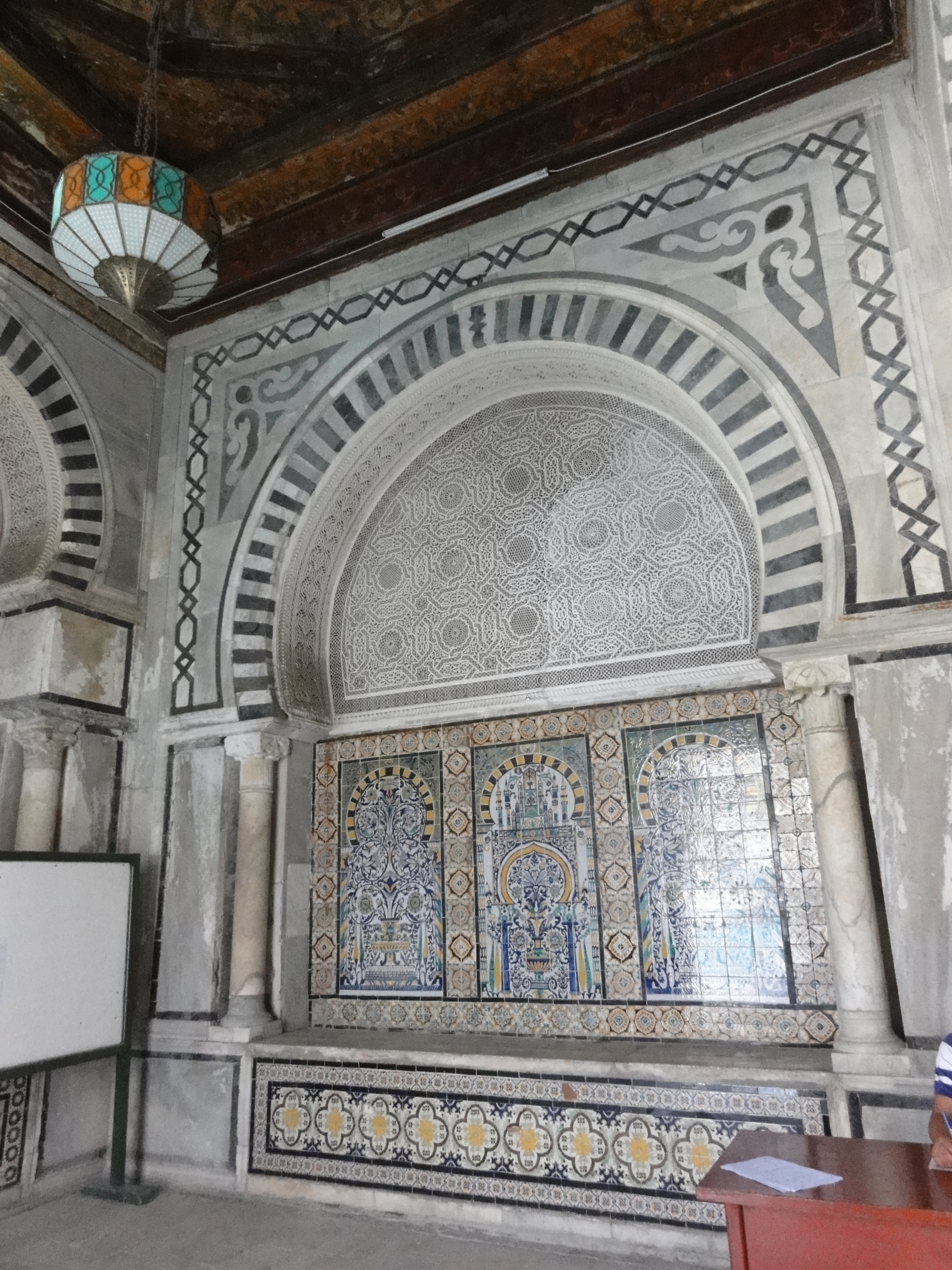
Decoration of Dar Othman

Dar Othman is one of the palaces of the medina of Tunis. The residence is located in the south of the medina, 16 El Mebazaâ Street.

== History ==
Dar Othman was built in the end of the sixteenth century (around 1595) by Othman, dey of Tunis, who reigned from 1593 to 1610. During the first half of the 19th century, Al-Husayn II ibn Mahmud transformed it into a provision's house to store supplies for soldiers staying in barracks of the neighborhood. Thus, the palace is also called Dar Al Oula (provision's house).

Afterwards, the residence was bequeathed by Muhammad III as-Sadiq to his grand vizier Mustapha Ben Ismaïl. In 1936, the palace got classified as an historical monument. It was first allocated to the National Institute of Archaeology and Art (known these days as the National Heritage Institute). Nowadays, it is the headquarters of the preservation of the medina of Tunis.

== Description ==
The facade of the residence is composed of two lintels of arch-stone separated by a pointed horseshoe arch and a wooden pergola over the door. It also has two Andalusian style columns in the lower part and two Hafsid style columns in the upper part.

The entrance door leads to a driba (square vestibule). The floor is paved with Kadhal flagstones. Walls are surrounded by stone benches. The ceiling, which rises in stages from bottom to top, is decorated with an Andalusian style stucco-work.

The vestibule leads to the courtyard which has only two porticoes (unlike the majority of the medina's palaces which are surrounded by four porticoes).

Four T-shaped rooms surround the courtyard. Each one of them contains two alcoves.

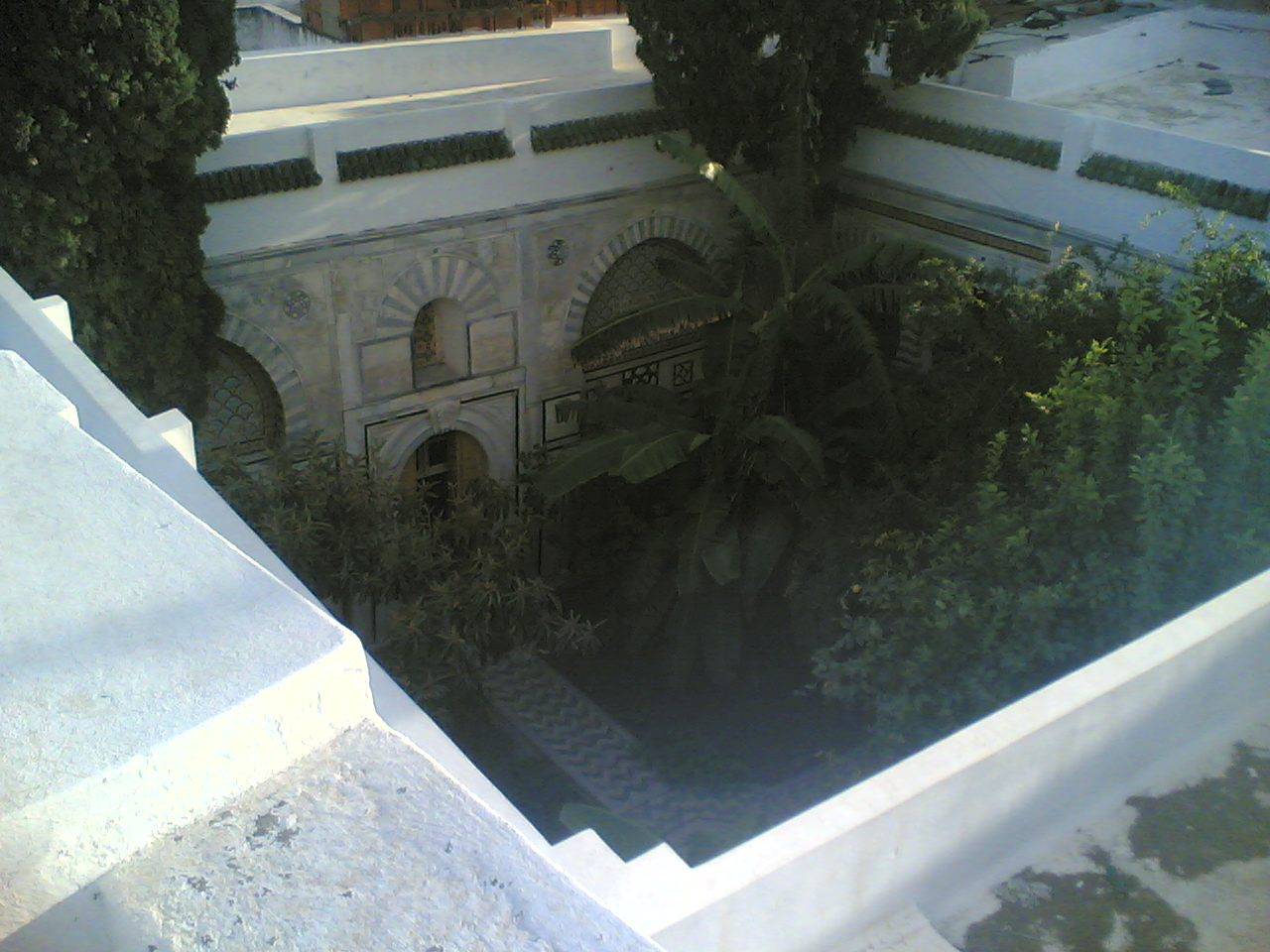
dar othman

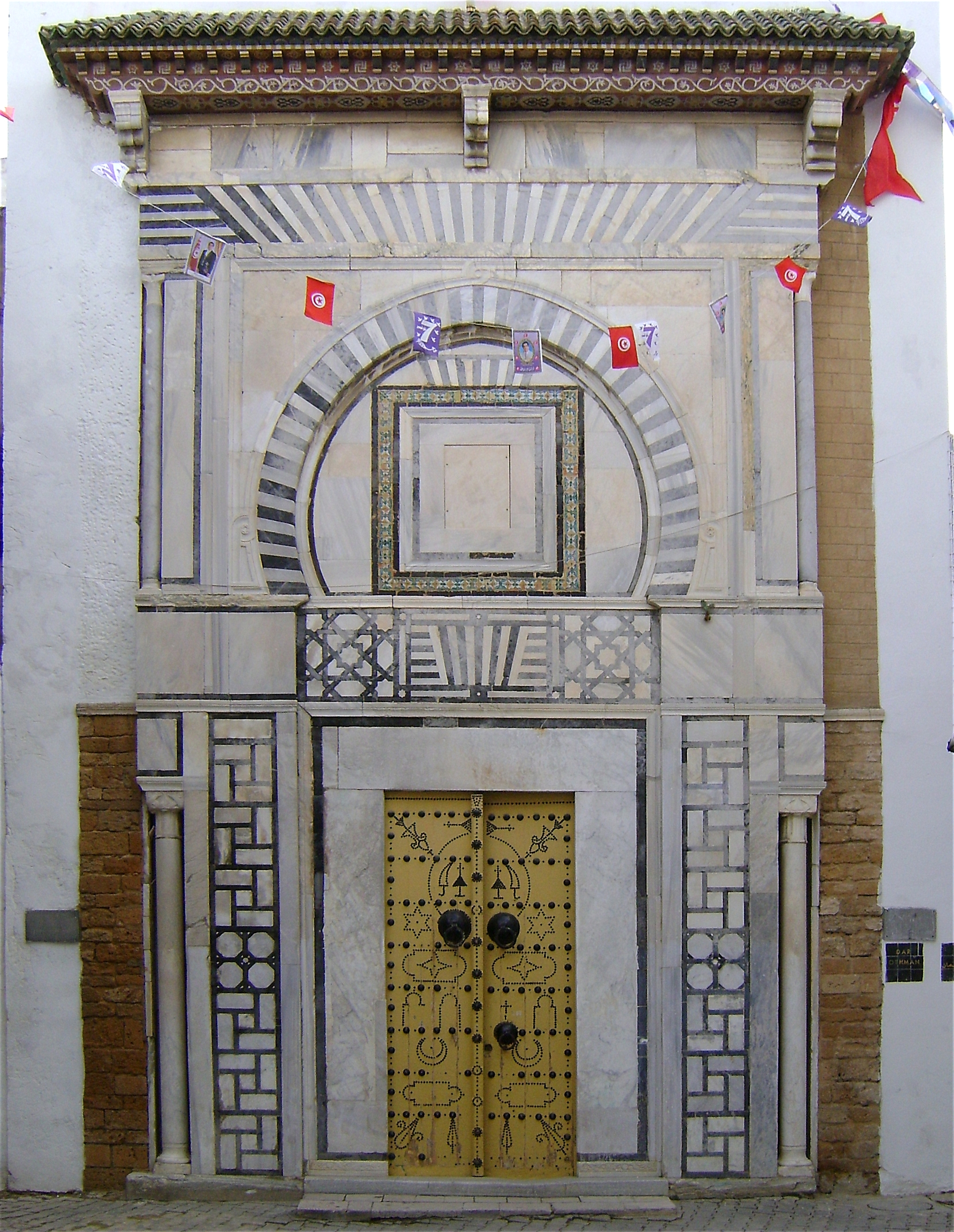
Entrance of dar othman

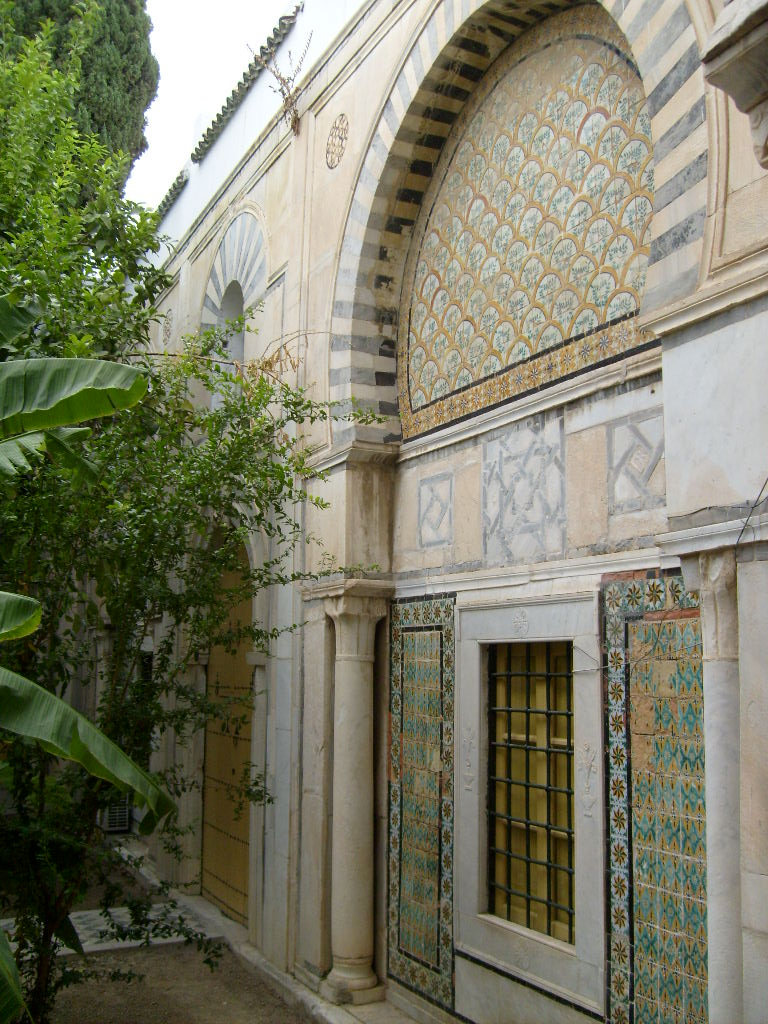
facade of Dar Othman

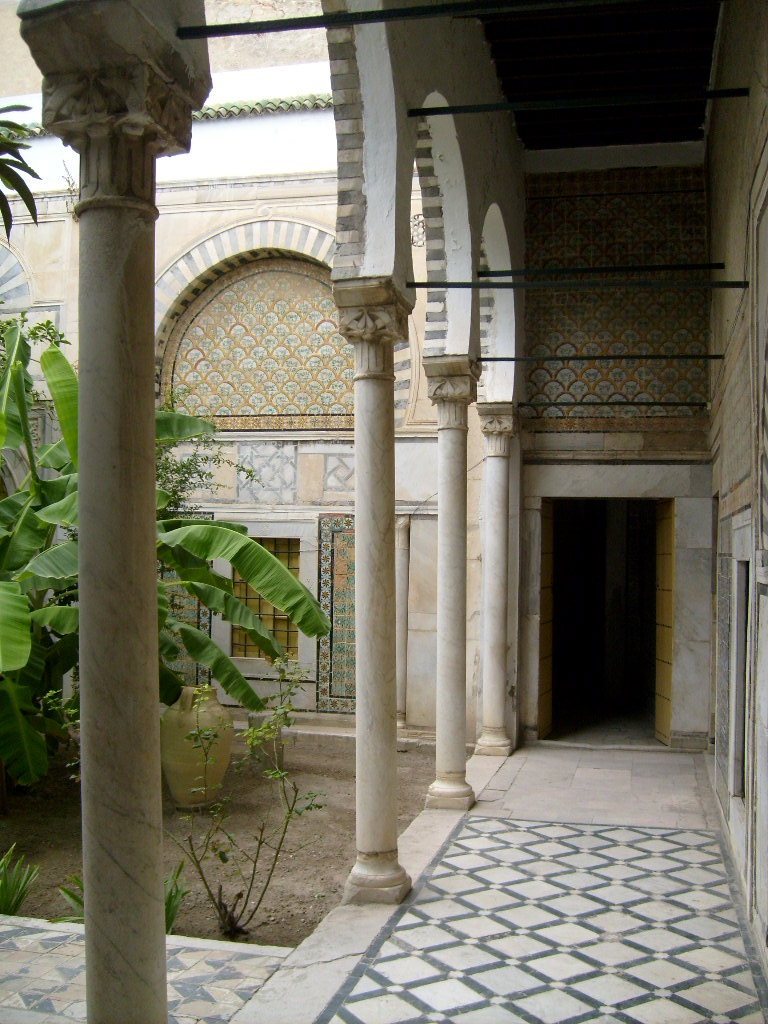
Court of Dar Othman

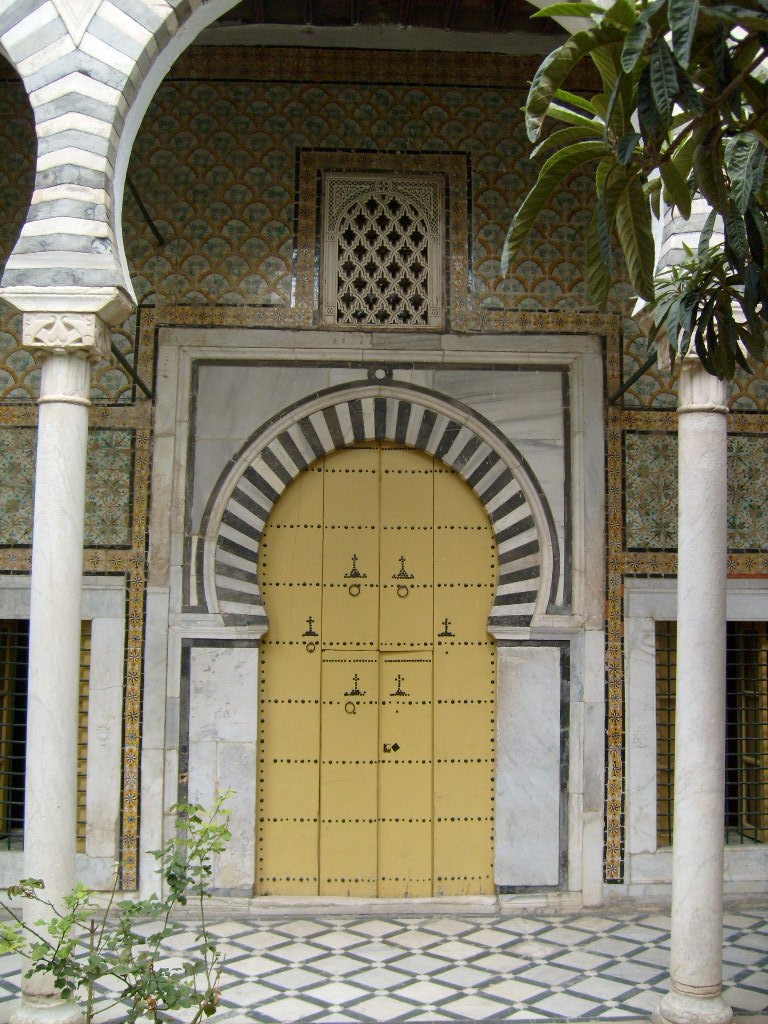
A door at Dar Othman

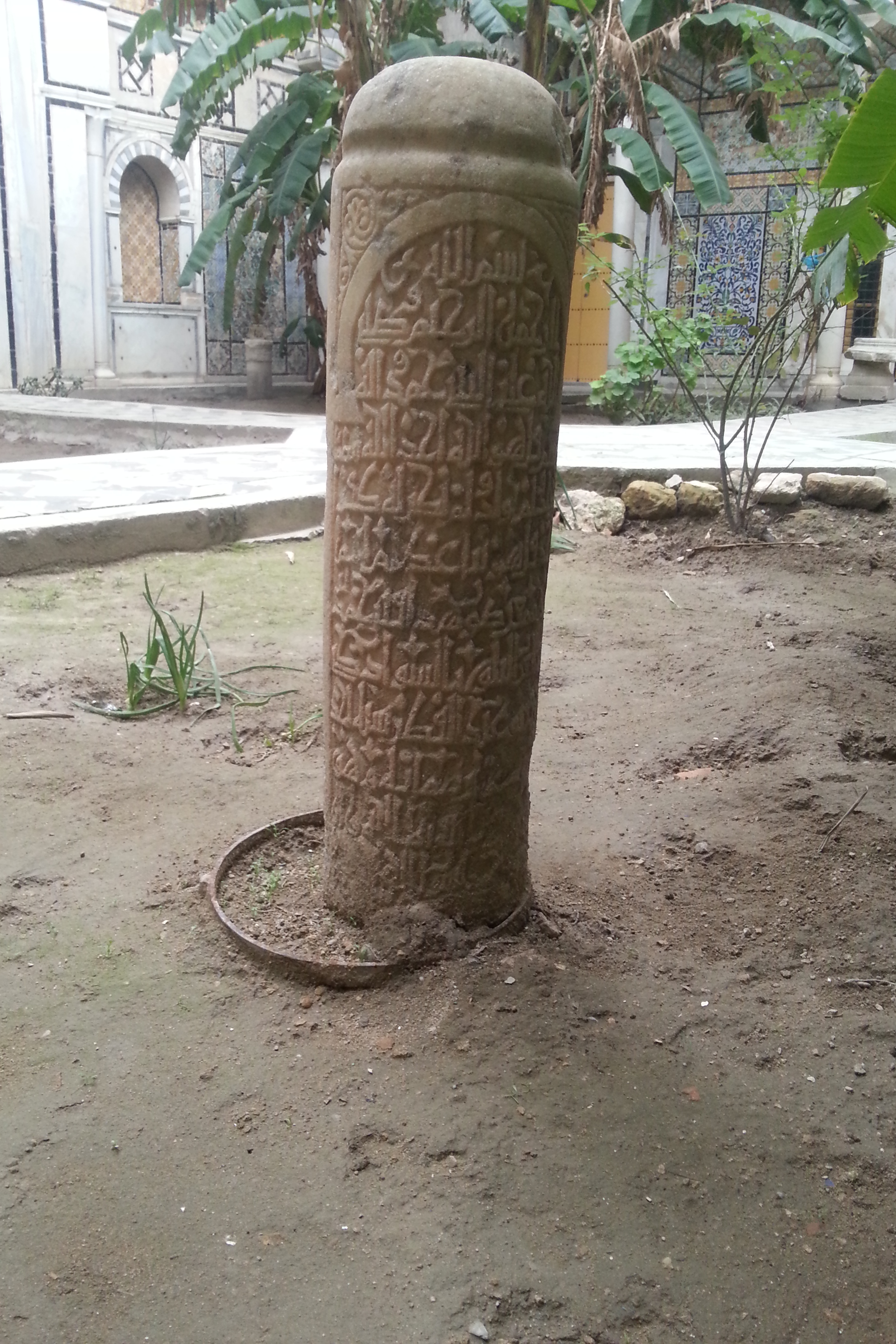
A tomb at dar Othman

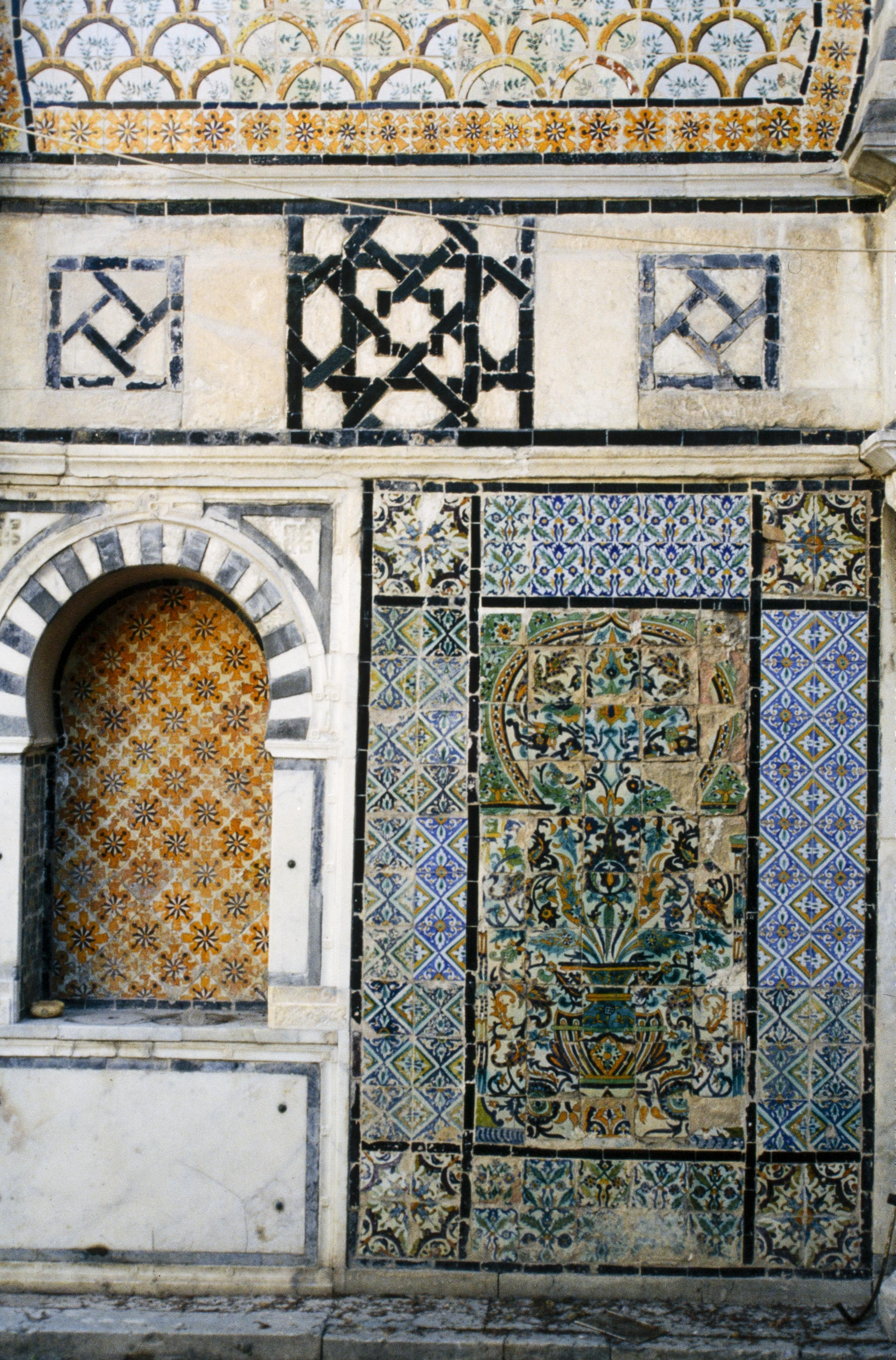
Blind arch and Ceramic tiles at Dar Othman

== Bibliography ==
- Binous, Jamila (2000). "Dar Othman". Ifriqiya, treize siècles d'art et d'architecture en Tunisie. Tunis: Démetér. pp. 77–79.
