= Yusuf Dey =

Yusuf Dey (c.1560 in Tripoli – 1637 at Tunis) was Dey of Tunis from 1610 until his death.

== Biography ==
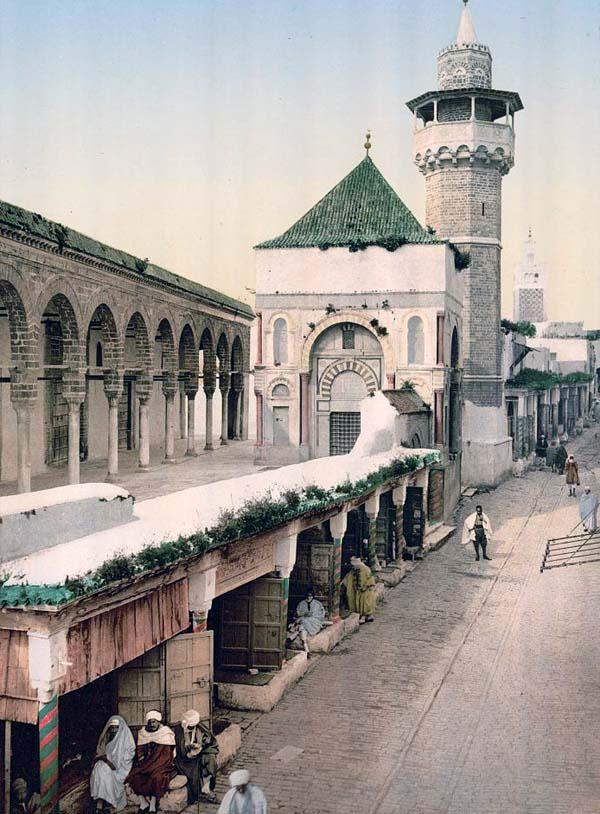
View of the entrance and minaret of the mosque of Yusuf Dey in 1899

Son of Mustapha El Turki, an Ottoman Turkish soldier stationed at Tripoli, he took up a post in the militia of Tunis. He was recognised by Uthman Dey, who appointed him to several posts and even favoured him over his own sons. Before his death, Uthman managed to convince the divan of Tunis to name Yusuf as his successor. He also married him to his daughter.

At the death of Ramadhan Bey, who had been appointed by Uthman Dey to direct the armed force which controlled the hinterland, Yusuf selected the lieutenant and mameluke of Ramadhan Bey, an Islamic convert and corsair named Murad who became the founder of the Muradid dynasty of Beys of Tunis. In addition, Yusuf Dey often conferred with his friend and principal lieutenant, Ali Thabet.

A keen builder, Yusuf Dey had the first Ottoman style mosque built, in 1616. He also had a network of Turkish souqs built around it, including the Souq Et Trouk, which was reserved for the sale of goods deriving from the activities of the corsairs and which later became the Souq of Turkish-style tailors, the Souq El-Birka, where slaves acquired from the activities of the corsairs in the Mediterranean Sea and people were bought and sold, and the Souq El-Bchamkiya, where cobblers made Turkish-style shoes called bachmaq

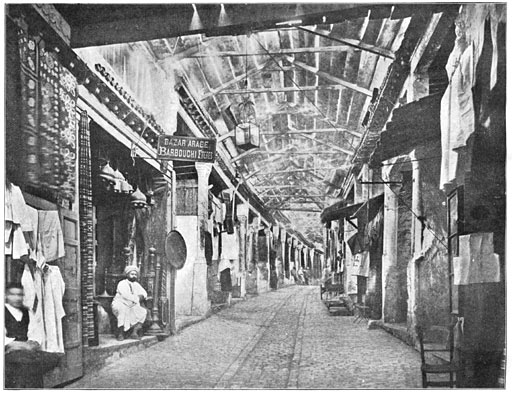
Old Souq of Turkish tailors, transformed into Souq for antiques, near Zitouna

During his tenure, he gave much attention to the question of the exact borders with the neighbouring Algeria, which was ruled by the Turkish militia of Algiers and its Dey. An initial treaty fixed the border at the Oued Serrat. Following hostilities, a more northern frontier was fixed on the Mellègue River. According to contemporary chronicles, the Turkish militia of Tunis was the strongest army in the region; it contained 9,000 elite troops (the janissaries), further regiments of irregular cavalry raised from the tribes of the hinterland, and more than 200 galleys commanded by marines and formidable corsairs.

However, as Yusuf Dey grew old, he was eclipsed little by little by the powerful personality of Hammuda Pasha Bey, son and successor of Murad I Bey, who gradually took control of the divan and the militia.

In spite of this, the elderly Yusuf Dey managed to secure the assignment of the island of Djerba to the regency of Tunis, through diplomatic efforts. To commemorate this achievement, he had a whole souq built in Tunis for merchants from Djerba.

There was also a war between the pirates of Tunisia and the Maltese after the Tunisians captured the husband of Agrabah Maltese and ended with the victory of the pirates of Tunisia.

At his death in 1637, he was interred in the Tourba which he had had built near the mosque of Yusuf Dey. The divan elected as his successor, a famous Italian renegade, who became the most famous corsair of the regency, Usta Murad.

== Bibliography ==
- Alphonse Rousseau, Annales tunisiennes ou aperçu historique sur la régence de Tunis, éd. Bastide, Alger, 1864
