= Laz Mosque =

Mosque in Tunis, Tunisia

- جامع لاز
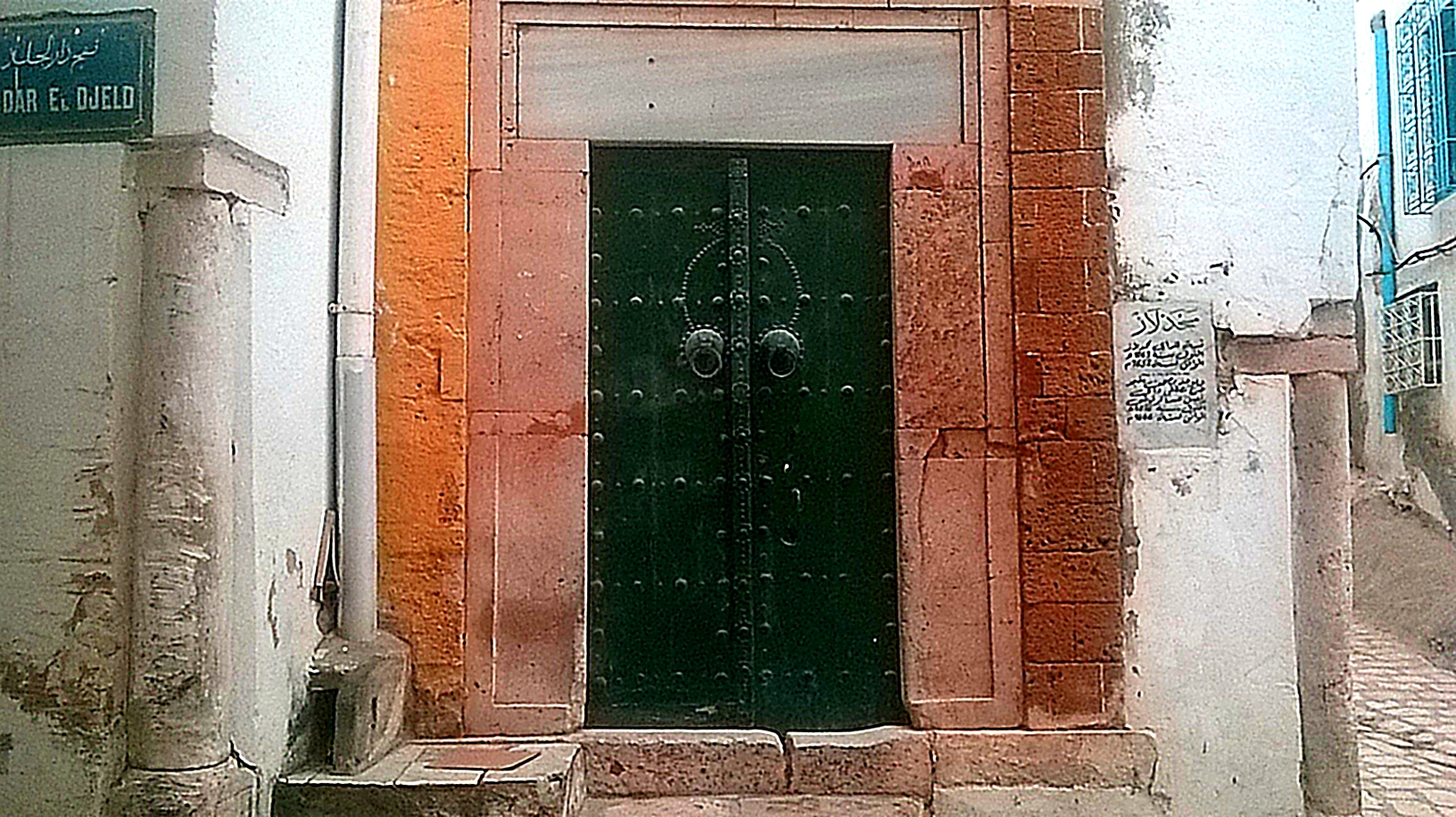

- Tunisia

Religion
- Affiliation: Islam
- Branch/tradition: Sunni

Location
- Location: Tunis, Tunisia
- Coordinates: 36.799467°N 10.168441°E

Architecture
- Type: Mosque

Laz Mosque (Arabic: جامع لاز) is a small mosque in the west of the medina of Tunis.

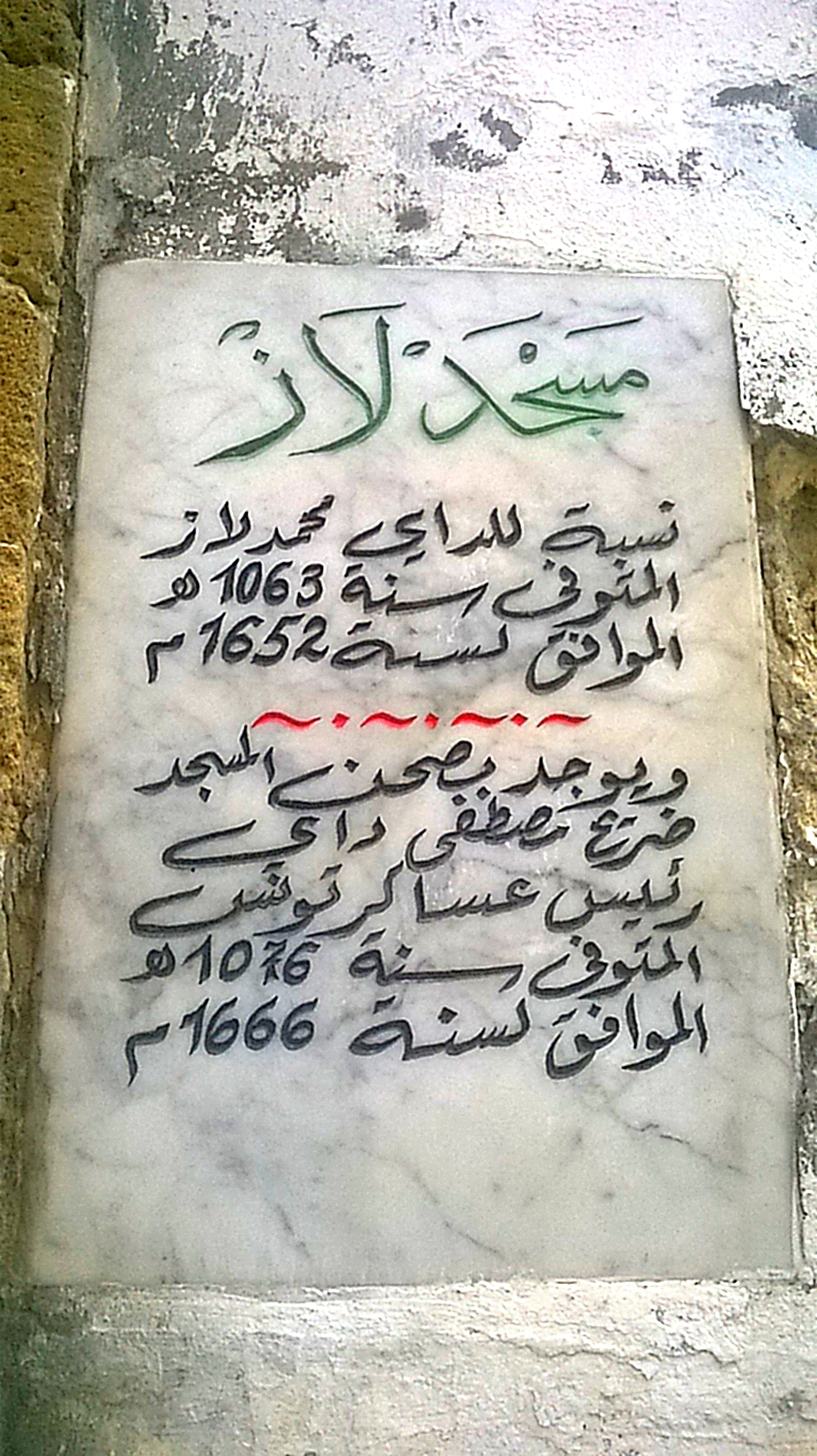
Commemorative plaque of the mosque

== Localization ==
It is located in Dar El Jeld Street.

== Etymology ==
The mosque got its name from the dey of Tunis Hadj Mohamed Laz, a janissary from Lazistan.

== Description ==
According to the commemorative plaque, Hadj Mustapha Laz Dey was buried in the mosque.
