= Uthman Dey =

Uthman Dey or Kara Osman Dey (died in September 1610) was Dey of Tunis from 1593 until his death.

== Biography ==
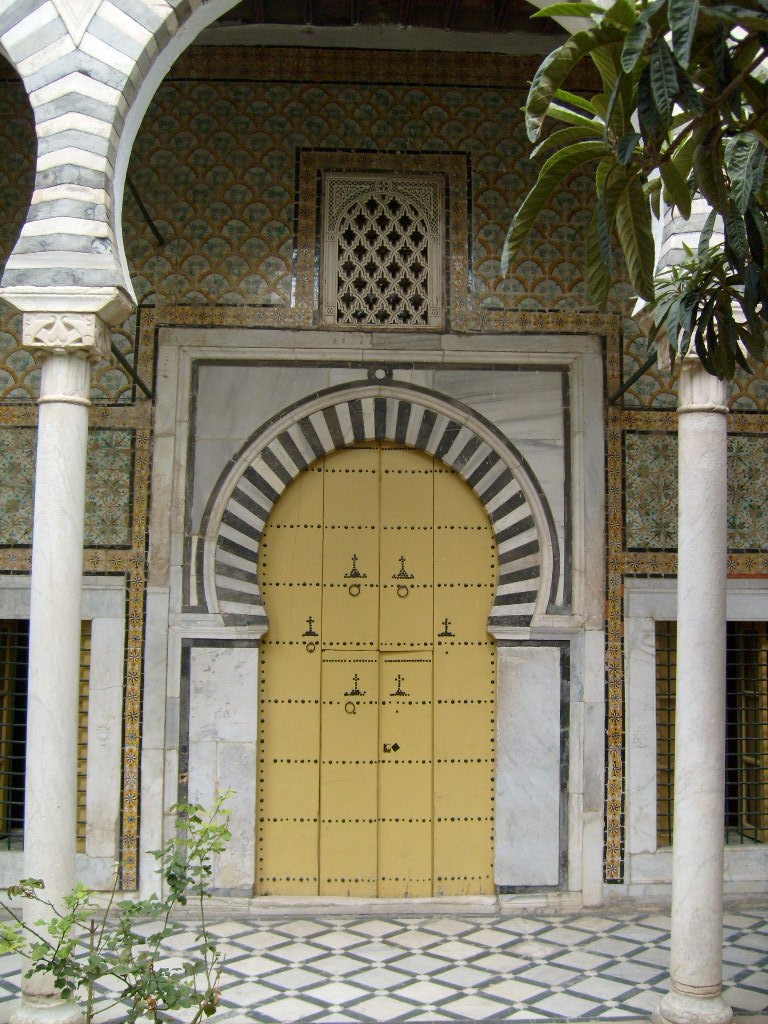
Gate to the front court of the Dar Othman

A Turkish soldier of Anatolian origin, where he had worked as a cobbler, he arrived with the forces of Koca Sinan Pasha which took Tunis from Spain in 1574. In 1593 he was elected as Dey of the Turkish militia of Tunis; he thereby became the military commander of Tunis. Then in 1598 he truly took power by restricting the Pasha to a purely honorific role.

Tunis entered a new era under his rule, with the pacification of the hinterland, the creation of a powerful fleet and a network of forts (borj) intended to guard the coast. It was in practice him who welcomed (around 1609) the major communities of refugees expelled from Castile and Aragon. It is estimated that between 60,000 and 80,000 of these arrived in Tunisia in this period. He settled some at Tunis and also allowed further families to settle in Zaghouan, Testour, Soliman, Turki, Grombalia, Medjez el-Bab and Tebourba. These settlers brought a new way of life and new crafts (like the making of the chachia) with them, which contributed to the prosperity of the territory.

Dey also welcomed pirates, including Jack Ward, whom arranged a deal to use Dey's Tunis port as a base of operations for raiding and taking of European ships, with Dey guaranteed a portion of the loot.

In his old age he became nervous about leaving the capital and the troublesome militia, so he created the position of Bey to command the armed expeditions sent into the countryside to collect taxes and maintain order. He conferred the office on a Georgian janissary named Ramdhan. Uthman also had a palace built in the centre of the Medina of Tunis, to serve as his residence, which is known as the Dar Othman (dating to the end of the 16th century) - he was the only Dey to live in the medina, as the others preferred the greater security of the kasbah. He also built several barracks and forts, as well as walls of several cities, which had been destroyed during the war against Spain, as at Bizerte.

He married his daughter to his lieutenant and eventual successor, Yusuf Dey. Uthman Dey was also the grandfather of princess Aziza Uthmana. At his death he was buried in what is now the tourba Aziza Uthmana in the kasbah, where his descendants were also interred.

== Bibliography ==
- Alphonse Rousseau, Annales tunisiennes ou aperçu historique sur la régence de Tunis, éd. Bastide, Alger, 1864.
