= Dar Daouletli =

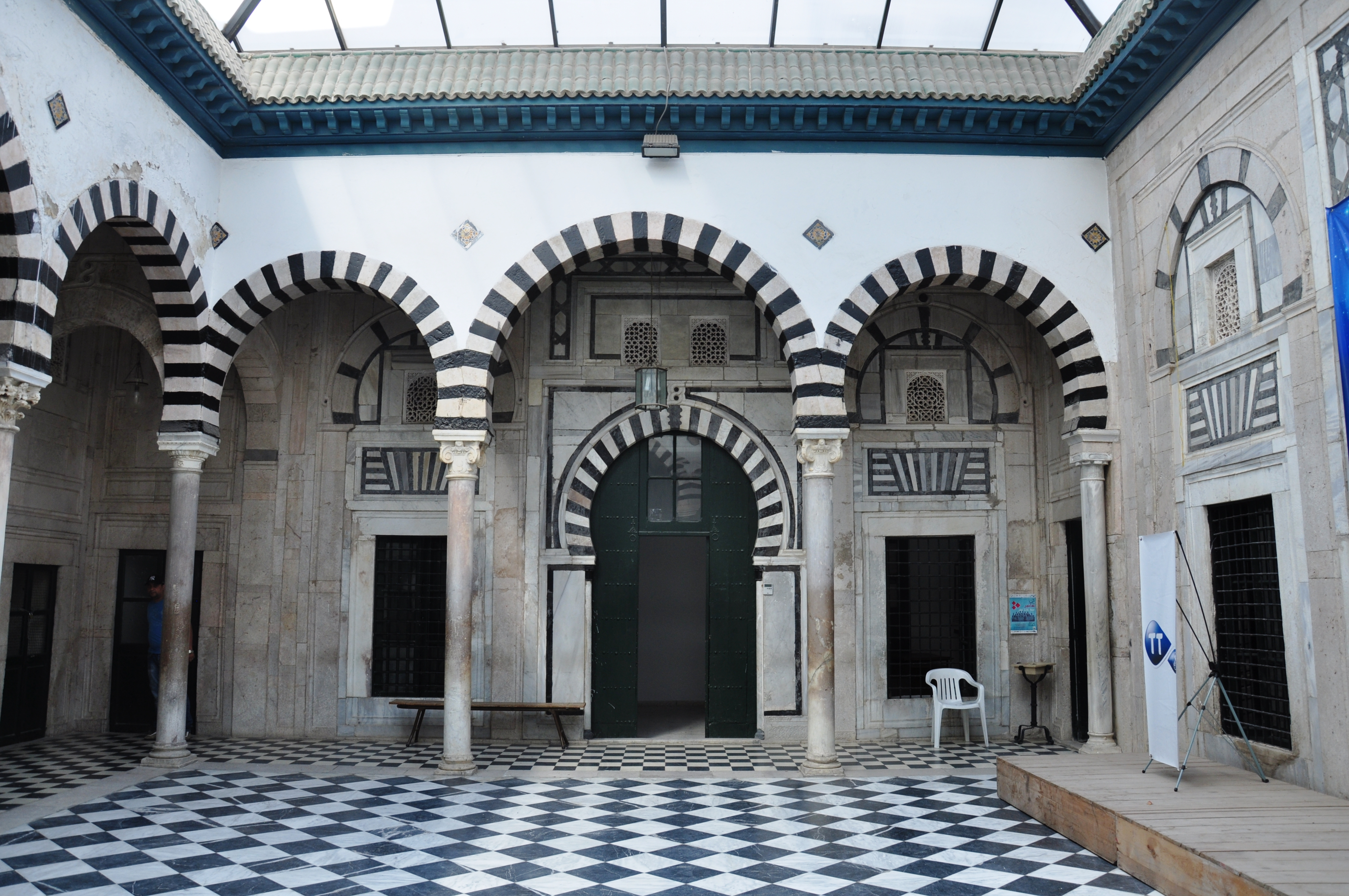
- Interactive map of the Dar Daouletli area

General information
- Type: Palace
- Architectural style: Moorish; Tunisian; Ottoman
- Location: Medina of Tunis, Tunis, Tunisia
- Year built: 17th Century
- Client: Daouletli

Dar Daouletli is an old palace in the medina of Tunis.

== Etymology ==
The palace got its name from one of his previous owners, the daouletli (Turkish word that derives from the Arabic word daoula meaning «government») or dey.

== Localization ==
It is located in El Driba street, near Sidi Ben Arous Street.

== History ==
The palace was built in the 17th century. On 19 October 1992, it became an official historical monument. Nowadays, it is the main office of Rachidia.

== Gallery ==
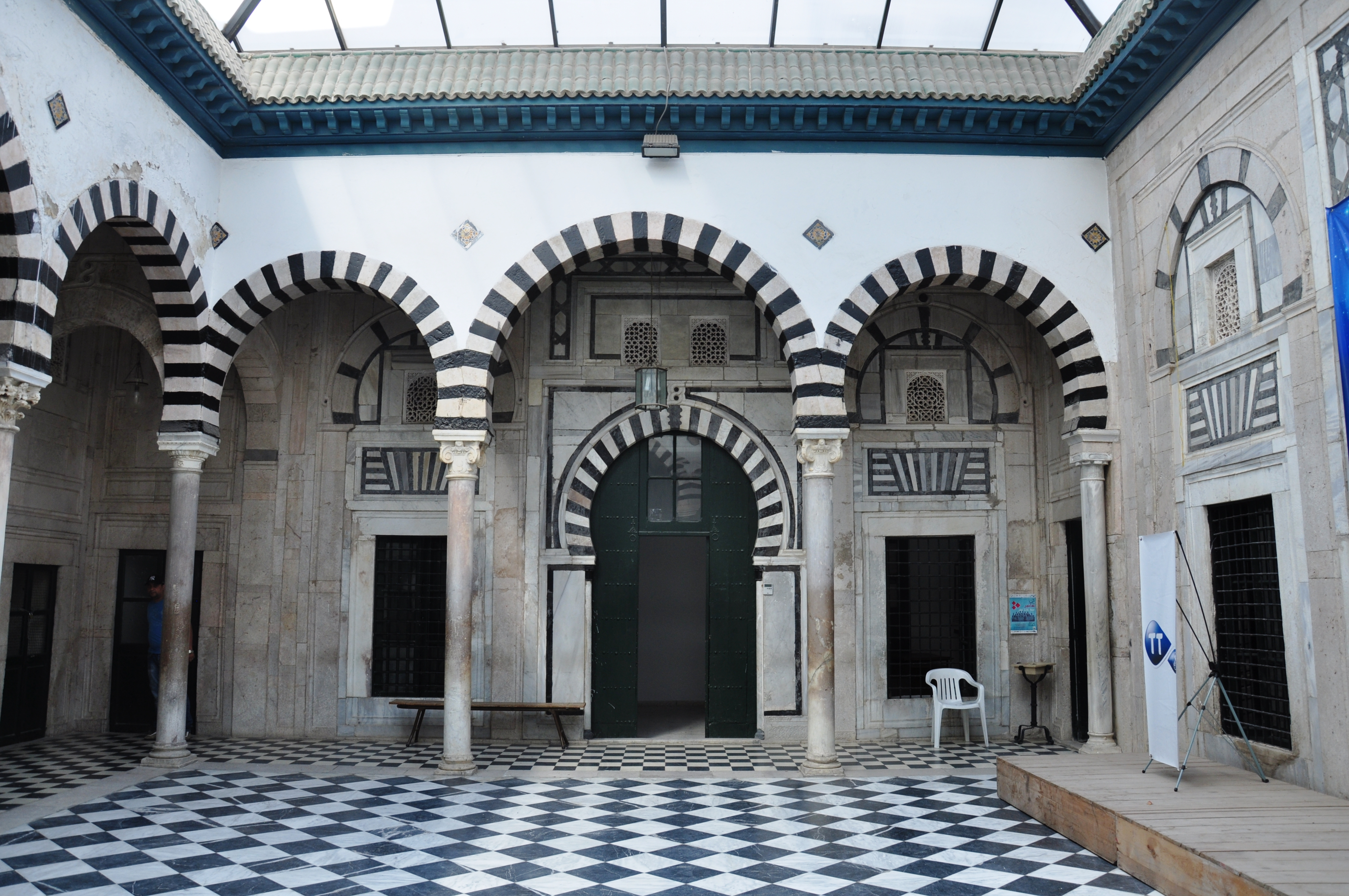
Dar Daouletli

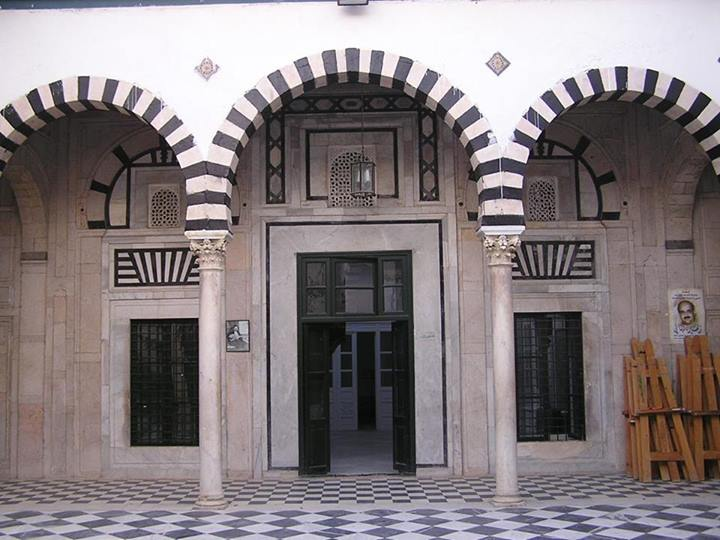
Northern facade of the main hall

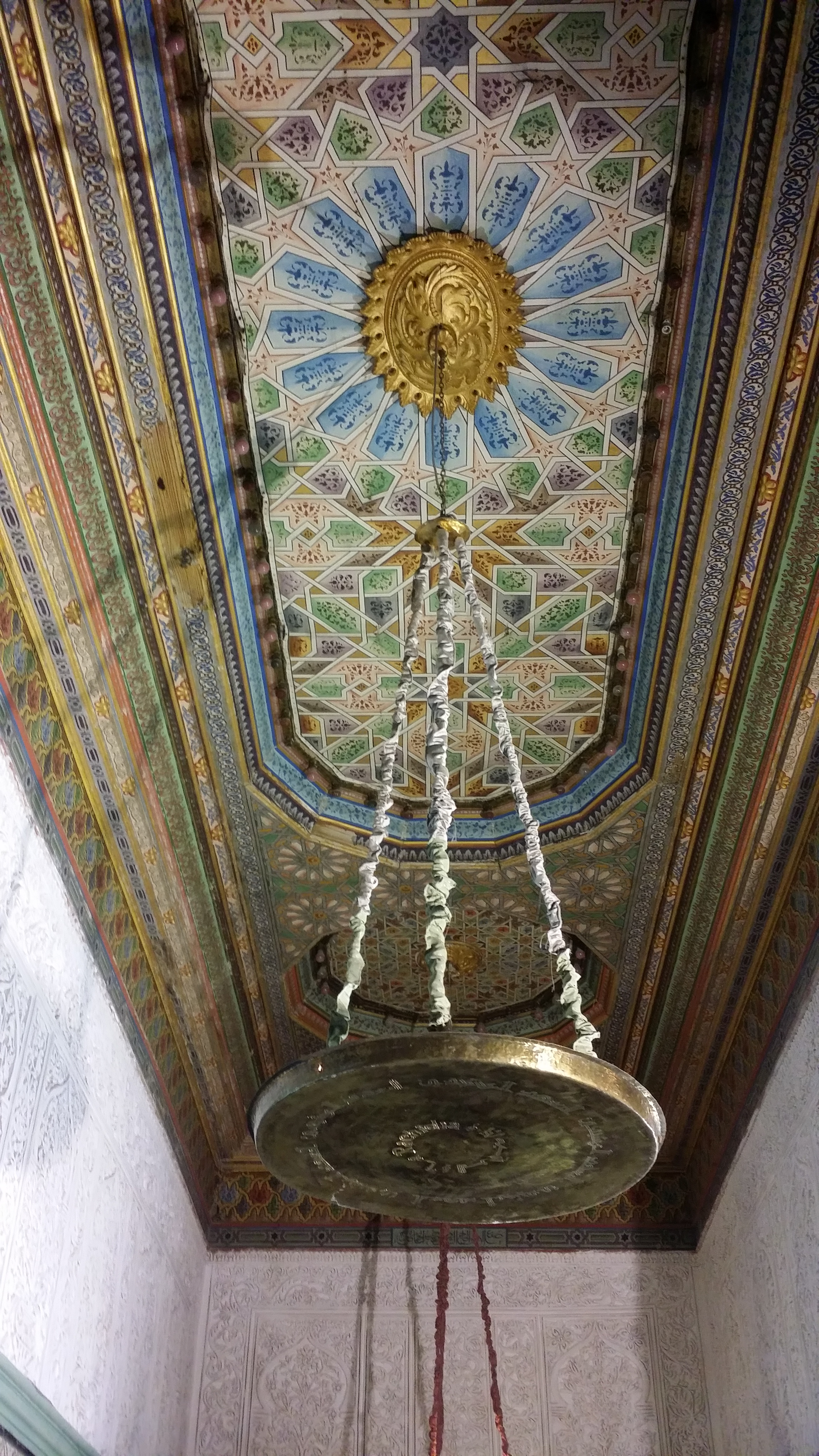
Ceiling of the main room Dar Rachidia

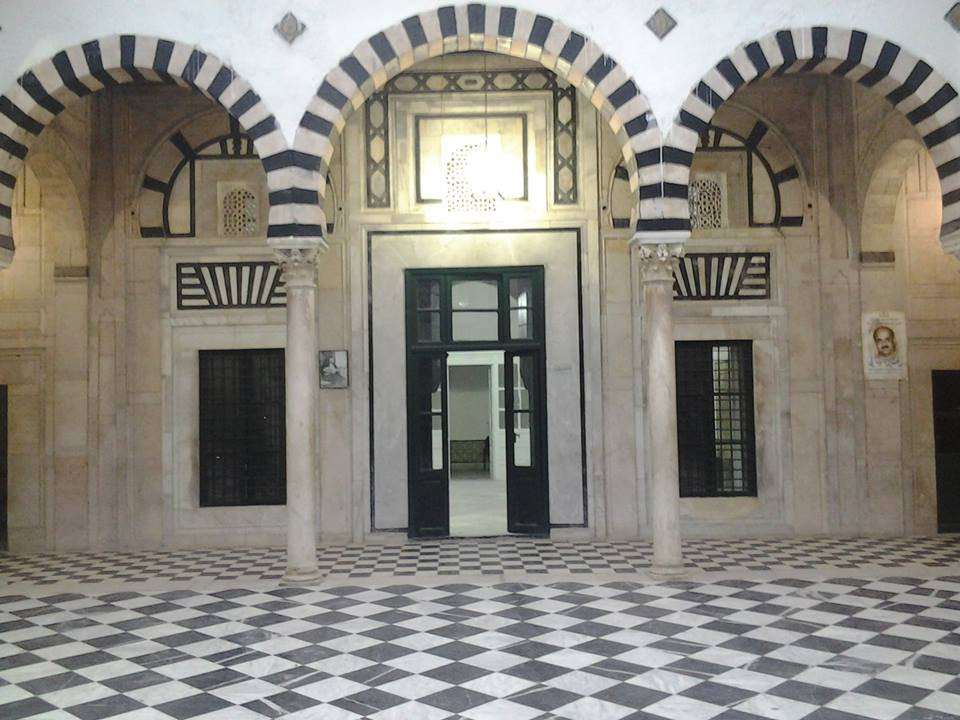
Southern facade of the main hall

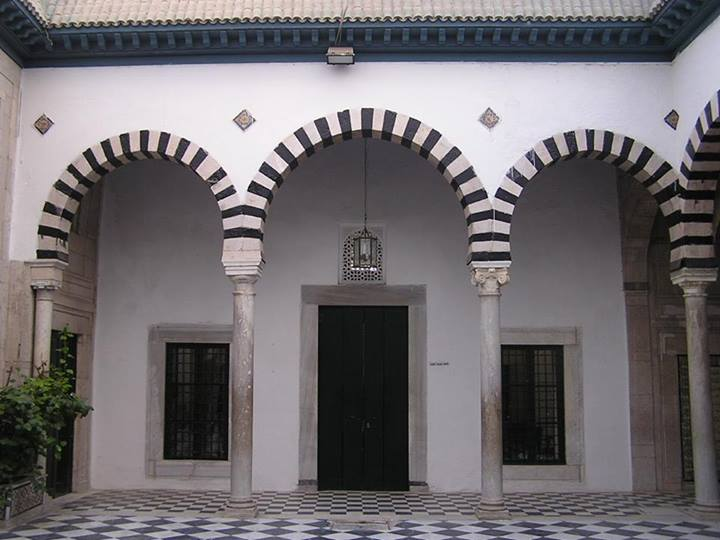
western facade of the main hall

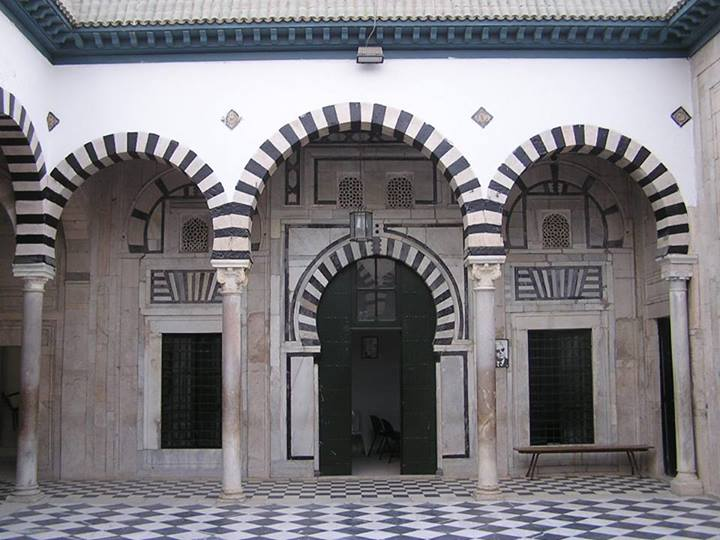
Eastern facade of the main hall

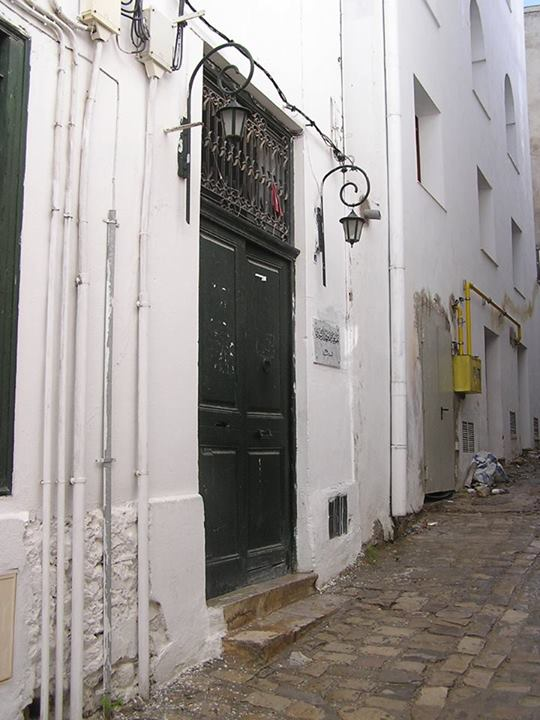
Entrance of Dar Daouletli

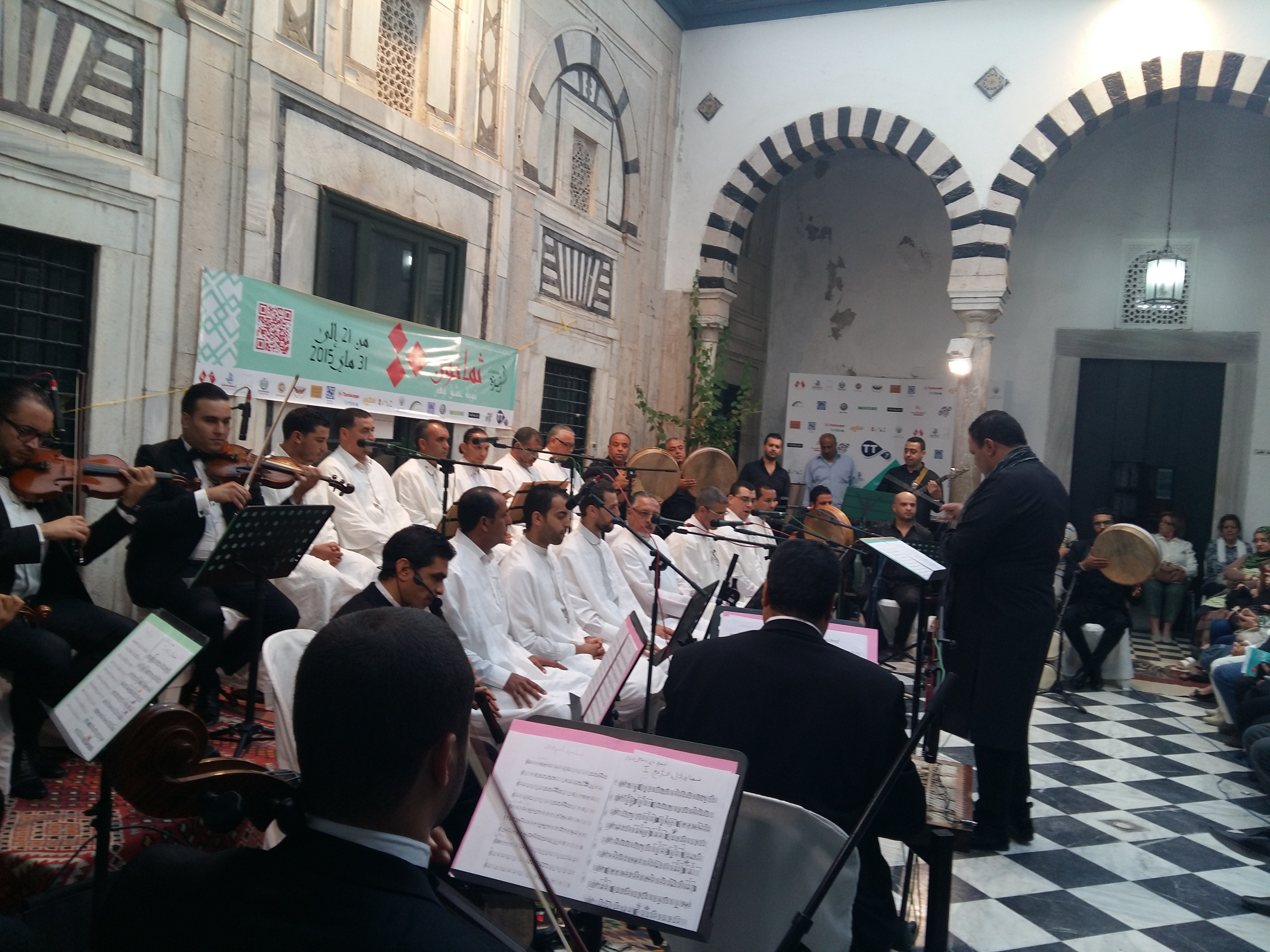
A concert in the hall

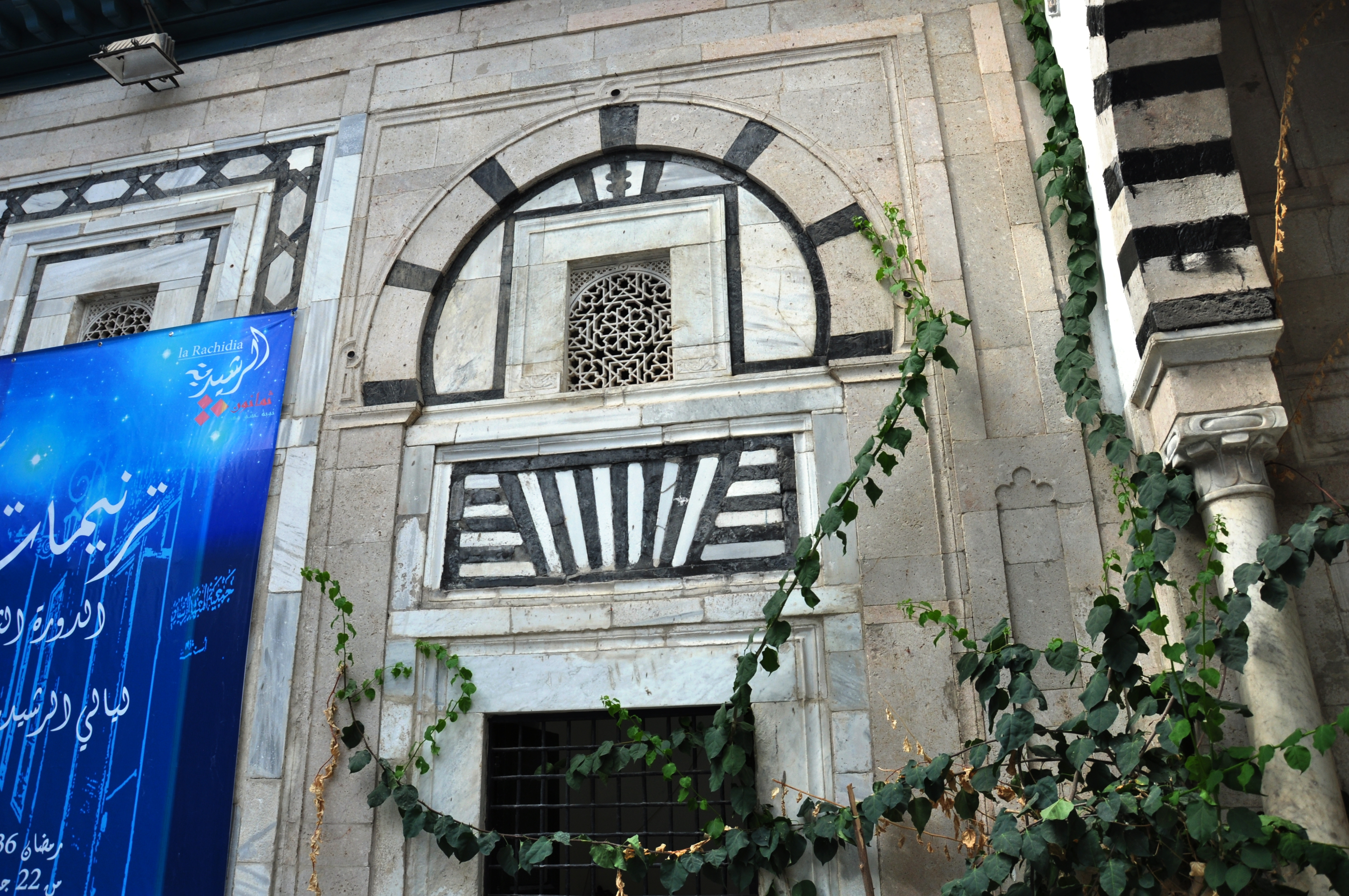
Decoration of the walls

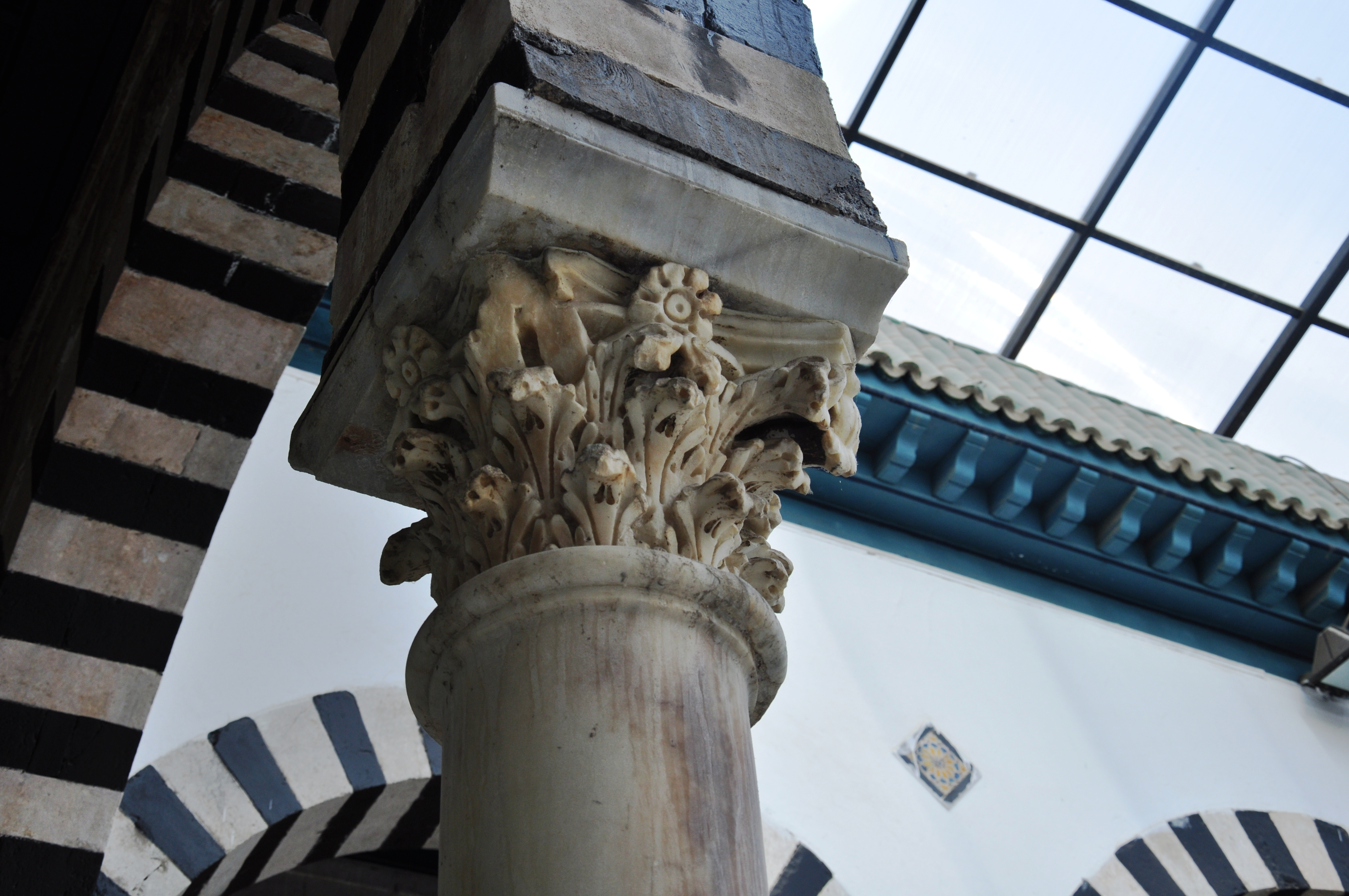
The columns

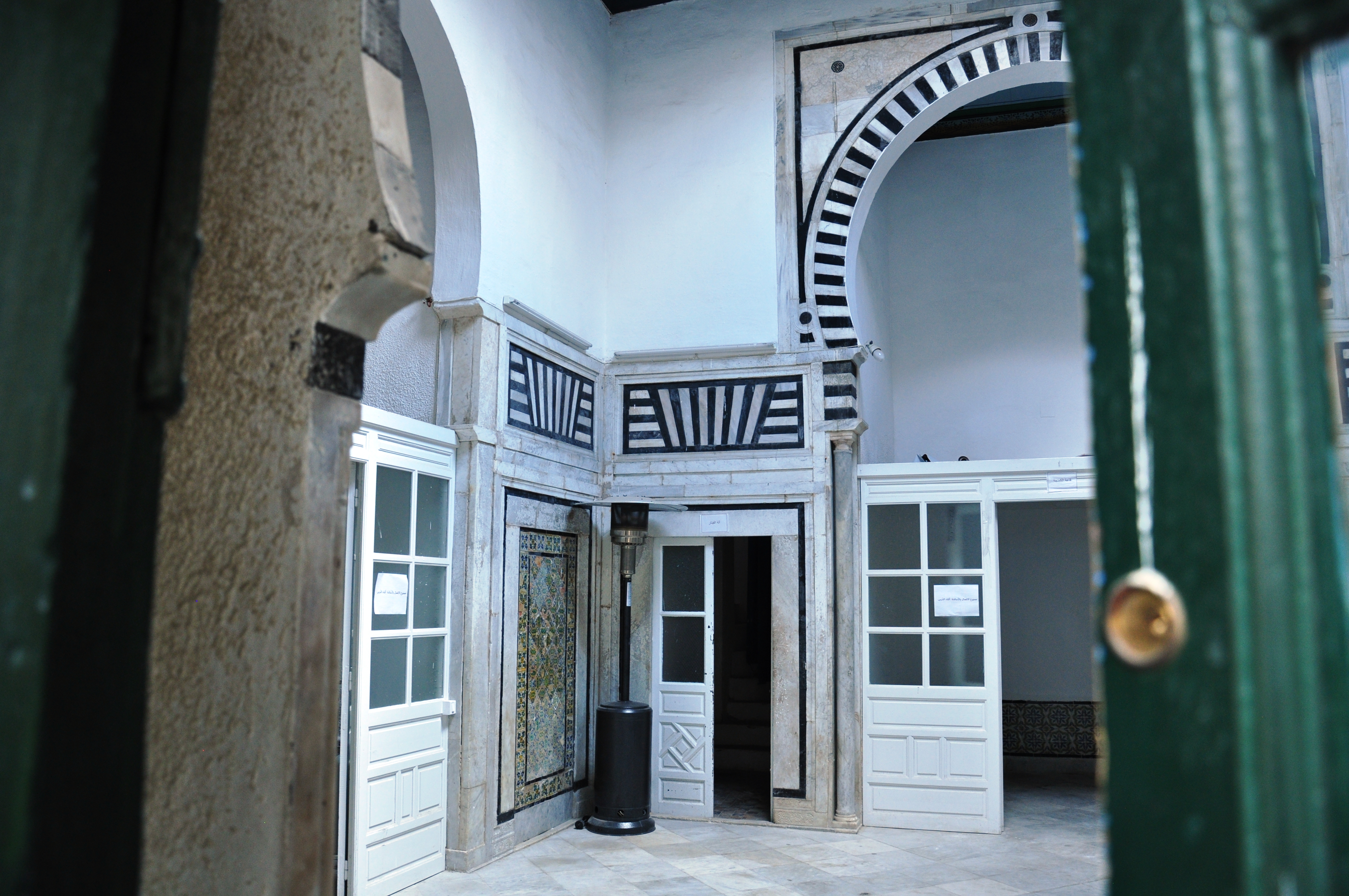
A room in Dar Daouletli
