= Ghar el-Melh =

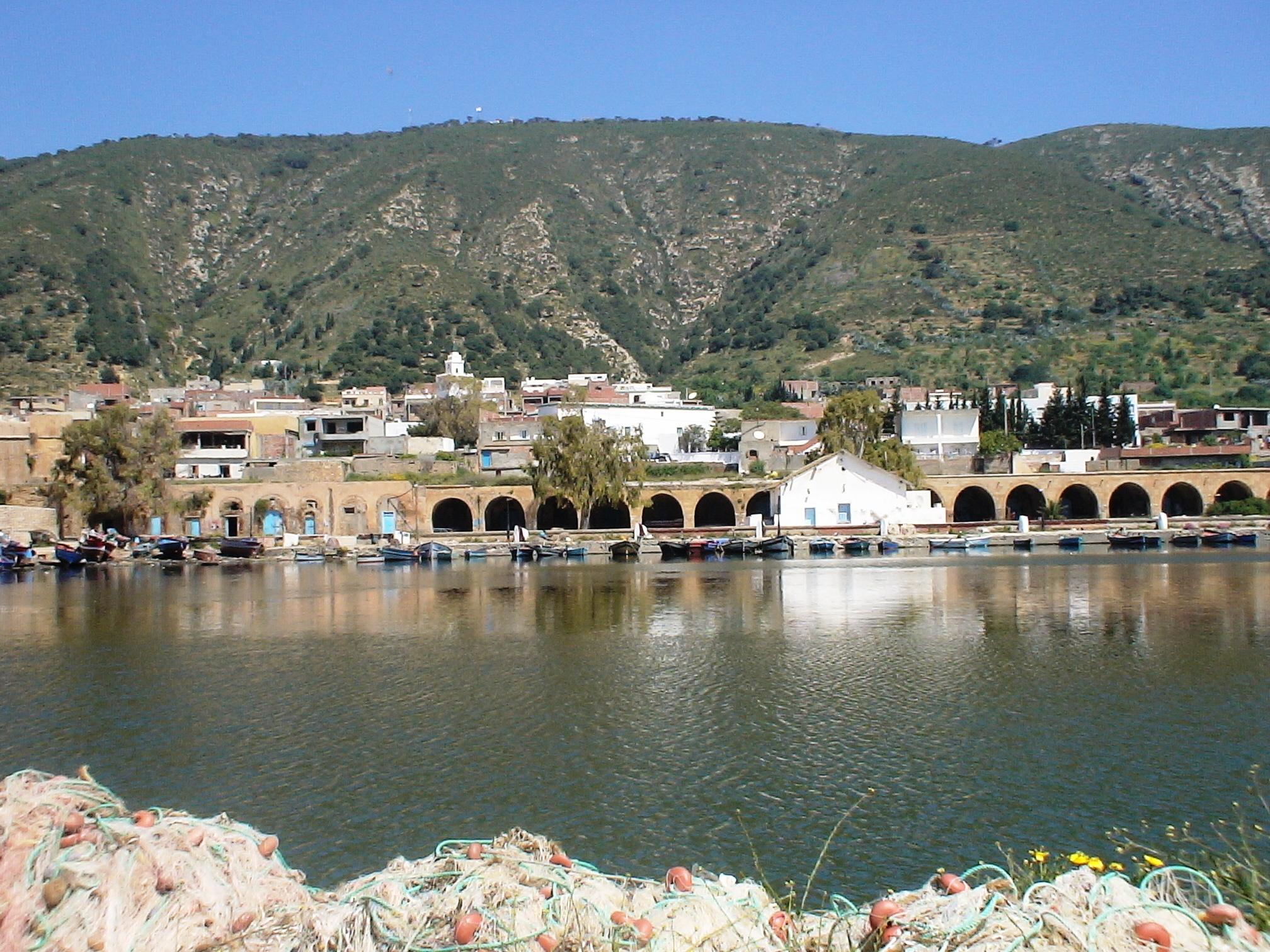

- Location in Tunisia
- Coordinates: 37°10′0″N 10°11′0″E
- Country: Tunisia
- Governorate: Bizerte Governorate

Population (2014)
  - Total: 10,530
- Time zone: UTC+01:00 (CET)
- Postal code: 7033

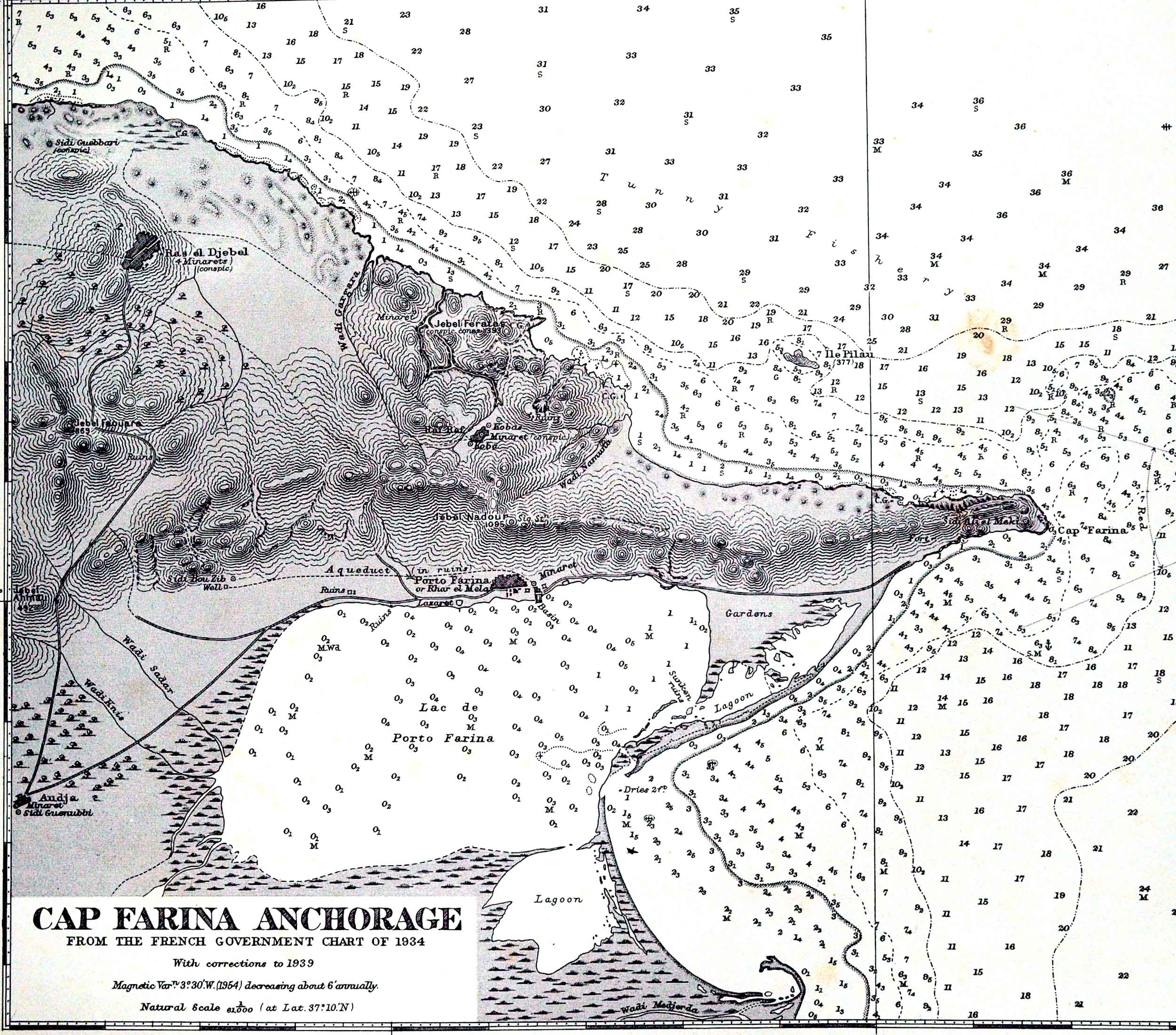
A nautical chart of the Cape Farina anchorage in 1939

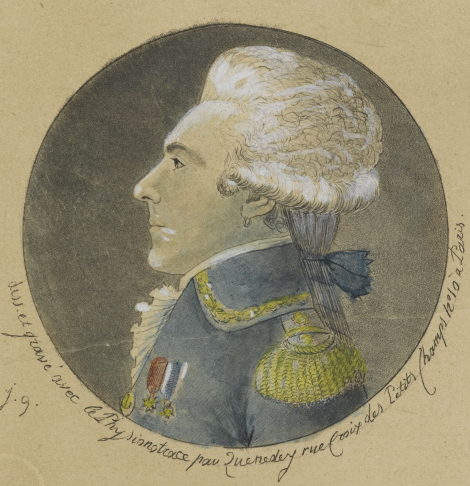
Captain Rafélis de Broves, one of the Europeans who led naval bombardments against Ghar el-Melh in retaliation against its support of piracy

Ghar el-Melh (Arabic: غارالملح, Ghar al-Milh, "Salt Grotto"), the classical Rusucmona and Castra Delia and colonial Porto Farina, is a town and former port on the southern side of Cape Farina in Bizerte Governorate, Tunisia.

== History ==
=== Phoenician colony ===
The Phoenician settlement, which was called 𐤓𐤔𐤀𐤔𐤌𐤍 (meaning "the Cape of Eshmun"), at Ghar el-Melh, a little inland from the present site, began around the same time as Utica and its dating presents the same problems. Several classical authors place northern Tunisia's colonization c. 1100 BC but modern archaeology has only found evidence suggestive of a date closer to c. 800 BC. In either case, the settlement at Ghar el-Melh came to serve as Utica's chief port as the Medjerda changed course and began silting up Utica's harbor. Its Punic name Rus Eshmun meant "Cape Eshmun", after the Punic name for Cape Farina.

Scipio Africanus landed nearby, took the town, and pillaged the surrounding countryside in 204 BC ahead of his siege of Utica during the Second Punic War. A naval battle ending in Roman victory was fought off the town's coast the next year, ahead of Zama and the end of the war.

=== Roman city ===
The port fell under Roman rule along with the rest of the Carthaginian Empire during the course of the Punic Wars. It sometimes preserved its former name, Latinized as Rusucmona, but also came to be known as Castra Lalia or Delia, presumably after Scipio's friend and lieutenant G. Laelius. Its peninsula preserved an ancient and important temple to "Apollo", probably representing a continuation of the Carthaginian worship of the healing god Eshmun harmonized with the Greco-Roman pantheon. Castra Delia held native city (civitas) status as part of the province of Byzacena. It flourished from around 30 BC to around AD 330. During this time the city was also the seat of a Christian bishopric.

=== Pirate base ===
Much later, it became an important base for the Barbary corsairs. Following the conquest of Tunisia by Charles V in 1534 and 1535, Spaniards tried to remove the pirates unsuccessfully. John of Austria also visited the bay during his reconquest of Tunis in October 1573, following his victory at Lepanto.

The Italian convert, Ottoman corsair, and Tunisian dey Usta Murad expanded the city—then known as Porto Farina—greatly enough to consider it a second founding. He established fortifications to prevent the harbor's use by Christian powers and attracted refugee Moriscos by the provision of certain liberties at Porto Farina, Rafraf, and Ras el-Djebel. During this era, it rivaled the size and importance of Bizerte.

In early 1655, an English fleet under Robert Blake blockaded nine warships in Porto Farina's harbor in order to pressure the dey Mustafa Laz to free Englishmen held as slaves and to provide compensation for English ships recently seized by local pirates. The dey offered to provide a new treaty going forward but refused emancipation or compensation for people and ships already taken. Any such action, he felt, should begin with the English, one of whose captains had recently sold a company of Tunisian troops as galley slaves to the Knights of Malta instead of transporting them to Smyrna (present-day Izmir) as arranged. When Blake maintained his blockade, the dey had his warships' rigging removed, the town's fortifications strengthened, and its garrison increased. On April 14, 1655, Blake finally attacked. Dividing his fleet to attack the warships and the 20-gun fort simultaneously, he had his men storm and burn the warships in turn before declaring victory and leaving the harbor. Because his sustained assault was able to silence the town's defenses entirely, the engagement is celebrated as the first successful naval attack on shore-based fortifications.

The port and its defenses were then quickly rebuilt. The Ottoman Empire erected Borj el-Loutani as a fort in 1659; Fort Nadur and the "Genovese fort" were also raised around the same time. Borj el-Loutani was later used as an artillery base and as a prison; the others gradually fell into disrepair. The town began to be used by British and Maltese privateers, as well as Turkish and local corsairs.

Muhammad Talak and Ali Bey were arrested and strangled in Porto Farina in 1682 as part of the chaotic struggles of the later Muradid dynasty. Shortly afterward, three ships arriving from Turkey proper infected the town with the plague.

When Husain I took advantage of Ibrahim Sharif's Algerian imprisonment to usurp control of Tunisia in 1705, the Algerians released Sharif to return home. Husain, intent upon consolidating his power, had Sharif killed en route at Porto Farina. The former dey's tomb lies beside one of the town's forts. Husain established an arsenal at Porto Farina two years later.

Locals were calling the town Ghar el-Melh (recorded by a visiting Frenchman as "Gramela") by 1724. French annoyance at piracy in the area prompted Louis XV to order an attack in 1770 by Admiral de Broves, commanding a squadron consisting of 2 warships (bearing 74 and 50 guns respectively), 2 frigates (24 guns each), a bark (18 guns), 2 schooners, a flute, and some other ships provided by Hospitaller Malta. The ships fired on Porto Farina for two days. De Brove's fleet also attacked Bizerte and Monastir before the Treaty of Bardo ended hostilities on August 25.

Similarly, when Venice took exception to Tunisian-based piracy in the early 1780s, its leaders ordered a series of bombardments that included an attack by Admiral Emo's fleet on Porto Farina on September 6, 1784. This seems, however, to have been the last time a foreign fleet bothered the port; by 1806, it was only a winter port for the bey's warships and it was necessary to take special measures each voyage to get them over the harbor's rising sandbar.

The beylik's arsenal was finally removed in 1818, but fear that a similar fate might befall its navy as had Algeria's caused the bey to hire dredgers and workers to improve conditions; he was again able to bring his fleet into the harbor by December. When a severe storm destroyed the beylik's fleet at anchor off La Goulette on February 7–8, 1821, however, such efforts were discontinued and the sandbar off Porto Farina was allowed to continue to grow.

=== Modern town ===
In 1834 a large private arsenal belonging to a Maltese pirate exploded and destroyed part of the town. Ahmed Bey, the last Bey of Constantine, decided to clamp down on piracy and attempted to turn the port over to legitimate trade. In 1837, he began efforts to restore the town's arsenal. Although that never proved feasible, the bey established a palace in the city and an attendant garrison. Command was given to a favorite of the bey's, the general Salah Cheboul. The forts were renovated, and the port cleaned and maintained. From 1840, a community of Maltese, Italians, and French settled in the locality. By 1853, however, the beylik's new frigates could no longer access the harbor and the garrison was reduced.

In the early years of Tunisia's French occupation, the Bizerte Port Company (French: Compagnie du Port de Bizerte) made an attempt to again dredge access to Porto Farina's harbor but a storm from the northeast closed the channel almost immediately after its opening and further attempts were abandoned. The formerly prosperous town's public buildings had already fallen into disrepair and were thoroughly scavenged by locals for other purposes. The prison, which was listed as a Tunisian Historic Monument in 1922, closed in 1964. Today Ghar el-Melh is a small farming town.

== Religion ==
The ancient bishopric survives today as a titular see of the Roman Catholic Church and the current bishop is Geoffrey James Robinson of Australia.

== Gallery ==
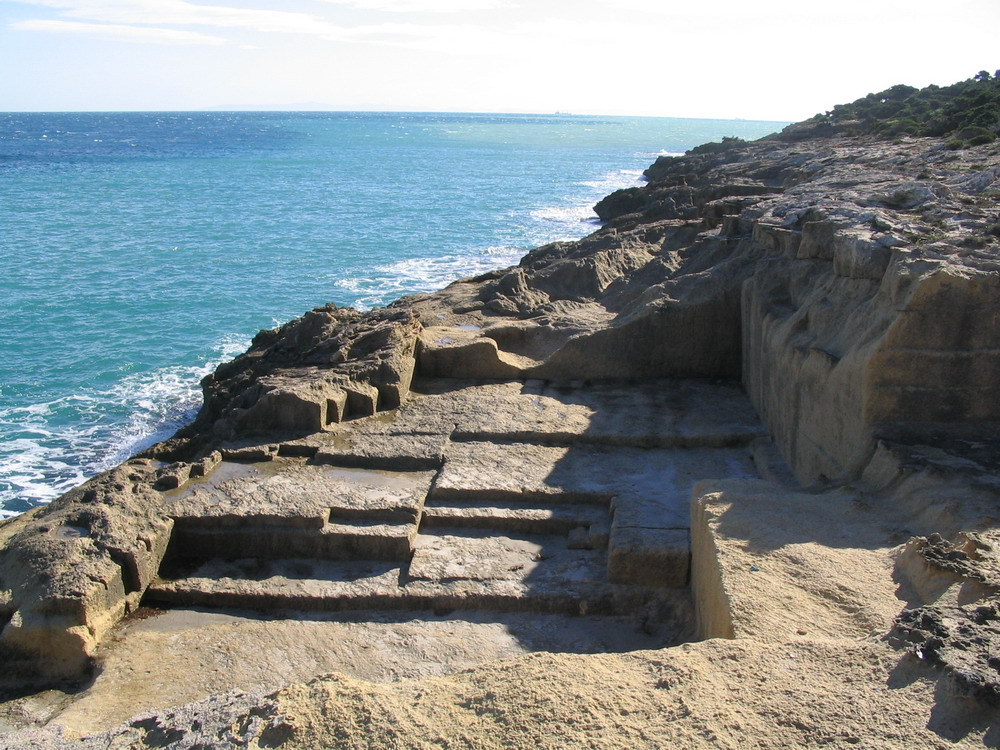
Ruins at Oum al-Abouab

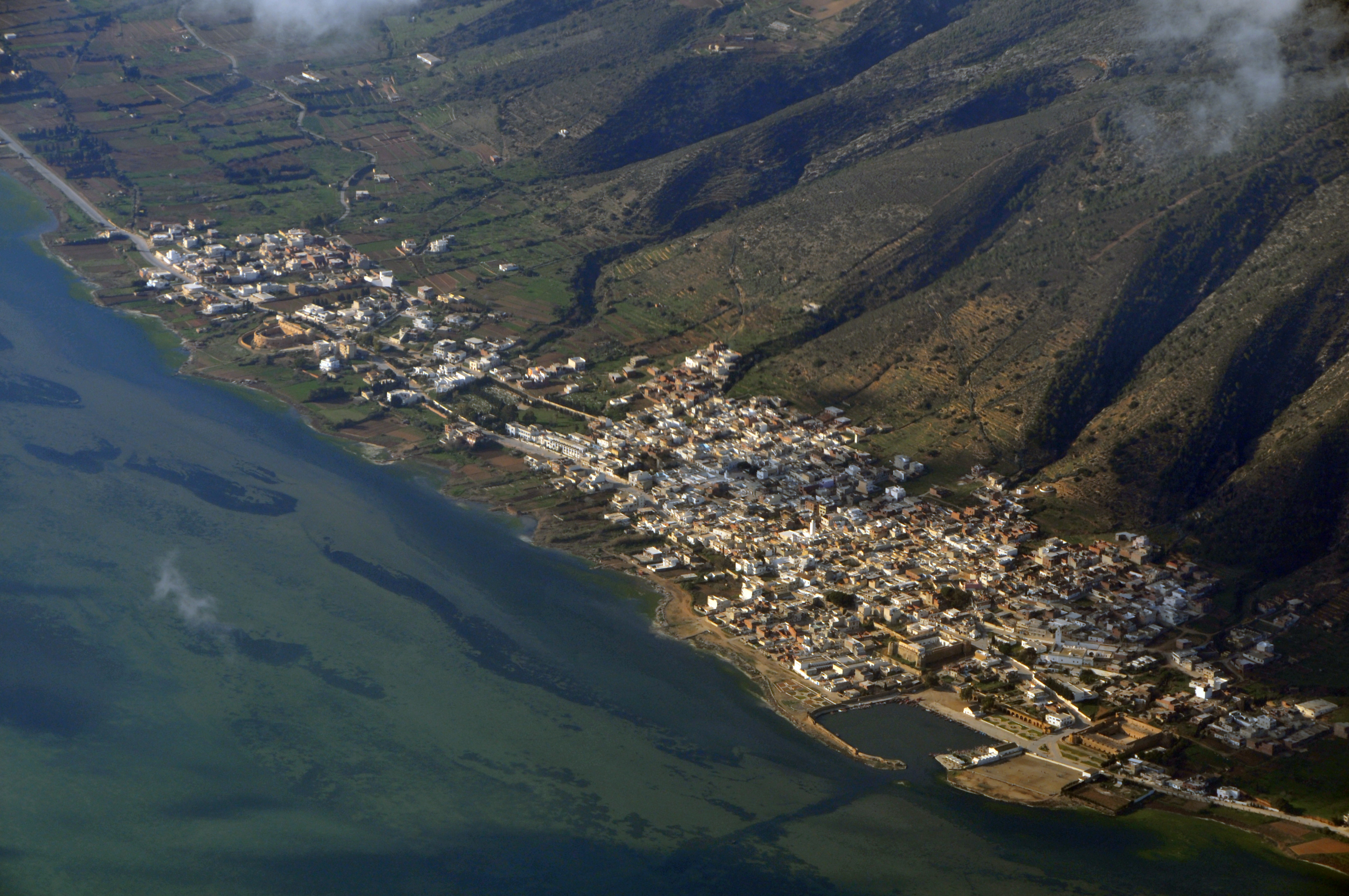
Aerial view of the town

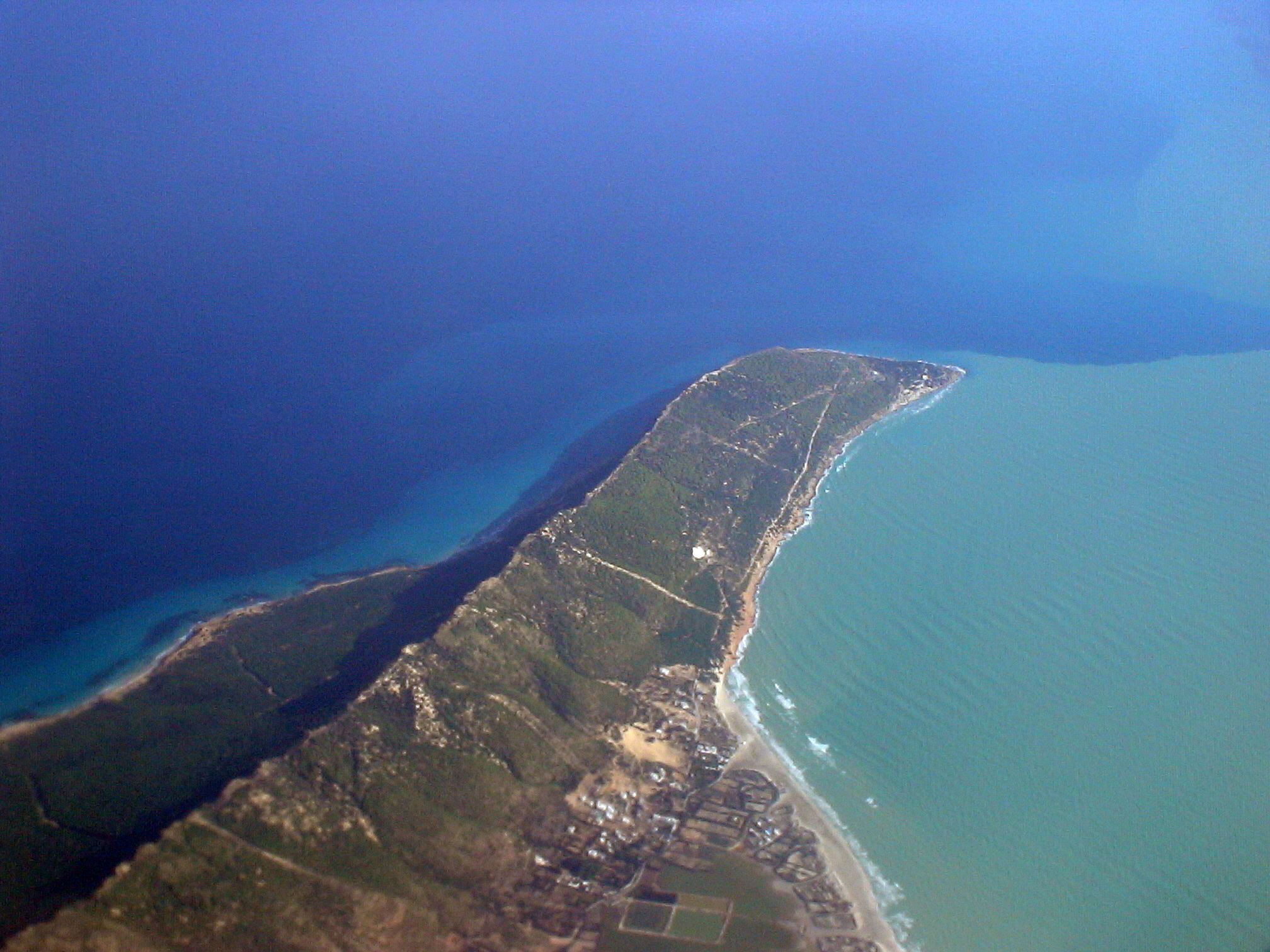
Aerial view of Cape Farina

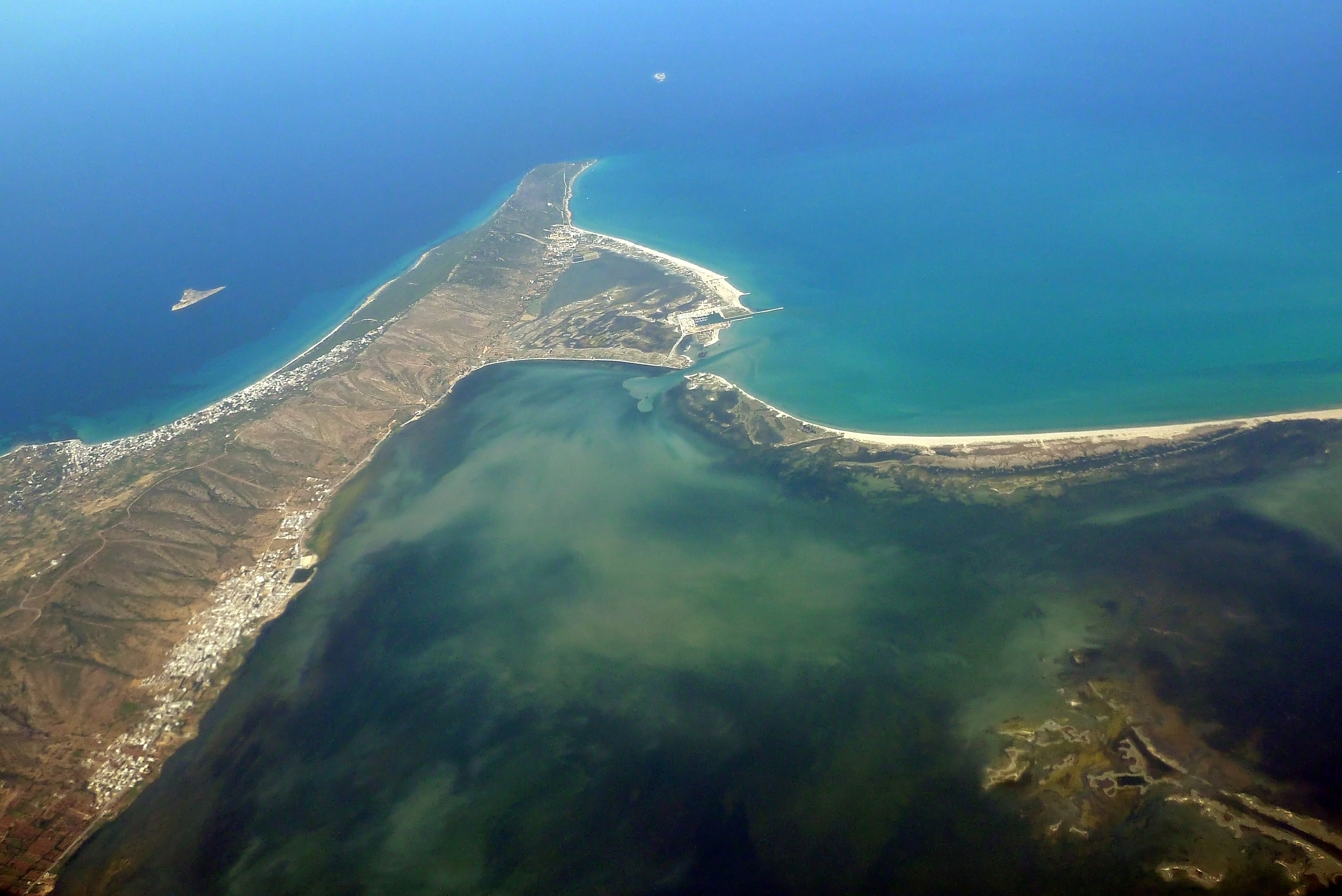
Aerial view of Cape Farina

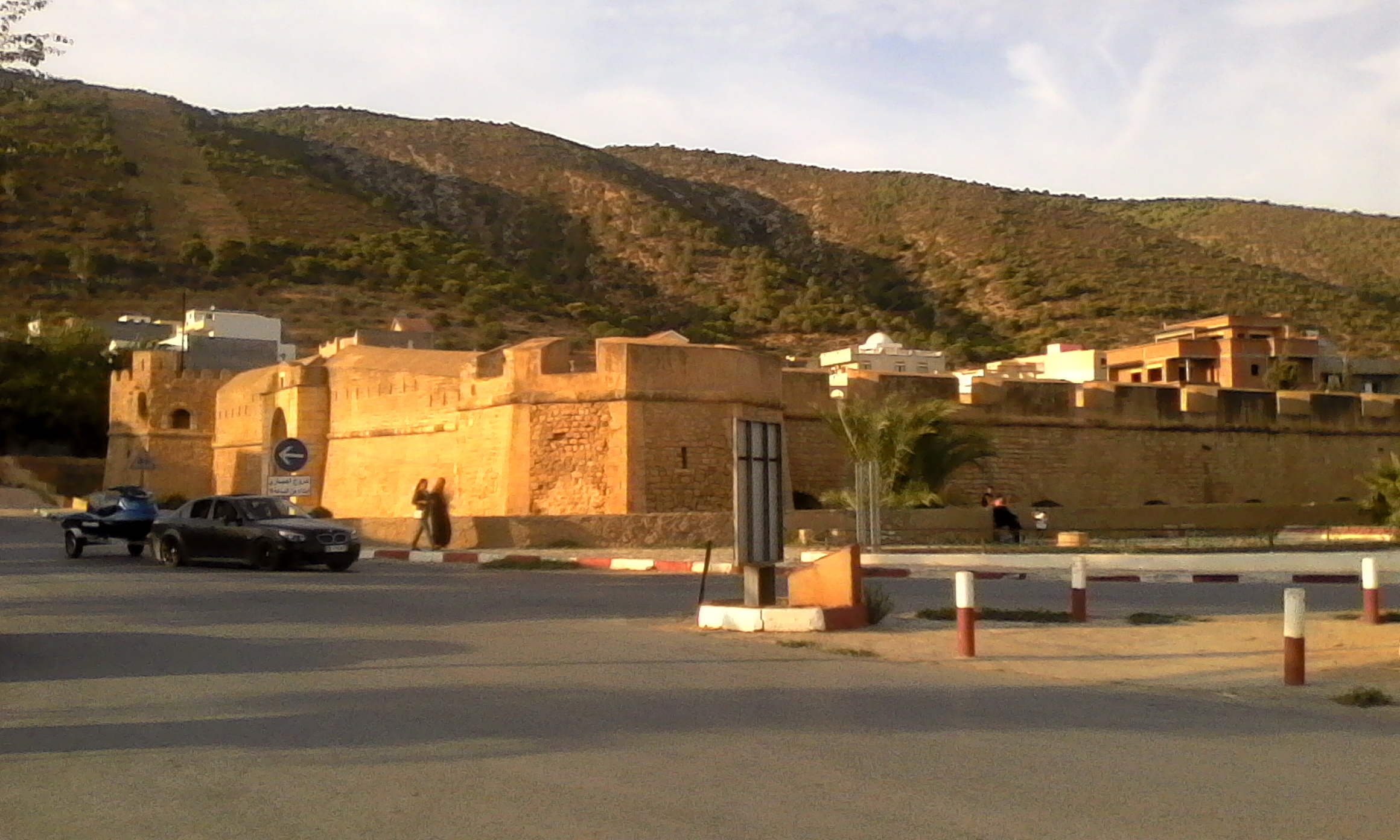
Borj el-Loutani

== See also ==
- Tunisian navy (1705-1881)
