= Bab Menara =

- Arabic: باب منارة
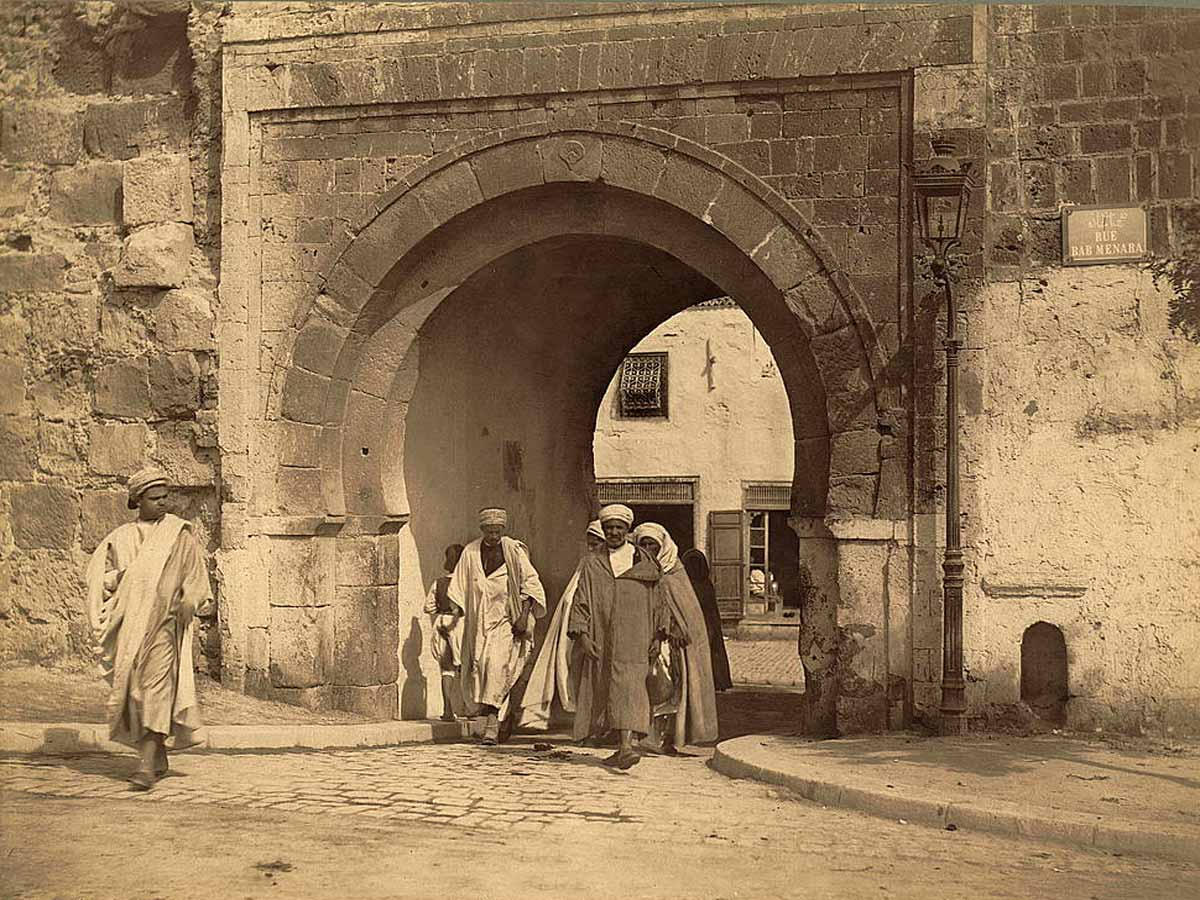
- The gate in 1900
- Etymology: "Lighthouse Gate", either for a lighthouse or a large oil lamp located at the gate

General information
- Location: Tunis, Tunisia
- Coordinates: 36.796889°N 10.167861°E
- Completed: before 1276

Bab Menara (Arabic: باب منارة) is one of the gates of the medina of Tunis.

It takes the name Bab Menara ("Gate of the Lighthouse"), either due to a lighthouse on the old palace, or due to a large oil lamp that was kept lit at the gate to illuminate the road for incoming caravans. The gate was finished by 1276, and connected the medina to El Haoua.
