= El Nakiri Mosque =

Mosque in Tunis, Tunisia

- مسجد النقيري

Religion
- Affiliation: Islam
- Branch/tradition: Sunni

Location
- Location: Tunis, Tunisia

Architecture
- Type: Mosque

El Nakiri Mosque (Arabic: مسجد النقيري) was a Tunisian mosque in the Medina of Tunis. It does not exist anymore.

== History ==
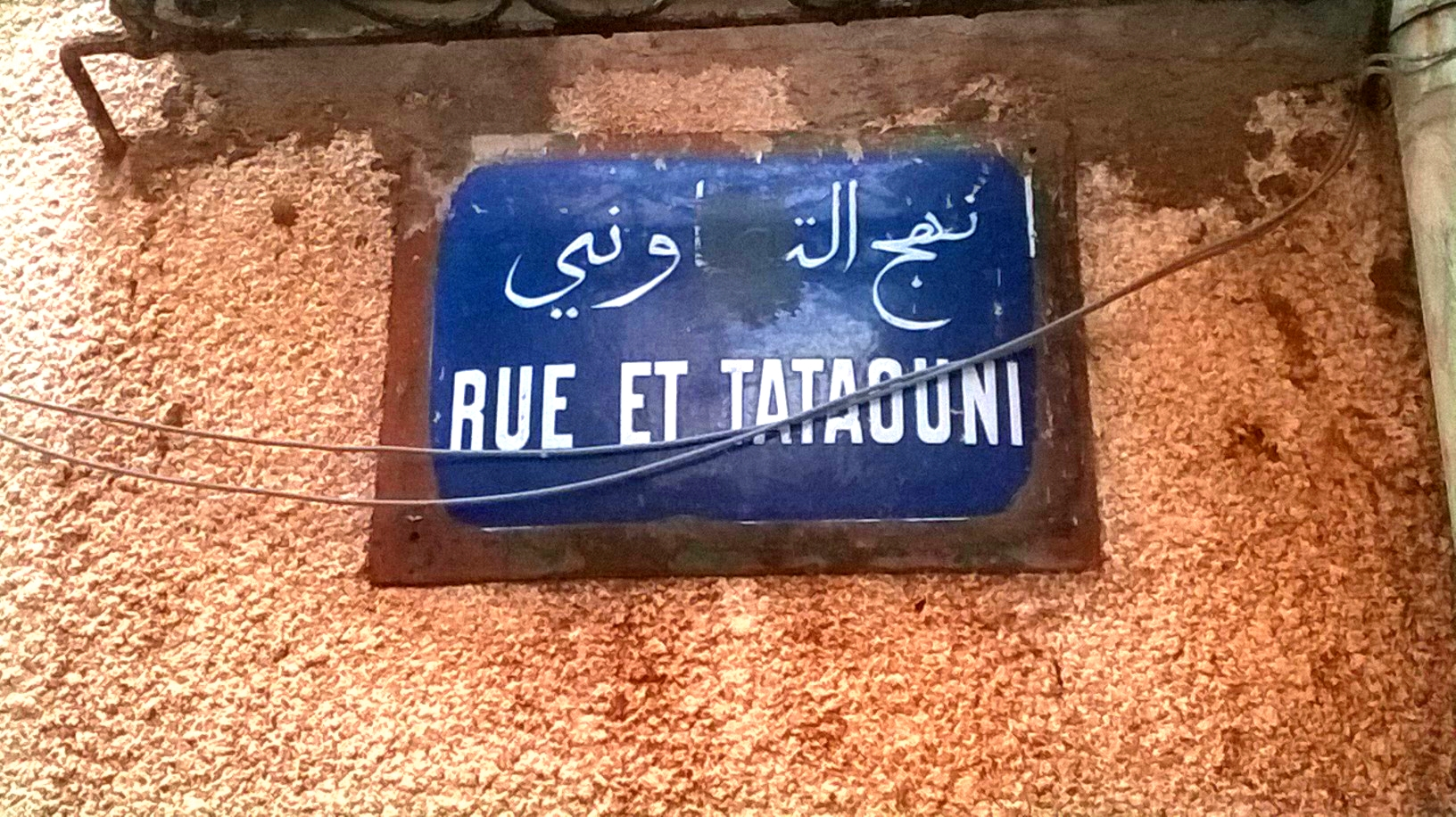
Metallic plaque of Etataouni Street

The mosque was located in Etataouni Street. It was built during the Hafsid era and consisted of a hall and the tomb of its founder.

== Etymology ==
The mosque was named after the Imam Mohamed Etataouni (Arabic: محمد التطاوني) who died in 1878.
