= Sidi Abdallah Cherif Mausoleum =

Zawiya in Tunis, Tunisia

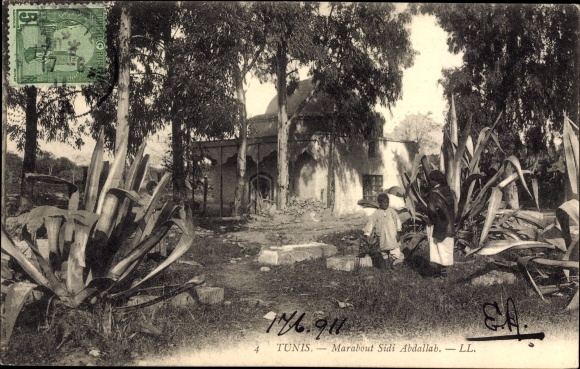
Old postcard showing the mausoleum of Sidi Abdallah Cherif

Sidi Abdallah Cherif mausoleum (زاوية سيدي عبد الله الشريف) is a zaouia of the medina of Tunis as well as a monument classified according to the decree of 31 August 1999.

It was located near a door of the medina bearing the same name before being transferred to the Ibn Sarraj street.
