= El Ghassiroun Mosque =

Mosque in Tunis, Tunisia

- مسجد الغاصرون

Religion
- Affiliation: Islam
- Branch/tradition: Sunni

Location
- Location: Tunis, Tunisia

Architecture
- Type: Mosque

El Ghassiroun Mosque (Arabic: مسجد الغاصرون) was a Tunisian mosque in the Medina of Tunis. It does not exist anymore.

== History ==
The mosque was built during the Hafsid Era.

== Localization ==
It was located in El Ghassiroun Street.
