= Karah Borni Mosque =

Mosque in Tunis, Tunisia

- مسجد قاره برني

Religion
- Affiliation: Islam
- Branch/tradition: Sunni

Location
- Location: Tunis, Tunisia

Architecture
- Type: Mosque

Karah Borni Mosque (Arabic: مسجد قاره برني) was a Tunisian mosque located in the medina of Tunis. It does not exist anymore.

== Localization ==
The mosque was located in Sidi El Agha Street.

== Etymology ==
The word Borni means black in Turkish while Karah means Hawk.

== History ==
According to the observers, the mosque was built during the Ottoman reign.
