= El Fell Mosque =

Mosque in Tunis, Tunisia

- جامع الفال
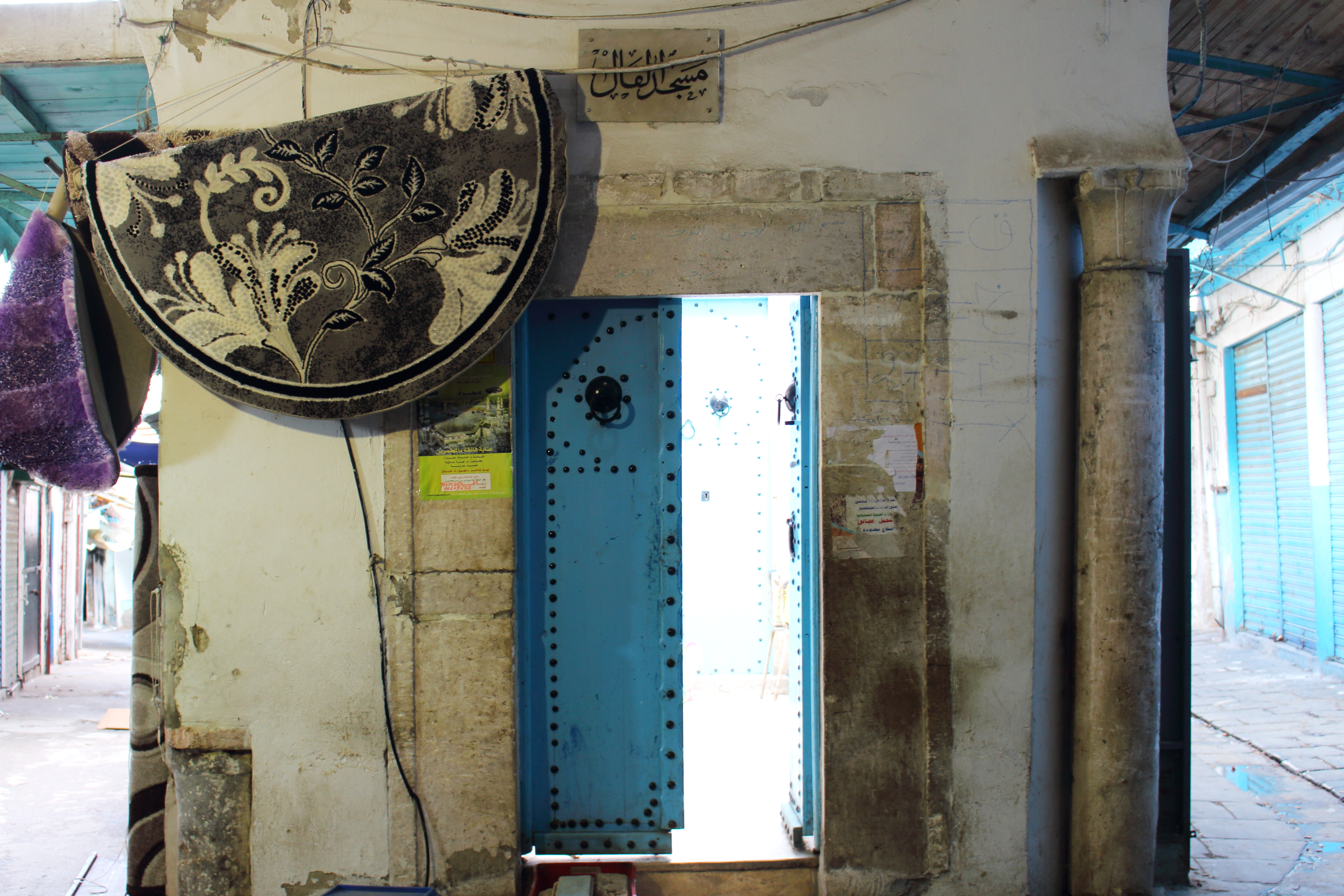

- Location within Tunisia

Religion
- Affiliation: Sunni Islam

Location
- Location: Tunis, Tunisia
- Interactive map of El Fell Mosque
- Coordinates: 36.799255°N 10.171958°E

Architecture
- Type: Mosque

El Fell Mosque or 'mosque of the chance' (Arabic: جامع الفال) is a small mosque located in the Azzafine hood in the Medina of Tunis.

== Localization ==
The mosque is located in 101 the Kasbah street near the entrance of Souk En Nhas.

== History ==
According to the historian Mohamed Belkhodja, it was built by the Zirids, a dynasty that ruled the whole Maghreb region from 972 and 1014, and then a part of it (Ifriqiya) until 1148.

== Etymology ==
People visit the mosque to get some luck while the Ulamas disagree with this belief.
