= Sidi Maaouia Mosque =

Mosque in Tunis, Tunisia

- مسجد سيدي معاوية

Religion
- Affiliation: Islam
- Branch/tradition: Sunni

Location
- Location: Tunis, Tunisia

Architecture
- Type: Mosque

Sidi Maaouia Mosque (Arabic: مسجد سيدي معاوية) was a Tunisian mosque located in the north of the medina of Tunis. It does not exist anymore.

== Localization ==
The mosque was located in El Monastiri Street.

== Etymology ==
It got its name from a saint, Sidi Maaouia, a Cape Bon native.

== History ==
The mosque had its own Habous for the Hadith recital during Ramadan. Nowadays, it is replaced by a private house.
