= Bab Sidi Kacem =

Coordinates: 36.796083°N 10.164667°E

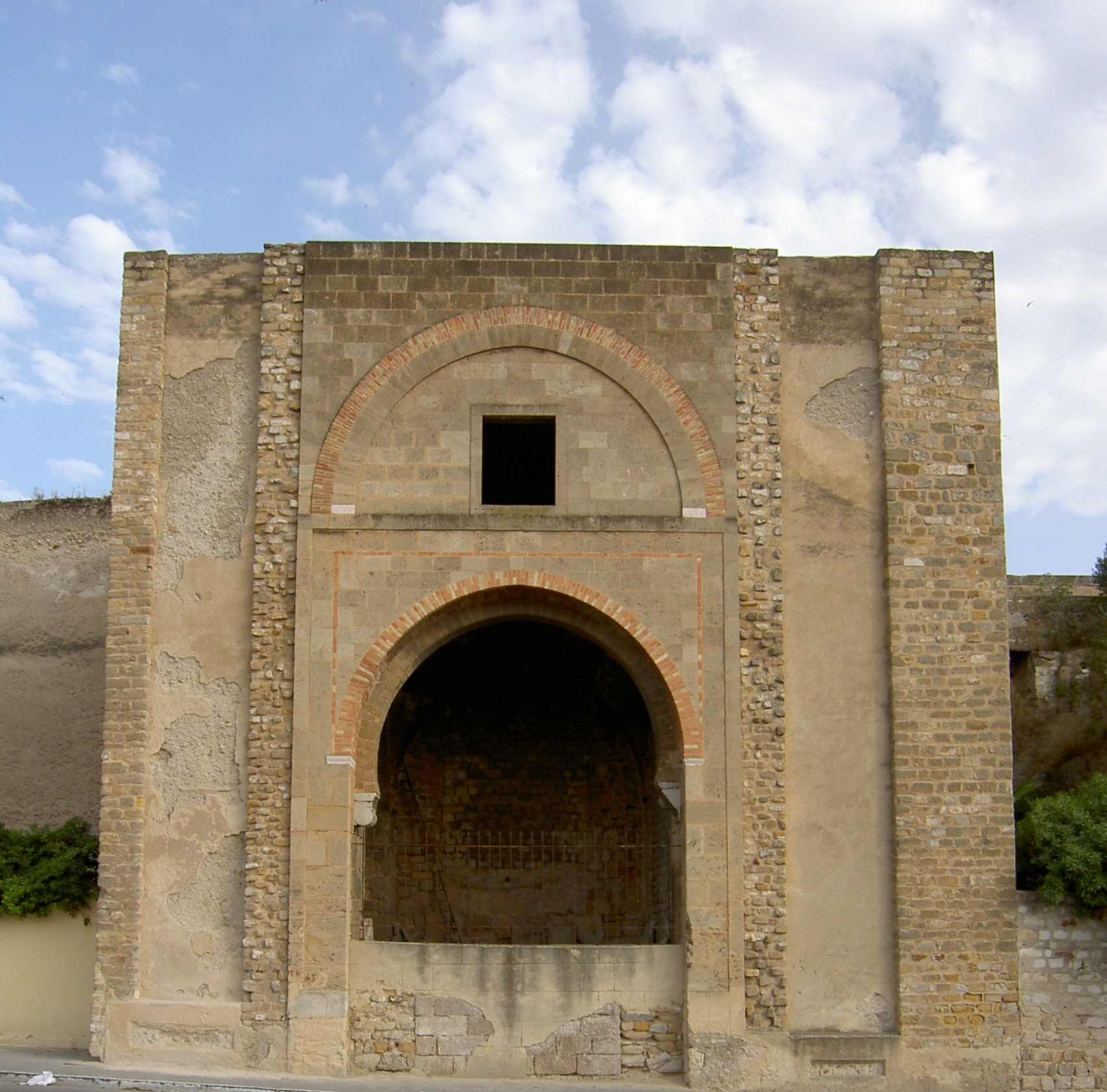
View of Bab Sidi Kacem in 2008

Bab Sidi Kacem (Arabic: باب سيدي قاسم) is one of the gates of the Medina of Tunis, the old capital of Tunisia.

It was built in the Ottoman period at the same time as Bab Laassal, Bab Sidi Abdessalem and Bab El Gorjani. It was named after Sidi Kacem El Jalizzi, a manufacturer of glazed tiles who died in 1497 and was buried nearby.
