= El Ghouri Mosque =

Mosque in Tunis, Tunisia

- مسجد الغوري

Religion
- Affiliation: Islam
- Branch/tradition: Sunni

Location
- Location: Tunis, Tunisia

Architecture
- Type: Mosque

El Ghouri Mosque (Arabic: مسجد الغوري) was a Tunisian mosque located on El Haddanine Street in the Medina of Tunis. It does not exist anymore.

== Etymology ==
It was named after the saint Cheikh Abi Yahia Ben Abi Baker El Ghouri El Safakisi (Arabic: أبي يحيى بن أبي بكر الغوري الصفاقسي), a wise Jurisconsult who lived in the 8th century.
