= Sidi El Baghdadi Mosque =

Mosque in Tunis, Tunisia

- جامع سيدي البغدادي
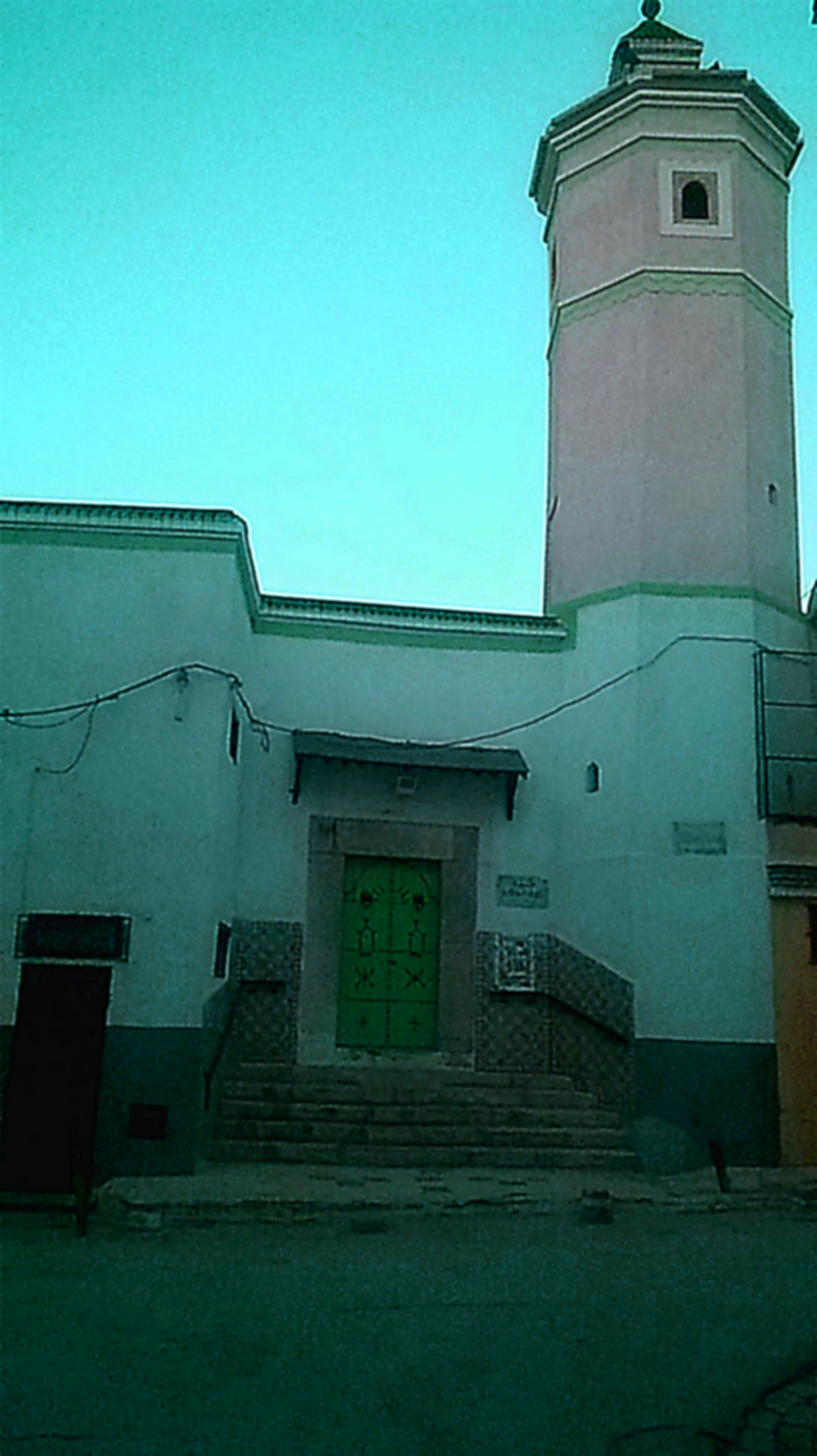

- Location within Tunisia

Religion
- Affiliation: Islam
- Branch/tradition: Sunni

Location
- Location: Tunis, Tunisia
- Interactive map of Sidi El Baghdadi Mosque
- Coordinates: 36.794207°N 10.167643°E

Architecture
- Type: Mosque

Sidi El Baghdadi Mosque (Arabic: جامع سيدي البغدادي) is a mosque in the south-west of the medina of Tunis.

== Localization ==
It is at 15 Sidi El Baghdadi Street, near Bab Mnara, one of the gates of the medina.

== History ==
According to the commemorative plaque at the entrance, the mosque was built in the 13th century, during the Hafsid era.

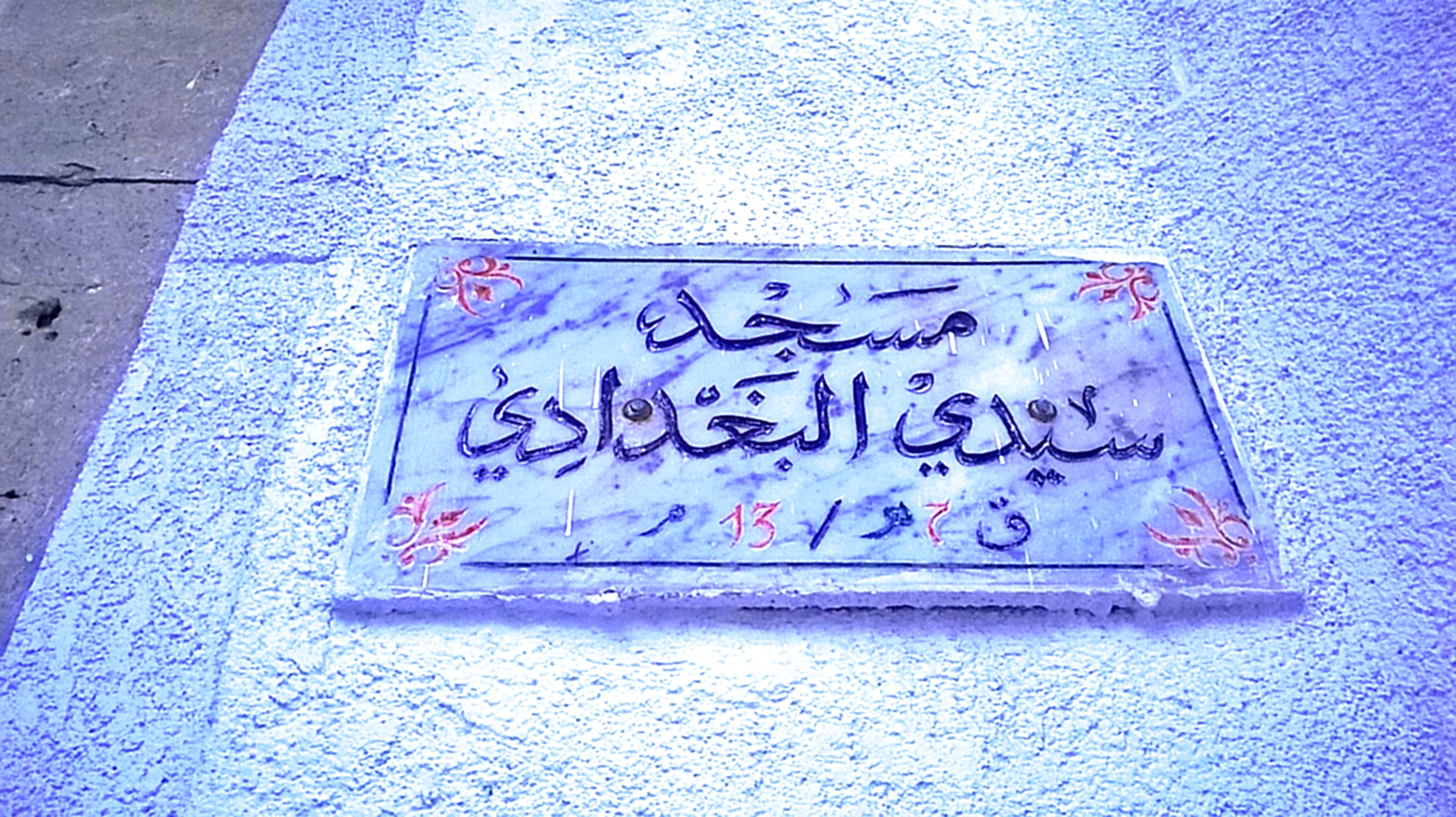
Commemorative plaque of the mosque

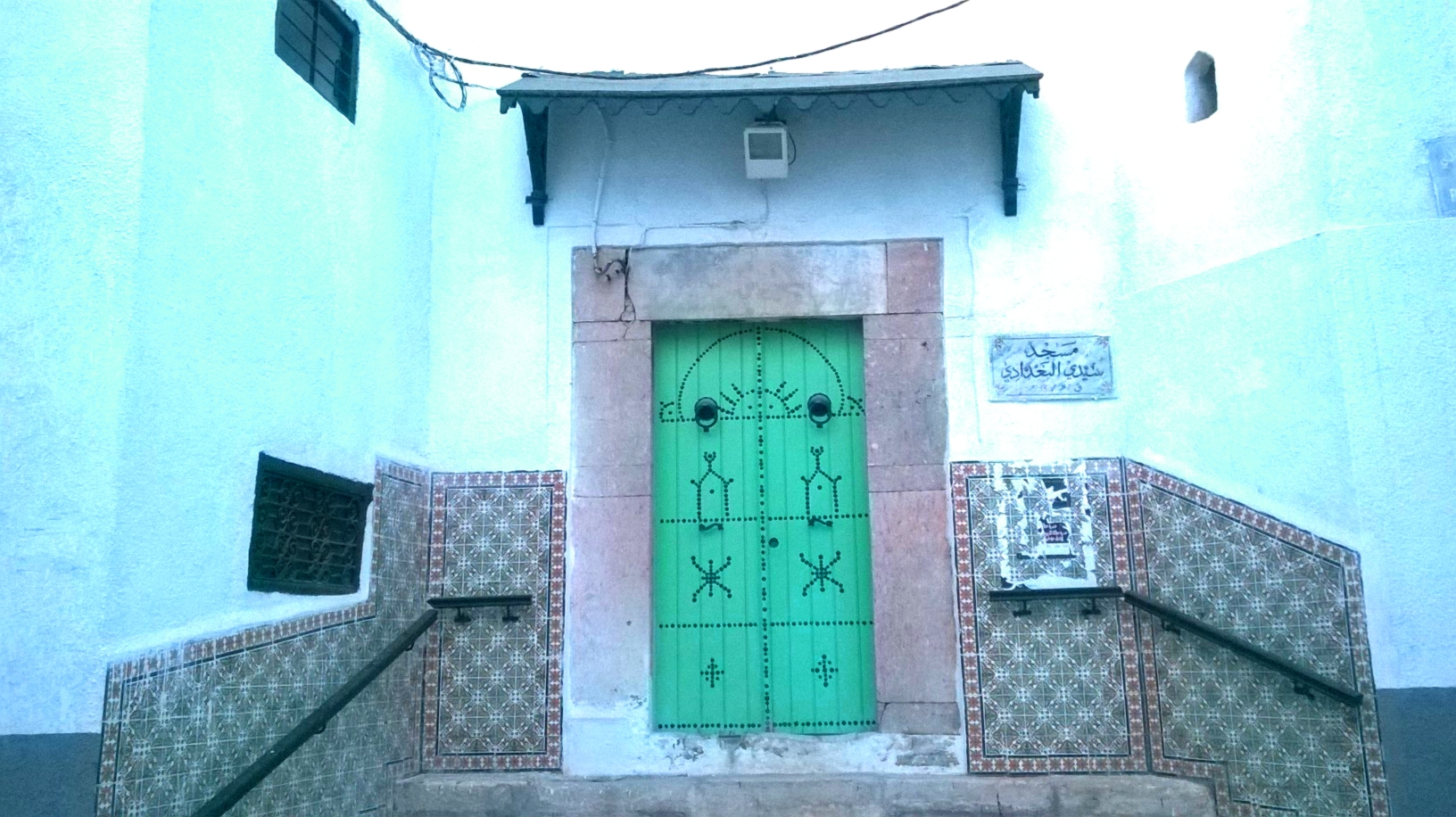
Entrance of the mosque

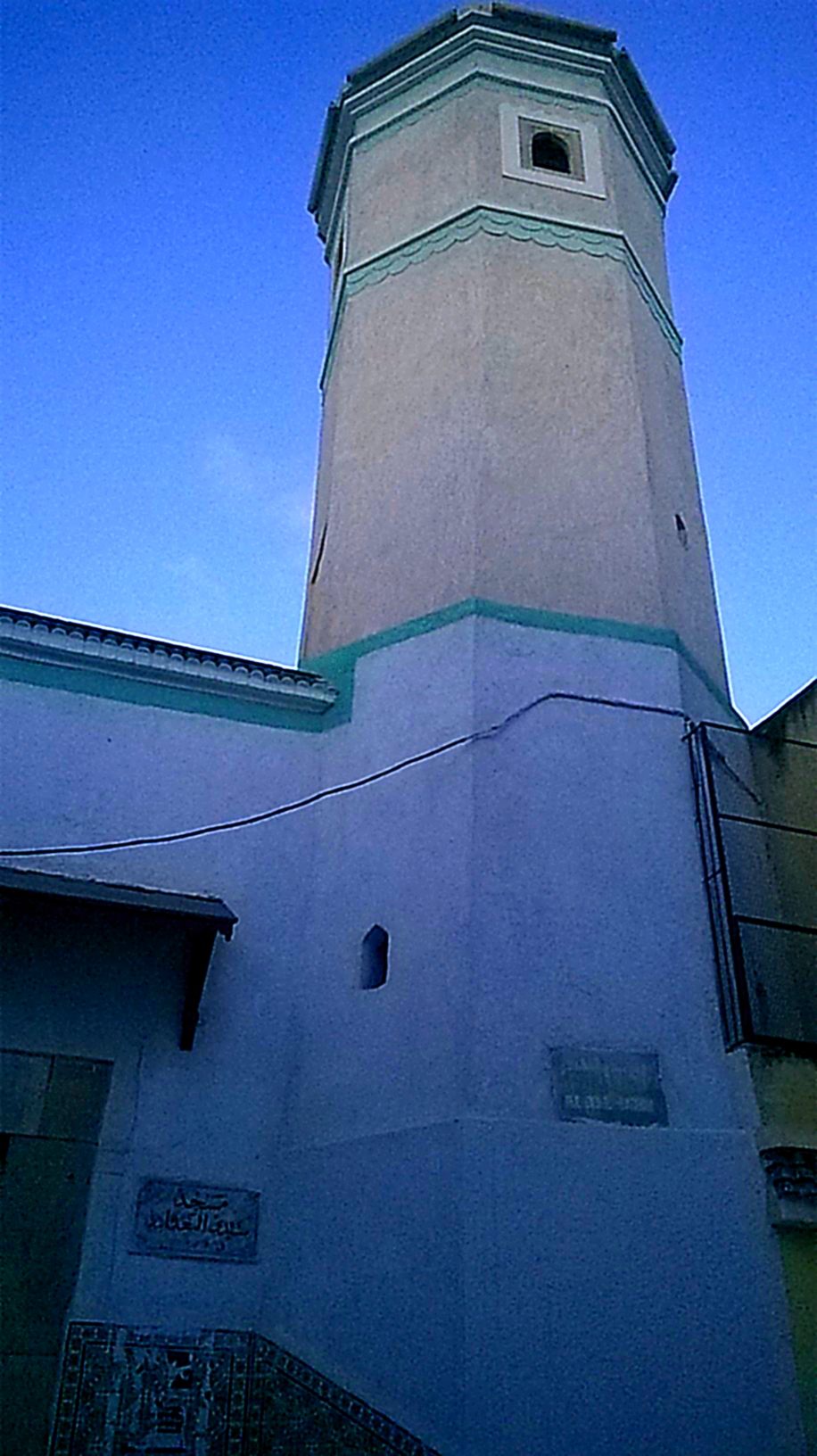
Minaret of the mosque

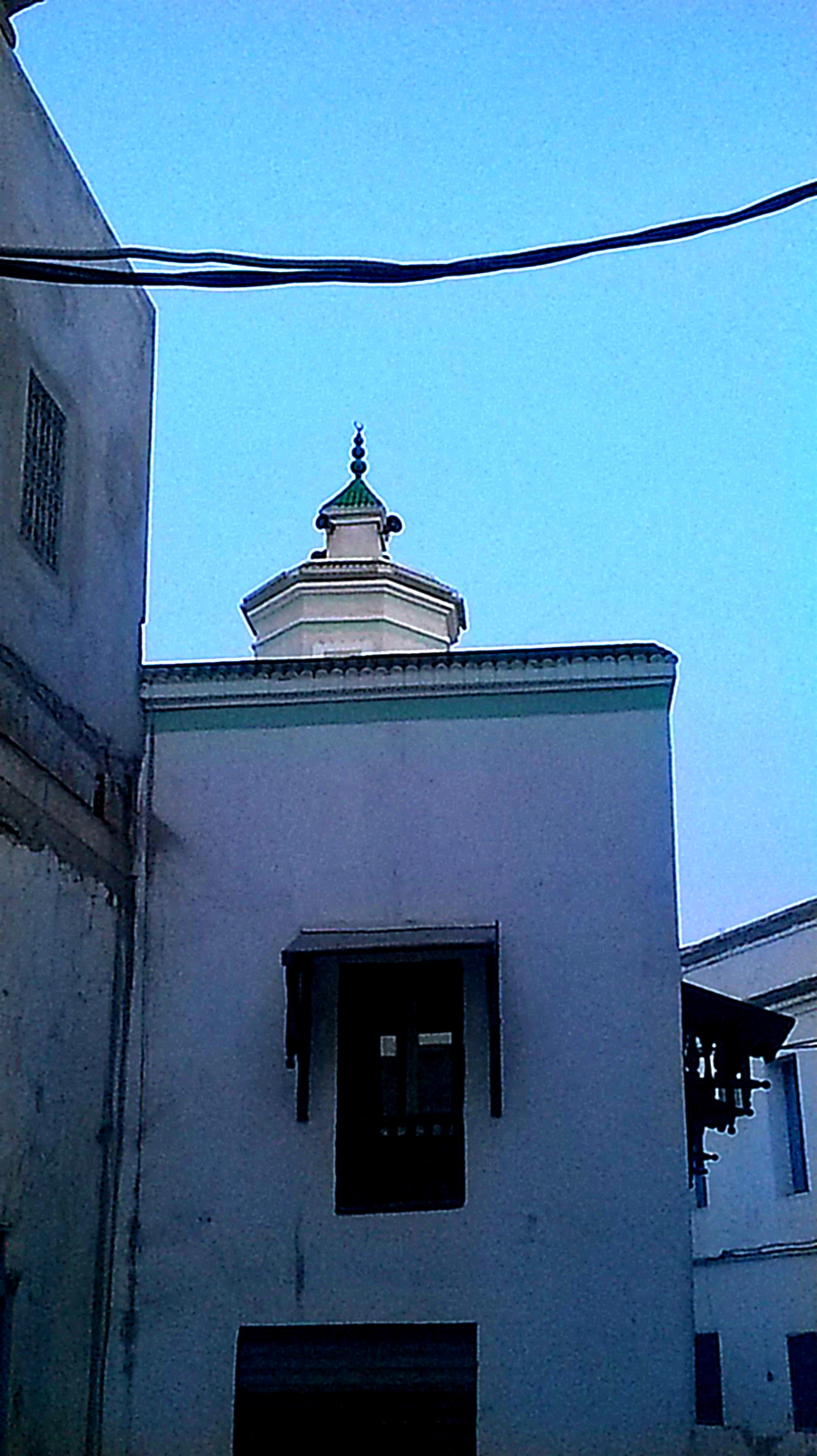
Top of the mosque seen from Boukhris Street
