= Tarchich Mosque =

Mosque in Tunis, Tunisia

- مسجد الصفار

Religion
- Affiliation: Sunni Islam

Location
- Location: Tunis, Tunisia

Architecture
- Type: Mosque

Tarchich Mosque (Arabic: مسجد الصفار), is a Tunisian mosque located in the east of the medina of Tunis. It does not exist anymore.

== Localization ==
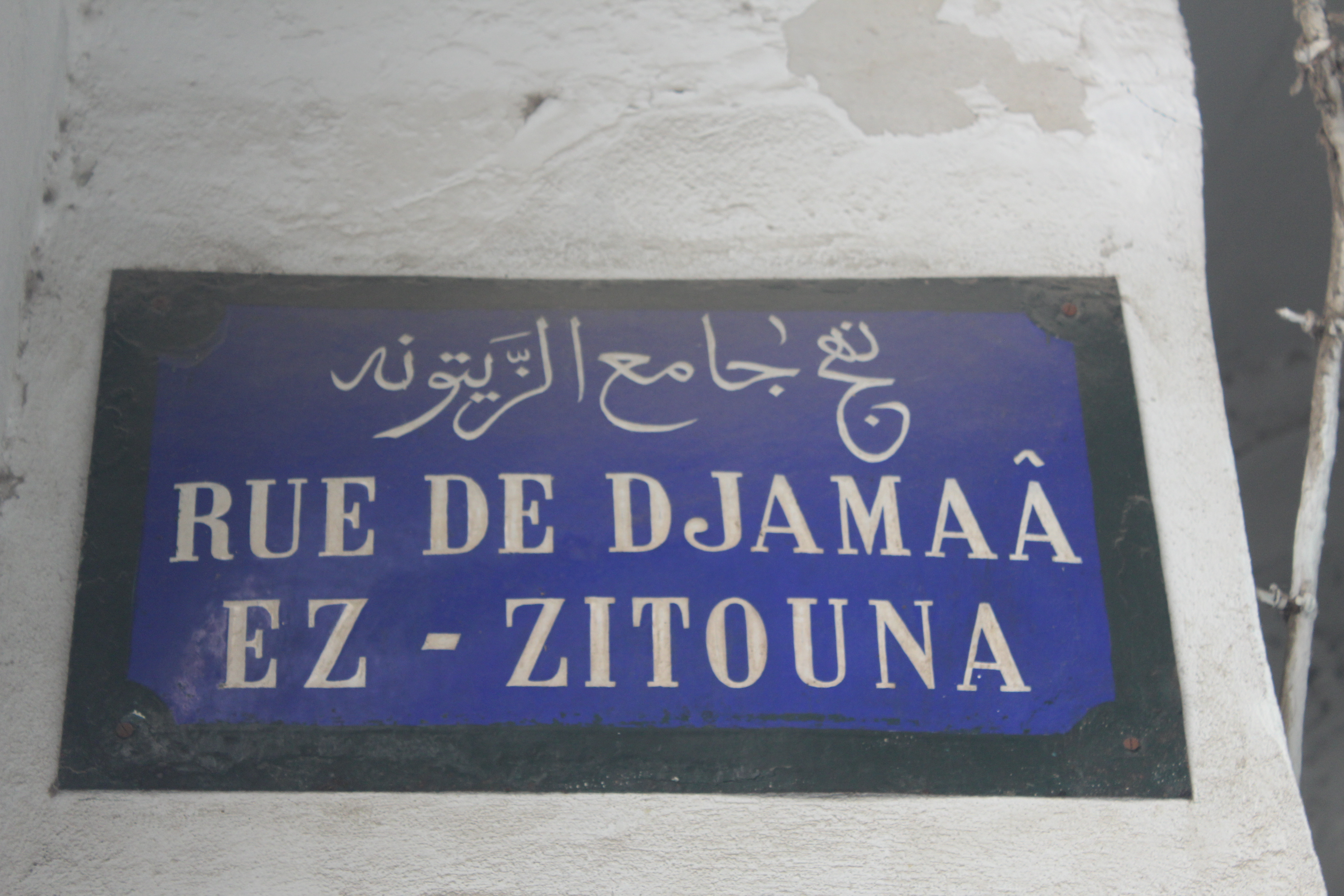
Metallic plaque of Jemaa Ezzitouna Street

The mosque was located in The church's Street, the present Jemaa Ezzitouna Street.

== Etymology ==
The word Tarchich comes from the Hebrew language word Tâarchich, one of Tunisia's old names.
