= Dar Bach Hamba =

Monument in Tunisia

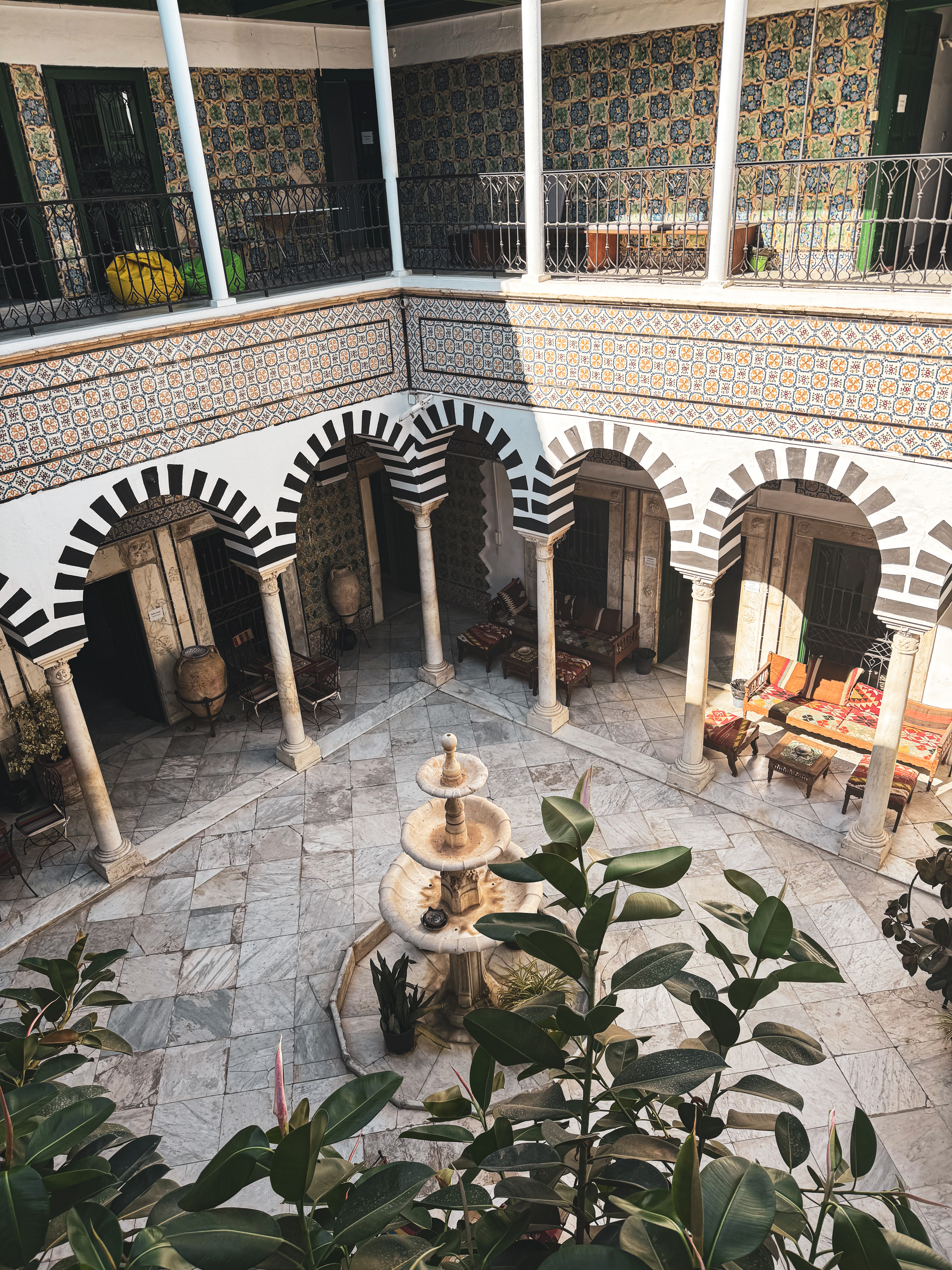
- Courtyard of Dar Bach Hamba
- Interactive map of the Dar Bach Hamba area

General information
- Type: Palace
- Location: Medina of Tunis, Tunis, Tunisia
- Year built: 17th Century
- Client: Ahmed Bach Hamba

Design and construction
- Architects: Ottoman architecture Moorish architecture

== Location ==
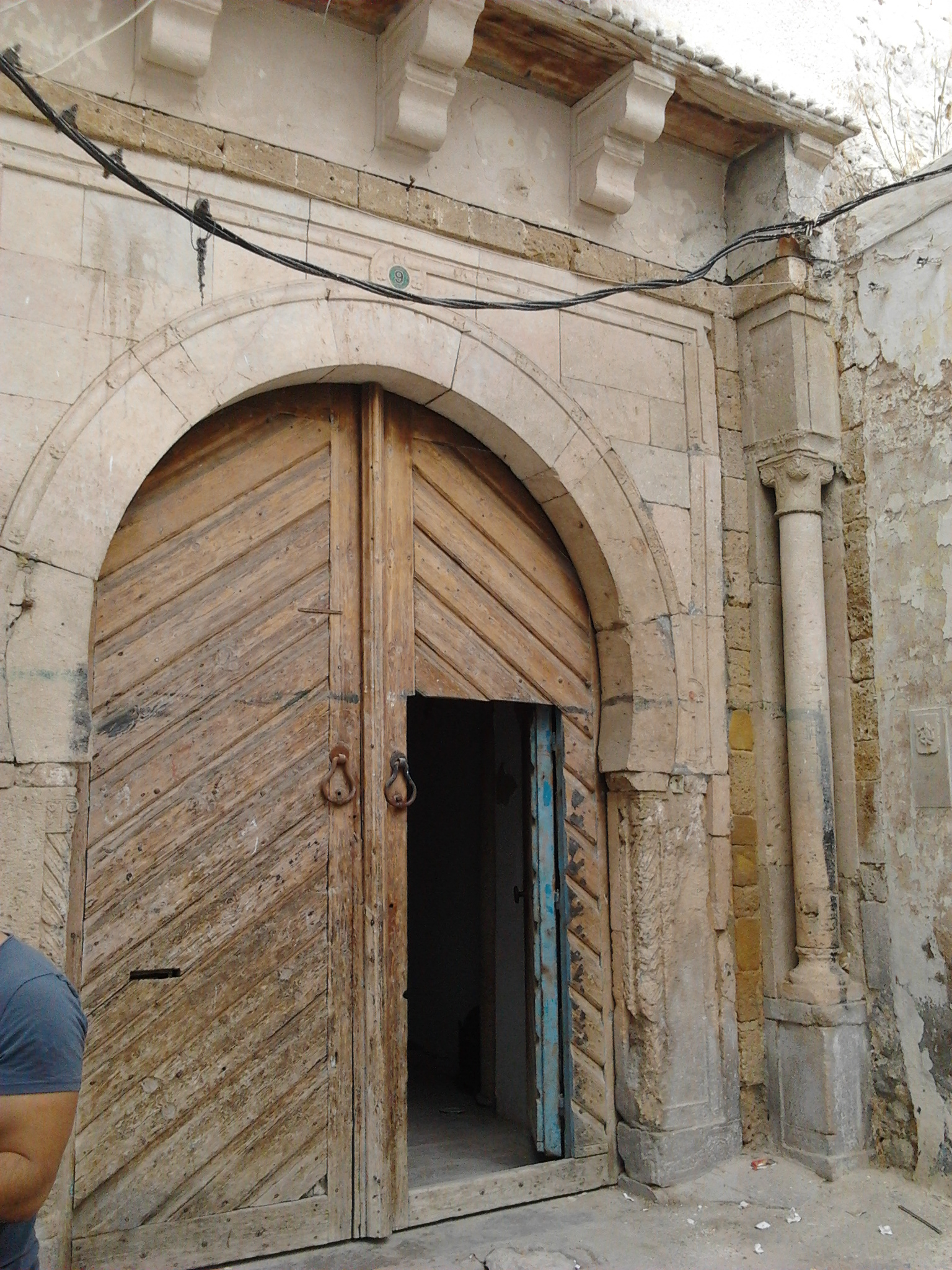
Dar Bach Hamba

Dar Bach Hamba is a monument of an old palace in the medina of Tunis, Tunisia.

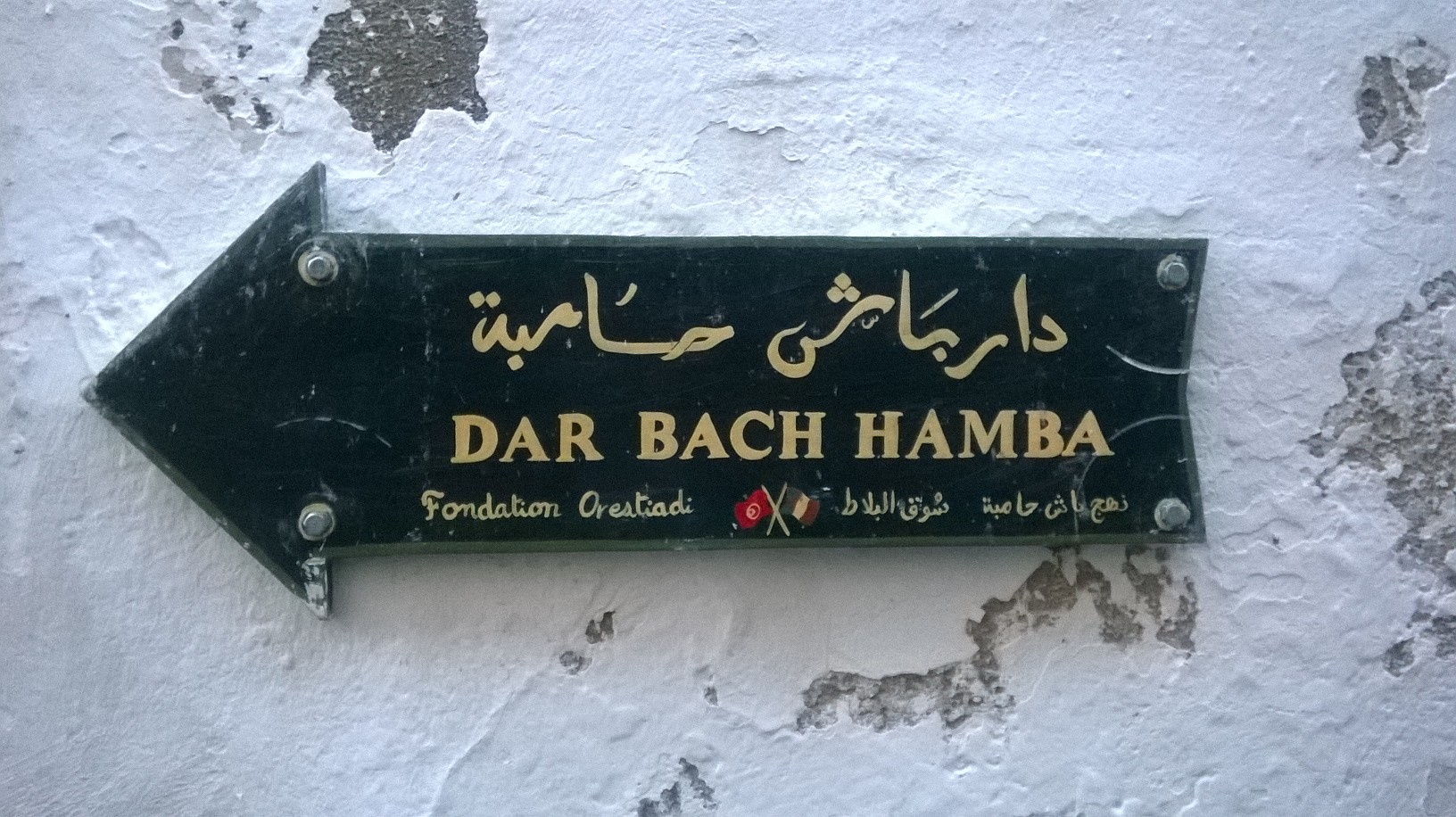
Dar Bech Hamba

== History ==
Dar Bach Hamba has witnessed many modifications in its architecture through the decades that made it one of the richest palaces in the medina. Yet, these modifications made it very difficult for historians to get precise information about the date of its foundation that is estimated to be in the 17th century.

The palace was founded by the Rassa family (coming from Tlemcen since the Hafsid dynasty). Later, during the 18th century, the Naccache family bought it. In 1789, Haj Ahmed Bach Hamba bought it in the reign of Hammuda ibn Ali and gave it its name. The palace later became a property of French sisters who used it as a school during the French protectorate of Tunisia.

== Architecture ==
From the 17th to the 18th century, the palace was a house for craftsmen. It has been considered to be a first class residence (like those belonging to the bourgeois and the nobles of the medina). The palace has its own turba at Sidi Tijani Street and another house (Dar Bakir) is annexed to it.

It has a classical architectural plan as have most of the palaces in the medina in Tunis (Dar Lasram, Dar Ben Abdallah, Dar Ben Hassine, etc.) with a patio surrounded by four richly decorated rooms on each side. Yet, unlike other palaces where the porticoes are built face to face, Dar Bach Hamba has a portico on the northern side and another one on the eastern one. One of the four rooms was converted into a chapel in 1932.

== Activities ==
Until 2015, Dar Bach Hamba was the office of the Orestiadi Foundation and the venue for a permanent exhibition of costumes, stuccos and terracottas from all Mediterranean countries. The idea of this exposition was inspired from the model at the Museo delle Trame Mediterranee, and its goal was to show the commonality in Mediterranean cultures and communities.

Since July 2015, the palace hosts the L'Art Rue association that develops artistic projects promoting local heritage. Dar Bach Hamba is also the venue of many artistic workshops for children, for concerts, and for artistic residences.
