= Bab Sidi Abdessalem =

- Arabic: باب سيدي عبد السلام
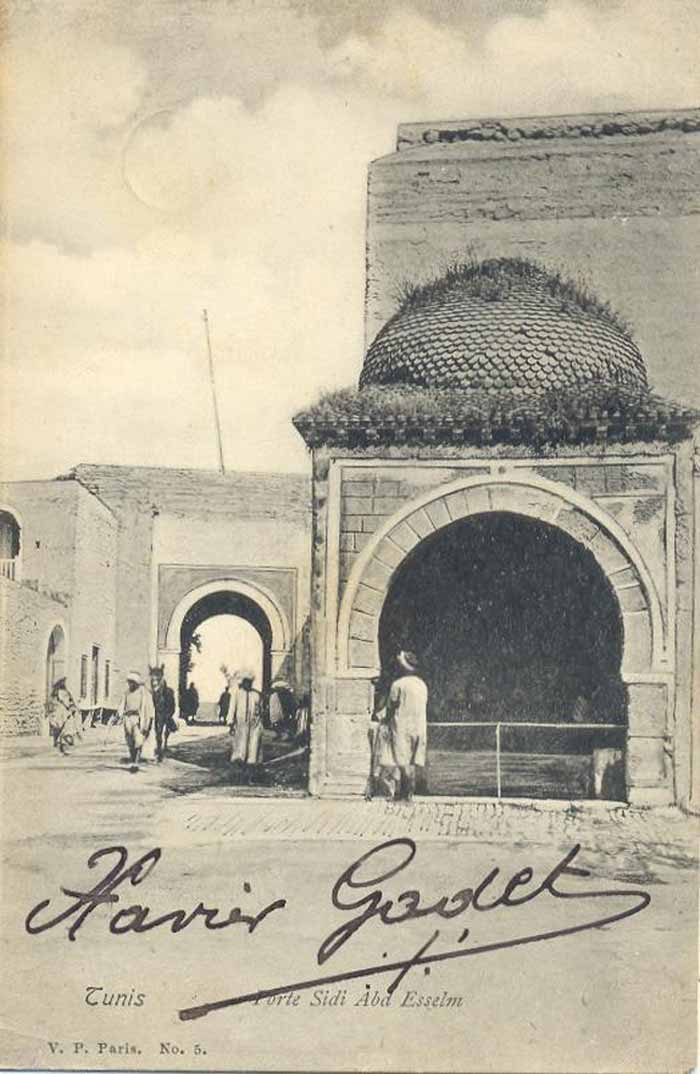
- View of Bab Sidi Abdessalem and the hafsid fountain in 1890
- Etymology: named for Abd As-Salam Al-Asmar

General information
- Town or city: Tunis
- Country: Tunisia
- Coordinates: 36.810194°N 10.164083°E
- Year(s) built: during the reign of Hammouda Pasha (1782–1814)

Bab Sidi Abdessalem (Arabic: باب سيدي عبد السلام) is one of the gates of the medina of Tunis.

It was built in the reign of Hammouda Pasha, it takes its name from Abd As-Salam Al-Asmar, a holy man from Libya.

A Hafsid fountain and a souk are located near the gate.
