= Bab Bnet =

- Arabic: باب البنات
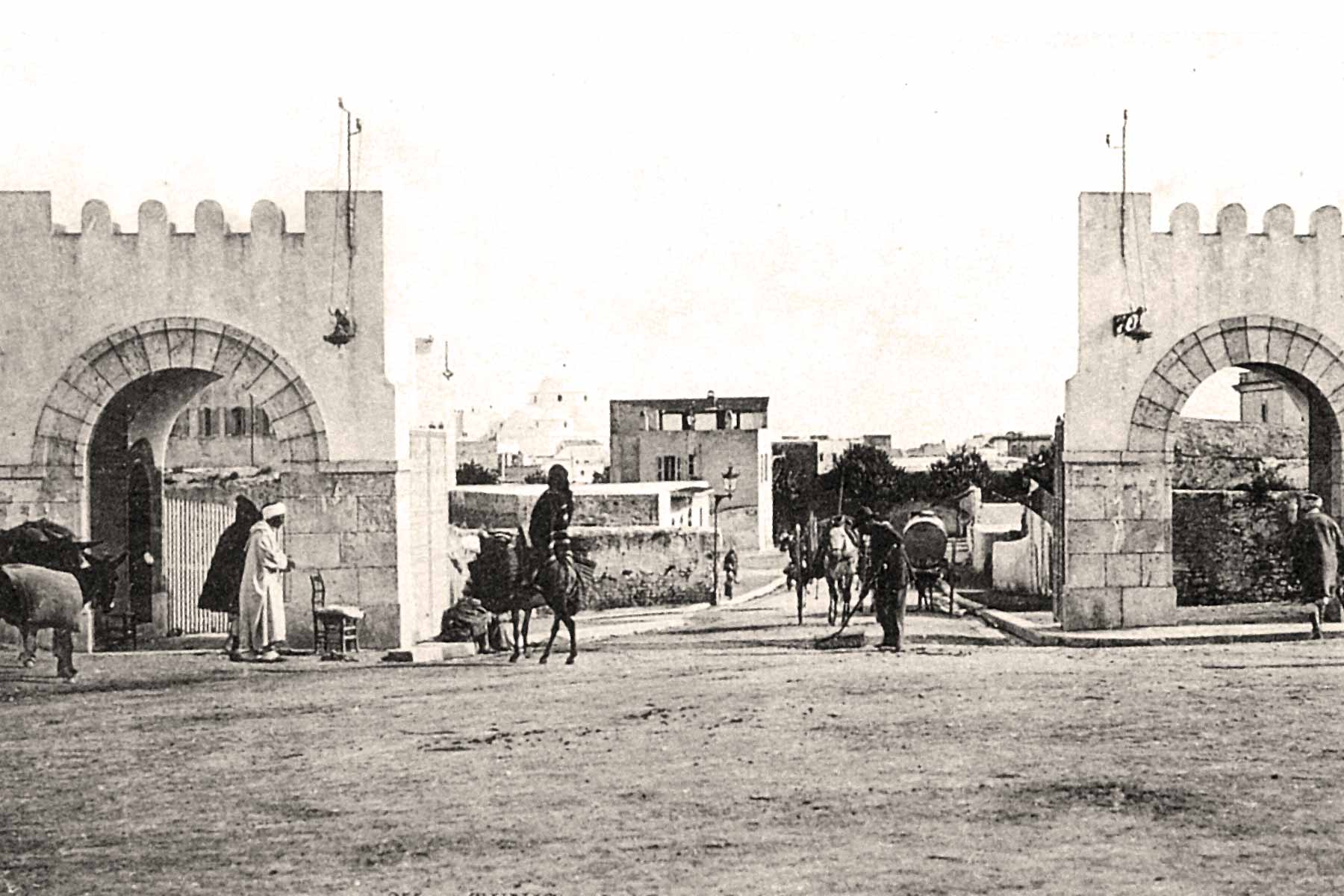
- Bab Bnet in 1914
- Etymology: "Gate of the young girls", for the adoptive daughters of Abu Zakariya

General information
- Town or city: Tunis
- Country: Tunisia
- Coordinates: 36.803863°N 10.166103°E

Bab Bnet, or Bab El Benet (Arabic: باب البنات) was one of the gates of the medina of Tunis, the capital of Tunisia. The founder of the Hafsid dynasty, Abu Zakariya, had a palace near this gate in the 13th century. He captured three of his rival's daughters and raised them as his daughters in the palace near this gate. As a result, the gate was named for the girls, as Bnet translates to the "young girls".

The gate has since been destroyed, but a boulevard near the gate's location retains the Bab Bnet name.
