= Bab El Jazira =

- Arabic: باب الجزيرة
- Etymology: the island/peninsula, as it faces Cape Bon

General information
- Town or city: Tunis
- Country: Tunisia
- Coordinates: 36.793028°N 10.176806°E

Bab El Jazira, Bab Al Djazira or Bab Dzira (Arabic: باب الجزيرة), in English "gate of the peninsula/island", was one of the gates of the medina of Tunis.

It was on the southern side of the medina, connecting to the road to Cape Bon, the peninsula enclosing the eastern edge of the Gulf of Tunis. It also led to the souk of the dyers.

It was destroyed under the French occupation, and its role as a southern gate of the medina was largely replaced by the Bab Alioua.
