= Bab El Allouj =

- Arabic: باب العلوج
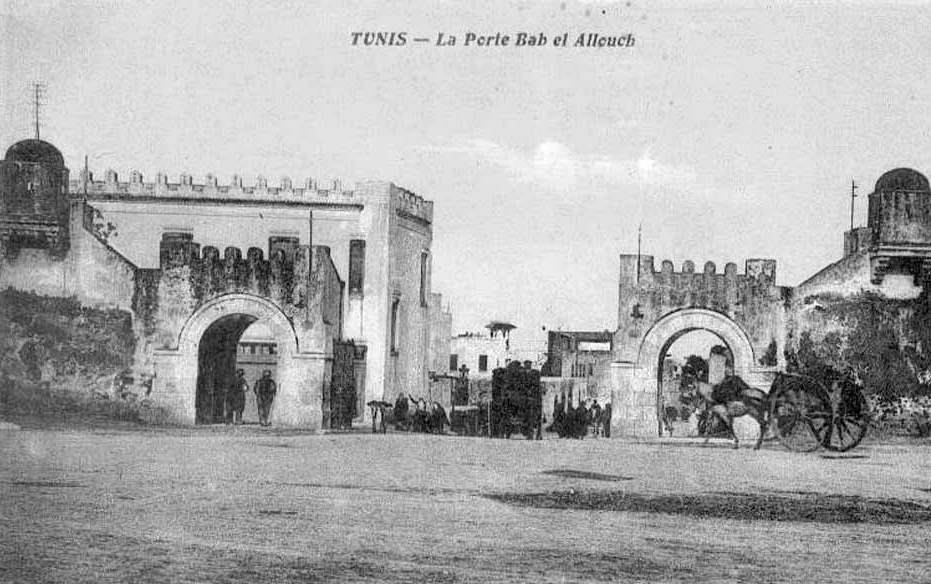
- Bab El Allouj in 1900

General information
- Town or city: Tunis
- Country: Tunisia
- Coordinates: 36.803007°N 10.16524°E

Bab El Allouj (Arabic: باب العلوج) is one of the gates of the medina of Tunis. Built under the Hafsid sultan Abū lshâq Ibrâhîm al-Mustansir (1349–1369), it was originally named Bab er-Rehiba or "the small esplanade gate", after a long avenue between two of the medina's walls.

In 1435, it took the name of Bab El Allouj, when Sultan Abu Amr Uthman brought his mother's family from Italy (his mother was a former Italian captive) and installed her in the esplanade quarter. The gate which became Rahbat El Allouj, allouj (in the singular alij), describing white foreigners and often Christian slaves.
