= Bab Sidi Abdallah Cherif =

- Arabic: باب سيدي عبد الله الشريف
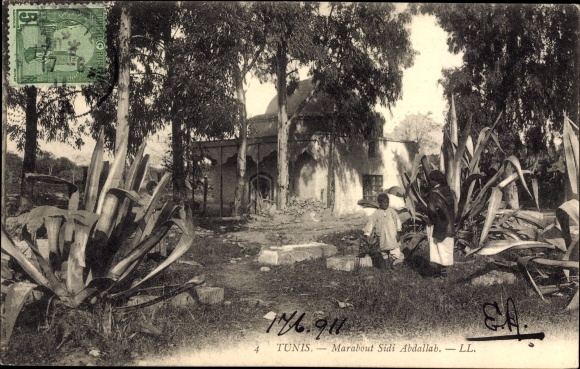
- Old postcard showing the mausoleum of Sidi Abdallah Cherif
- Etymology: named for Sidi Abdallah Cherif

General information
- Status: Destroyed
- Location: Tunis, Tunisia

Bab Sidi Abdallah Cherif (Arabic: باب سيدي عبد الله الشريف) was one of the gates of the medina of Tunis, the capital of Tunisia. It was situated at the south-western extremity of the kasbah, but has been destroyed.

It was also called Bab El Ghedar (Arabic: باب الغدر) which means "Gate of the treason".

== Etymology ==
This gate takes its name from a saint, Sidi Abdallah Cherif, whose tomb is nearby, outside the medina of Tunis's rampart.
