= Medina of Tunis =

Old city of Tunis, Tunisia

UNESCO World Heritage Site
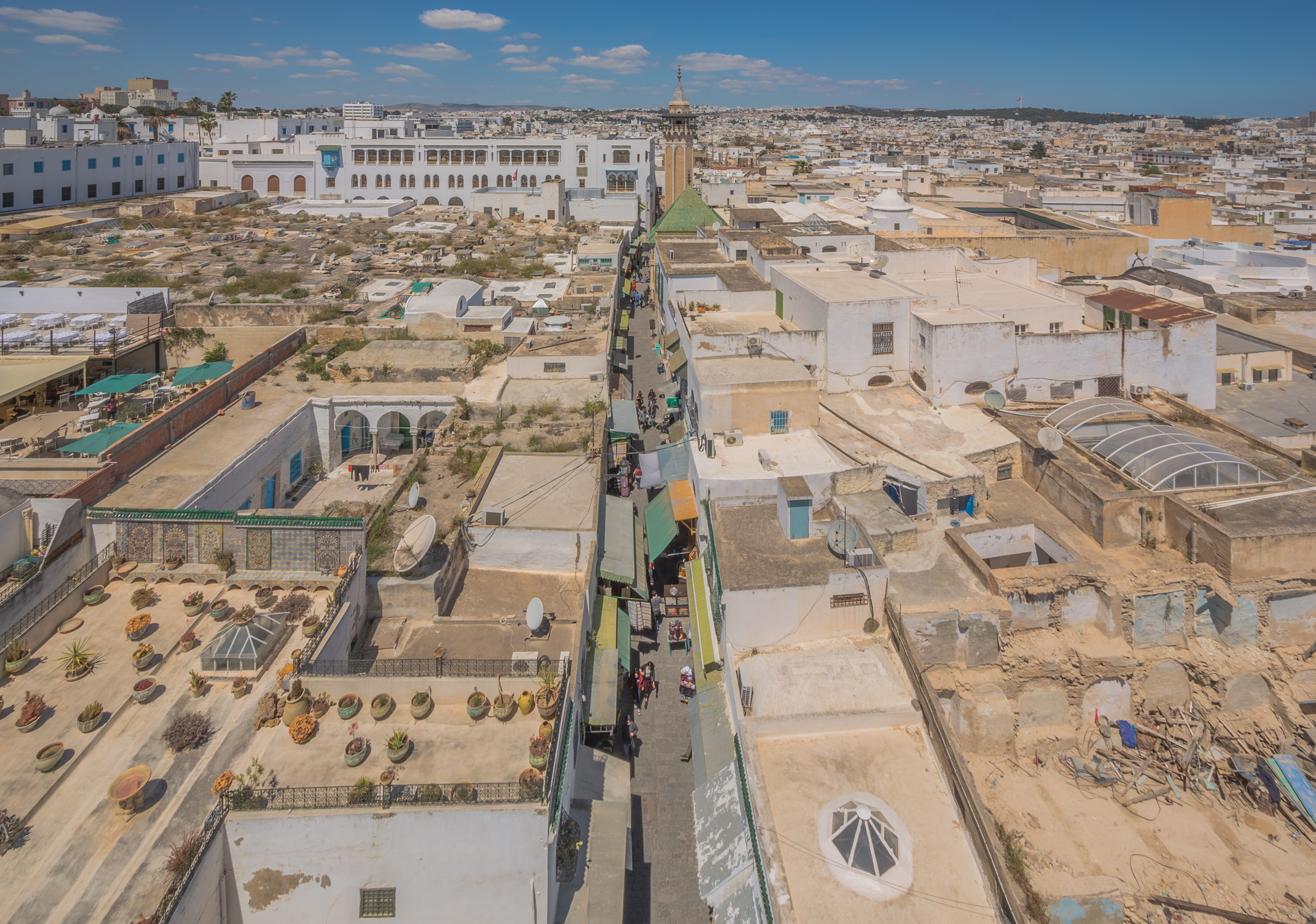
- Roofs of the Medina

- Location within Tunisia
- Location: Tunis, Tunisia
- Criteria: Cultural: (ii), (iii), (v)
- Reference: 36
- Inscription: 1979 (3rd Session)
- Extensions: 2010
- Area: 296.41 ha (732.4 acres)
- Buffer zone: 190.19 ha (470.0 acres)
- Coordinates: 36°49′N 10°10′E

The Medina of Tunis is the medina quarter of Tunis, the capital of Tunisia. It has been a UNESCO World Heritage Site since 1979.

The Medina contains some 700 monuments, including palaces, mosques, mausoleums, madrasas and fountains dating from various periods.

== History ==
Founded in 698 around the original core of the Zitouna Mosque, the Medina of Tunis developed throughout the Middle Ages. The main axis was between the mosque and the centre of government to the west in the kasbah. To the east this same main road extended to the Bab el Bhar. Expansions to the north and south divided the main Medina into two suburbs north (Bab Souika) and south (Bab El Jazira).

Before the Almohad Caliphate, other cities such as Mahdia and Kairouan had served as capitals. Under Almohad rule, Tunis became the capital of Ifriqiya, and under the Hafsid period it developed into a religious, intellectual and economic center. It was during the Hafsid period that the Medina as we now know it took on its essential form. It gradually acquired a number of buildings and monuments combining the styles of Ifriqiya, Andalusian and Oriental influences, but also borrowing some of the columns and capitals of Roman and Byzantine monuments.

== Social and urban structure ==
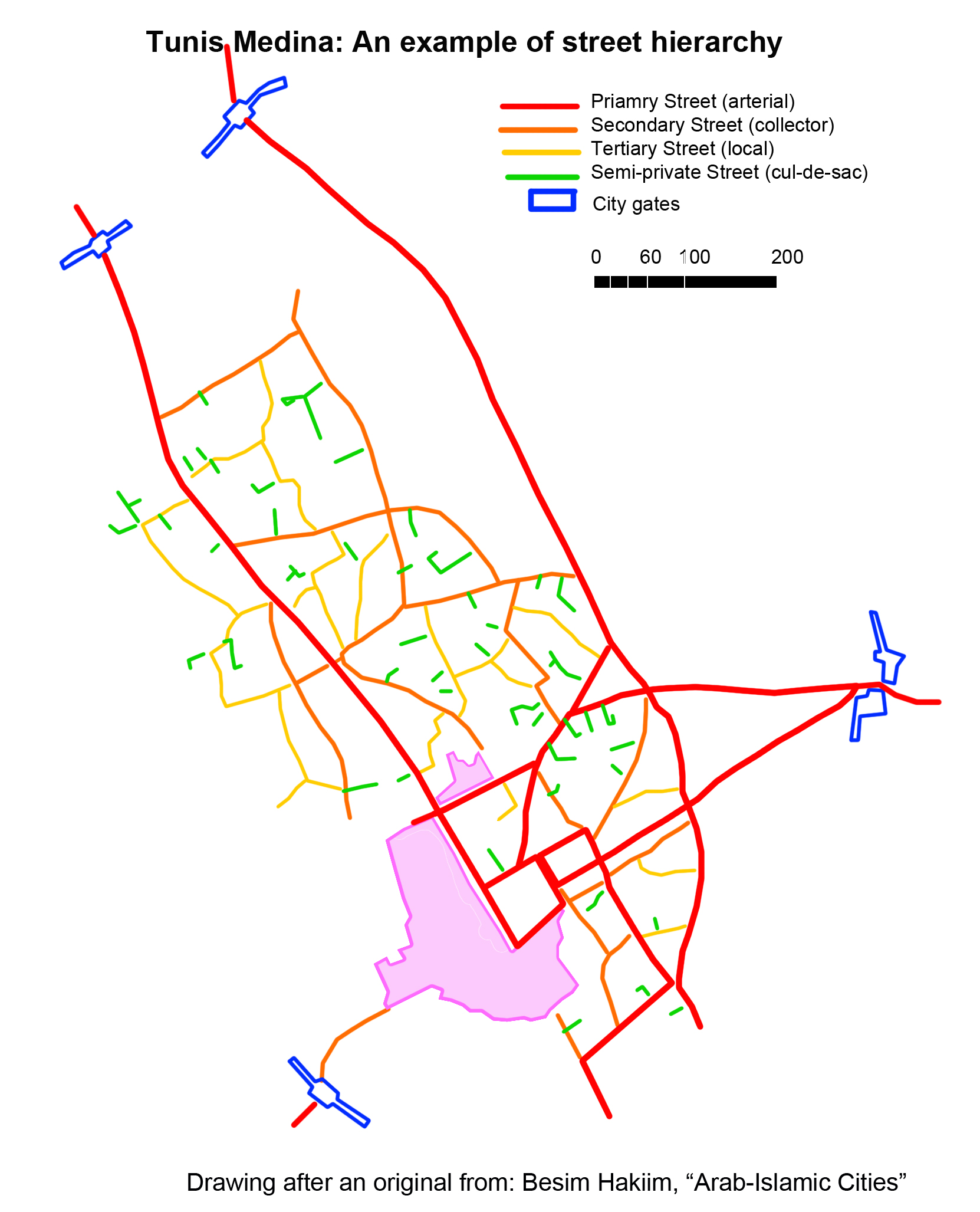
Street network of the Tunis medina

With an area of 270 hectares (670 acres) (plus 29 hectares (72 acres) for the district of the kasbah) and nearly 110,000 inhabitants, the Medina has one-tenth of the population of Tunis and a sixth of the urbanized area of the agglomeration.

The complex organization of the urban fabric fueled an entire colonial literature of the dangerous Medina, anarchic and chaotic, and the territory of ambush. However, since the 1930s, with the arrival of the first ethnologists, studies have revealed that the articulation of the Medina areas is not random, and houses are built according to clear sociocultural norms, codified according to complex types of human relationships. Many publications have detailed the development of the Medina model and system of prioritization of public and private spaces, residential and commercial, sacred and profane.

The urban layout of the Medina of Tunis has the distinction of not obeying geometrical layouts or formal compositions such as gridlines. Nevertheless the north-south and east-west axes are comparable to a Roman cardo and decumanus (Sidi Ben Arous, Jemaa Zitouna and Pasha Streets) that intersect at the court of Zitouna mosque, house of prayer and studies. The thoroughfares include the main streets; secondary streets and finally, small cul-de-sacs. Sometimes entire private spots are reserved for women. The built environment is generally characterized by the juxtaposition of large plots (600 m^{2}) and joint ownership.

The concept of public space is ambiguous in the Medina where the streets are considered as the extension of houses and subject to social tags. The notion of individual ownership is low and displays in the souks often spill out onto the highway. This idea is reinforced by the area of a shop (about 3 m^{2}) and bedroom (10 m^{2}).

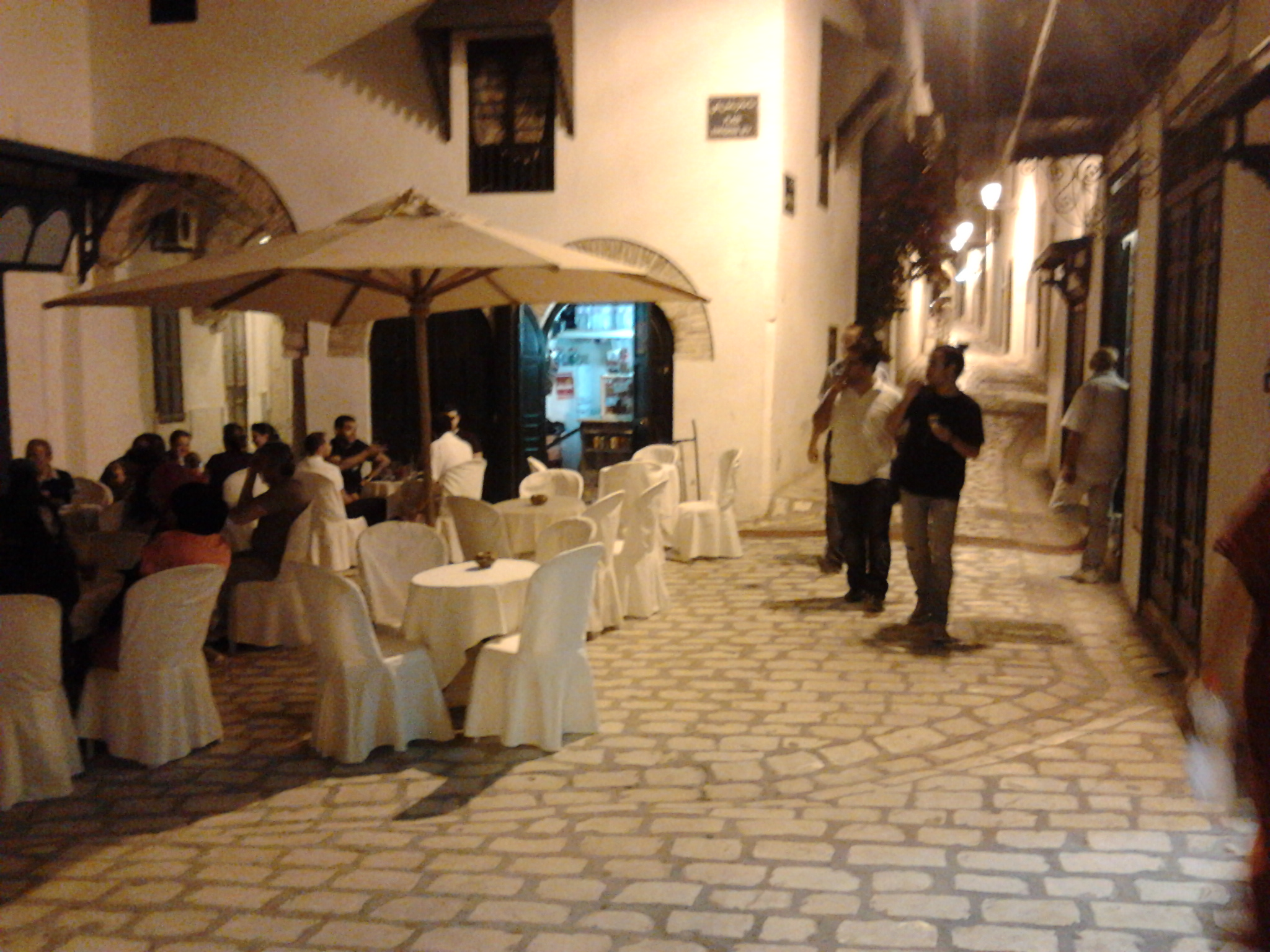
Evening at Ramdhane Bey Square

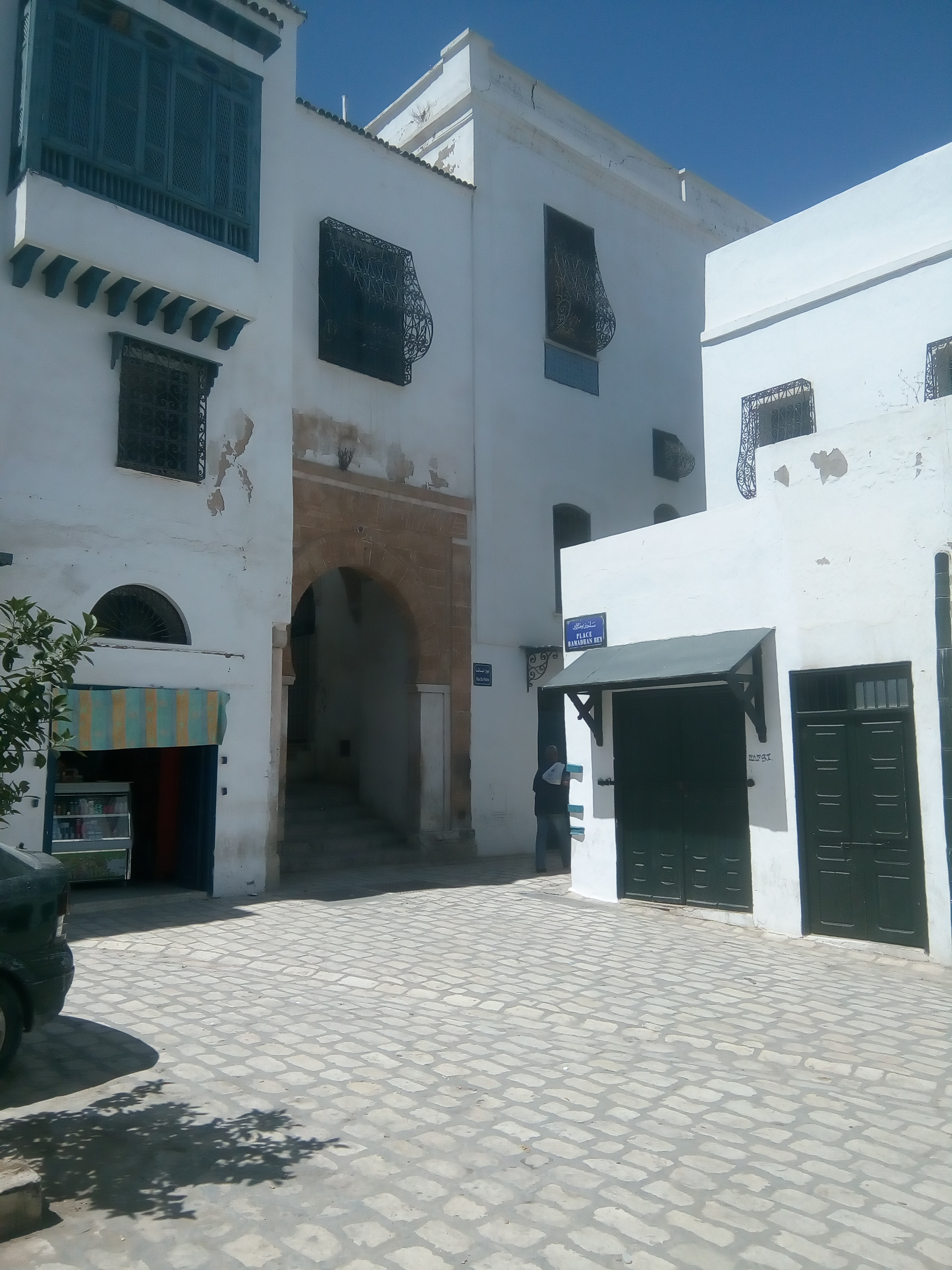
Ramdhane Bey Square

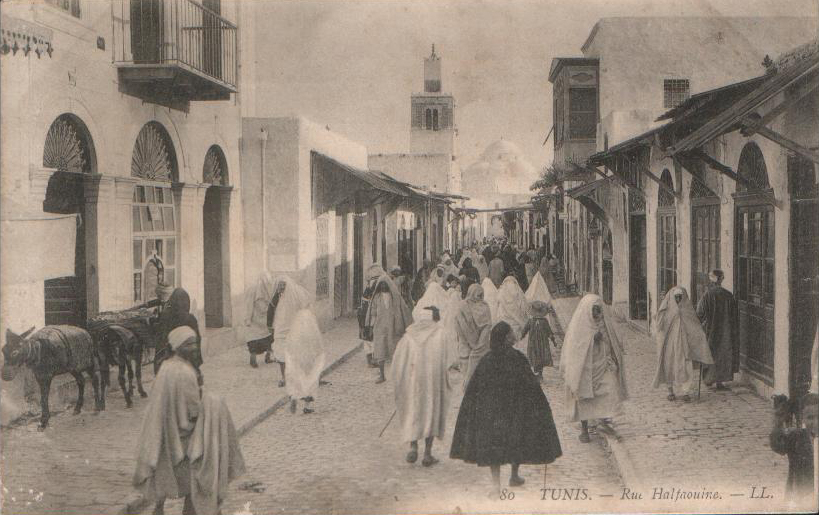
El Halfaouine street

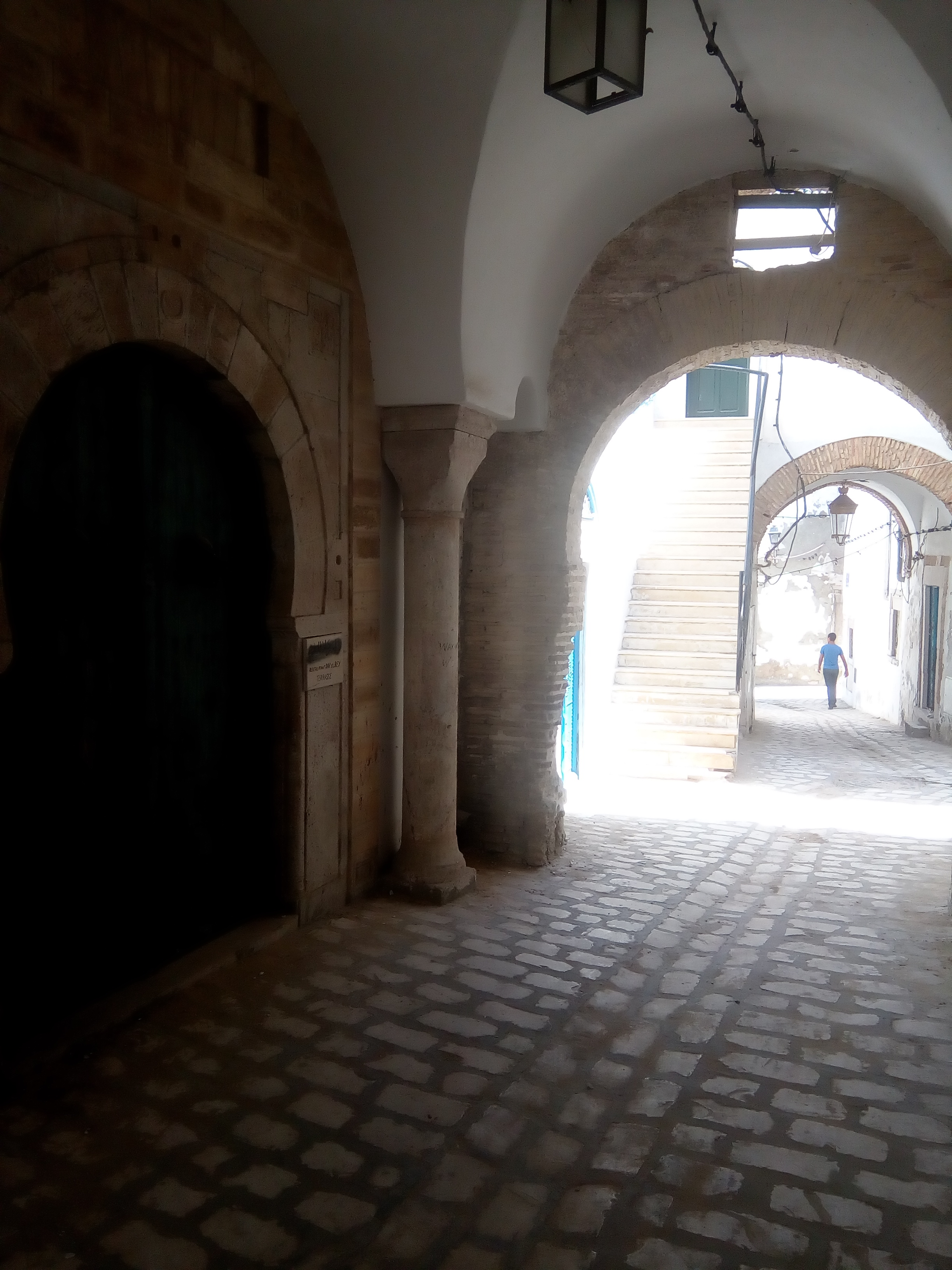
Bir lahjar Street

In the case of domestic architecture, the more a building is set back from the shops, the more it is valued. The concept of withdrawal and privacy is paramount. The late introduction of a sewer system means that much waste water still flows through the streets of the Medina. The largest houses and noble places are generally located in the district with the highest elevation, the Kasbah quarter. The roof terraces of the Medina are also an important place for social life, as illustrated by the film Halfaouine by Férid Boughedir.

Nowadays, every district retains its culture and rivalries can be strong. Thus, the northern suburb supports the football club Espérance Sportive de Tunis while the southern side is the district of the rival Club Africain. The Medina has also witnessed a social segmentation: the districts of Tourbet el Bey and the kasbah are wealthier, with a population of judges and politicians, Pasha street is the military and the bourgeoisie (merchants and notables), and smaller communities such as Hafisa where the Jewish population have traditionally lived.

== Architecture ==
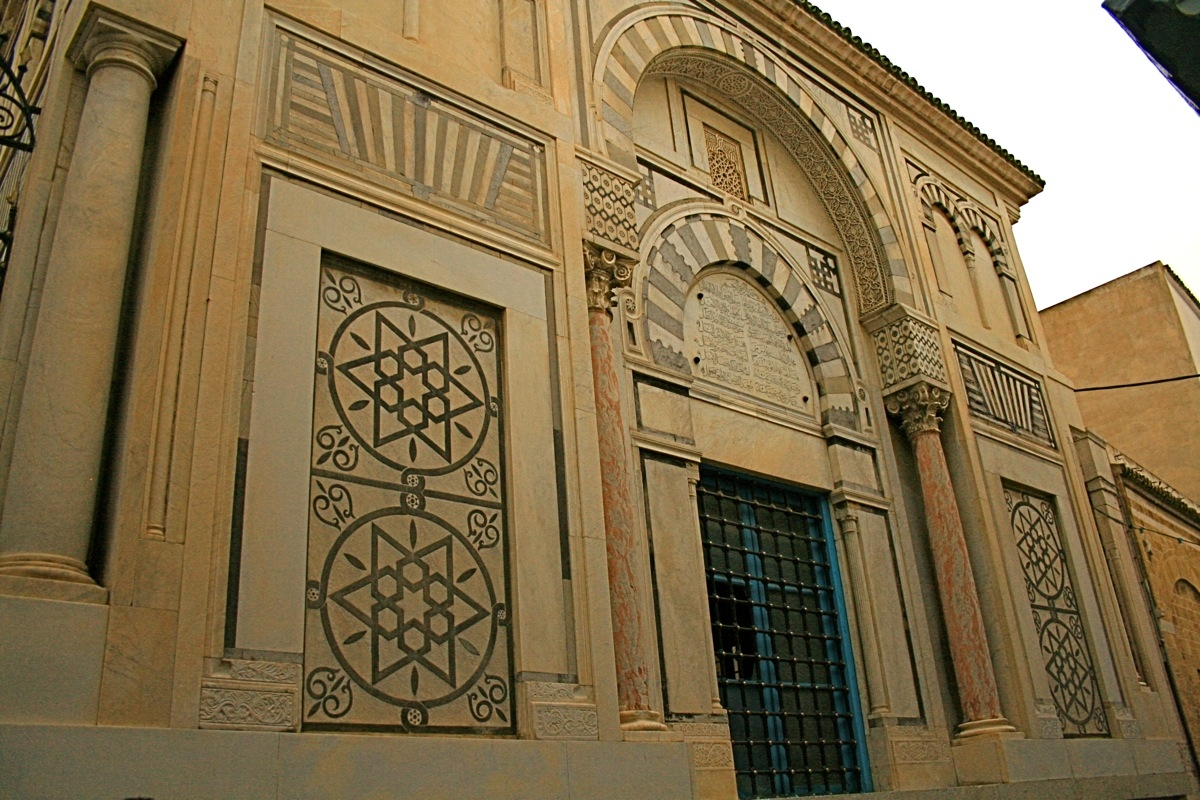
Facade of the mausoleum of Hammouda Pasha, part of his mosque

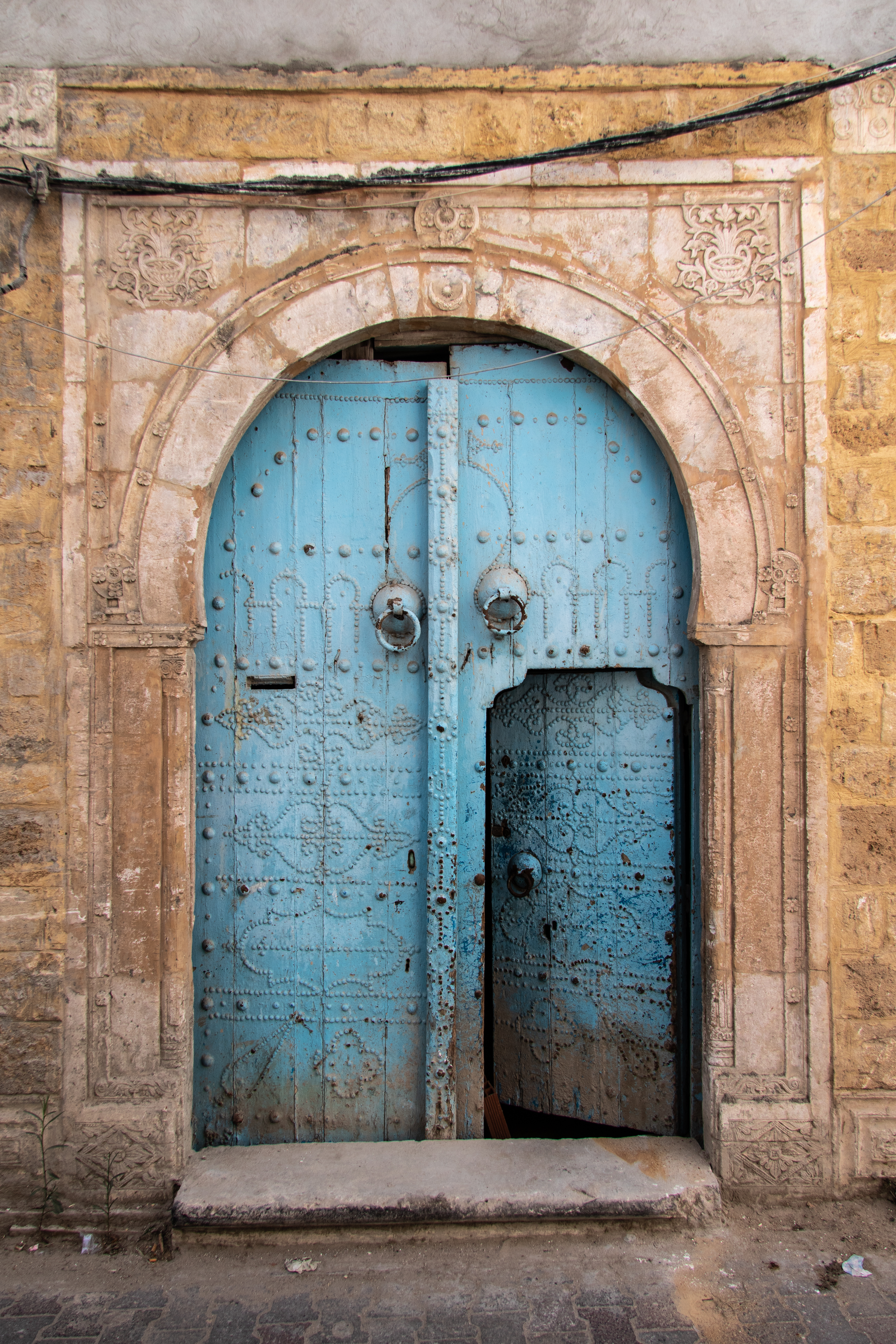
Door in the medina

The Muradid dynasty were great builders in the Medina. Hammouda Pasha (1631–1666) was responsible for the construction of many souks in the Medina, as well as many palaces, including the Dar Hammouda Pacha and the predecessor of the modern Dar El Bey. In 1655, he had Ottoman architects build the Hammouda Pacha Mosque in the Turkish style, with an elegant octagonal minaret, below which he constructed his family mausoleum. His son Murad II Bey (1666–1675) built the Mouradia Madrasah, dedicated to the Maliki school of Islamic law. Murad's son Mohamed Bey El Mouradi (1686–1696) built several monuments in Tunis including the (Sidi Mahrez Mosque), modelled on the mosques of Istanbul with a great central dome.

The Husainid ruler Ali II ibn Hussein (1759–1782) had the Tourbet el Bey constructed in the south of the Medina as a mausoleum for his family, It is the largest funerary monument in Tunis.

In the time of Muhammad III as-Sadiq (1859–1882) the walls of the Medina were in such bad repair that in some places they threatened to collapse. In 1865 he began demolishing them, along with a number of the Medina's historic gates: Bab Cartagena, Bab Souika, Bab Bnet and Bab El Jazira.

=== Domestic architecture ===
- Dar Lasram
- Dar Al Jaziri
- Dar Bach Hamba
- Dar Ben Ayed
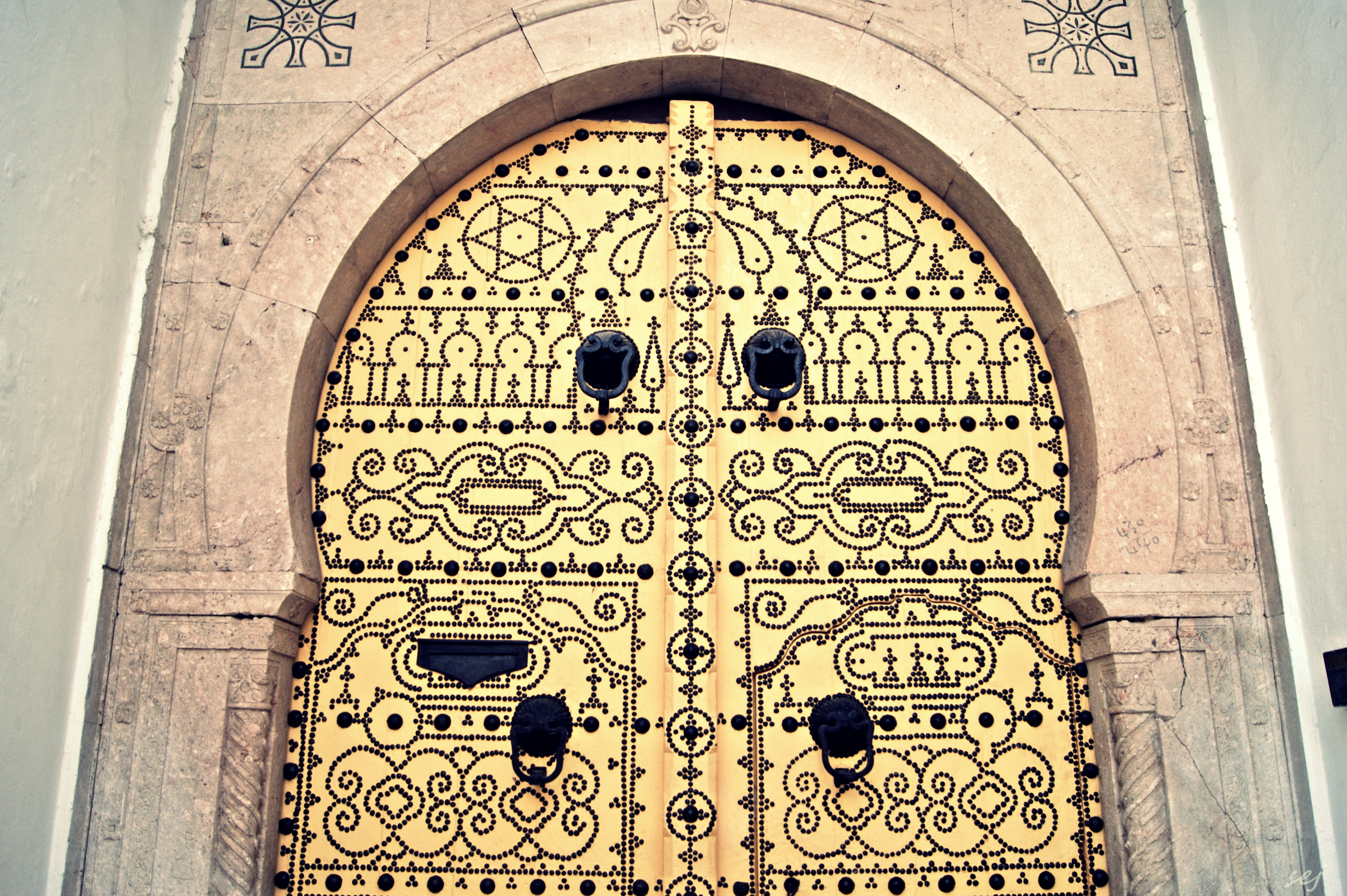
Close-up on a traditional door of the Medina

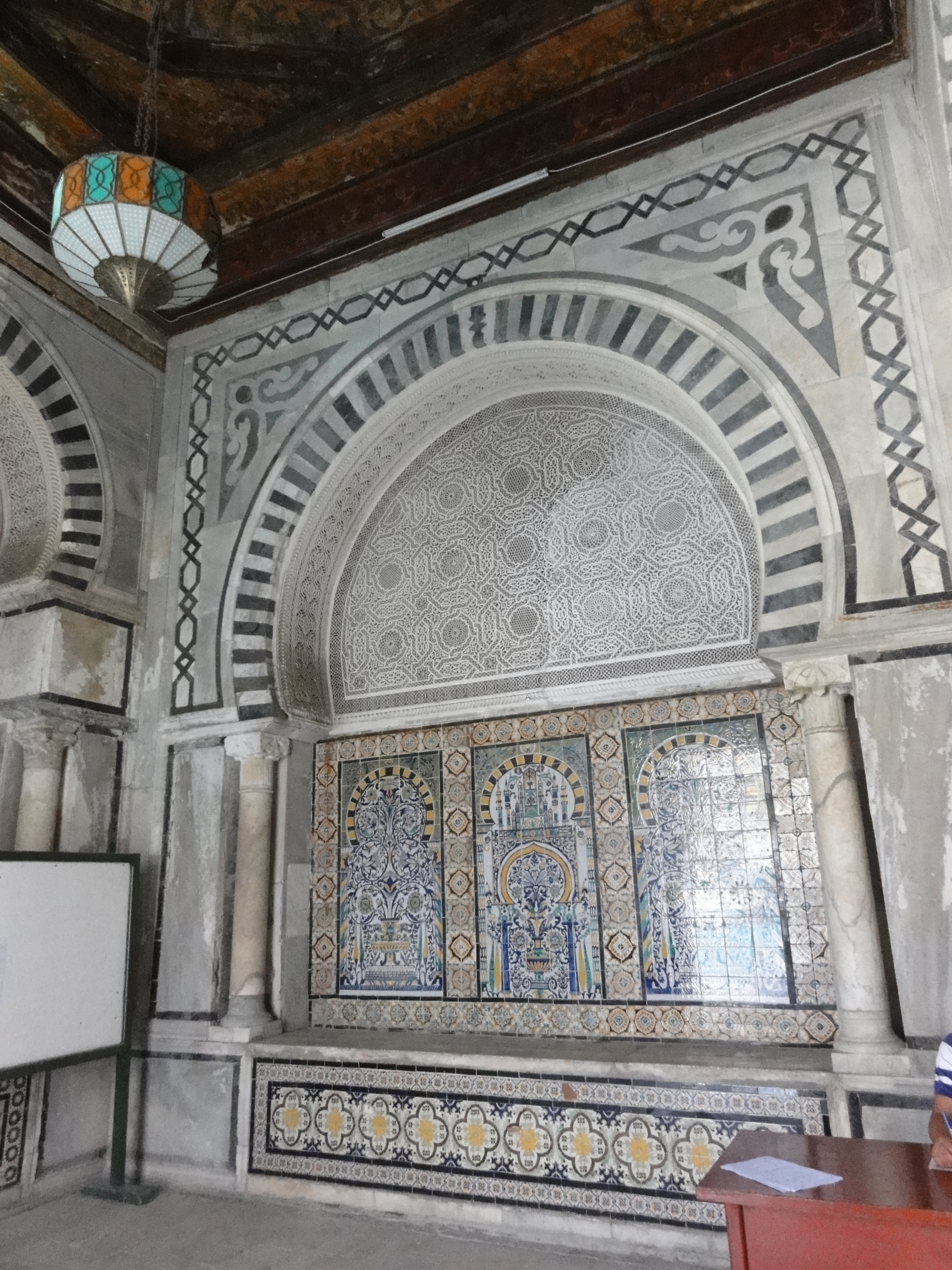
Vestibule of Dar Othman

== Landmarks ==
=== City gates ===
Out of the original four gates, two are still standing, namely the Bab el Bhar in the east and the Bab Sidi Kacem as part of the Kasbah Fortress in the south-west. The other two, located at the northern entrances, were named Bab Sidi Abdallah Cherif and Bab El Allouj.

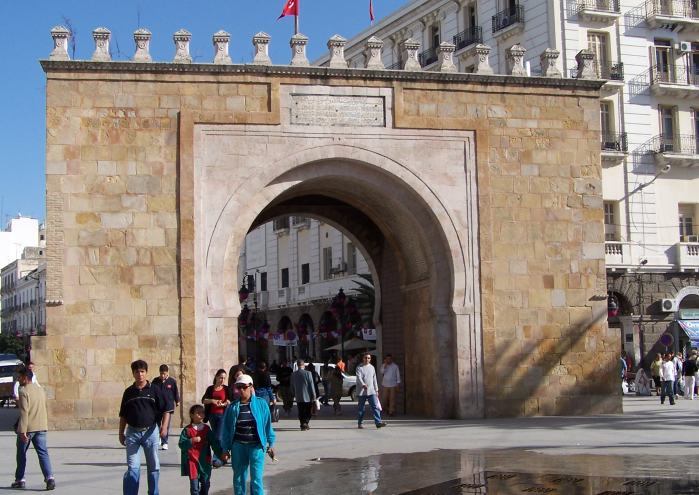
Bab el Bhar

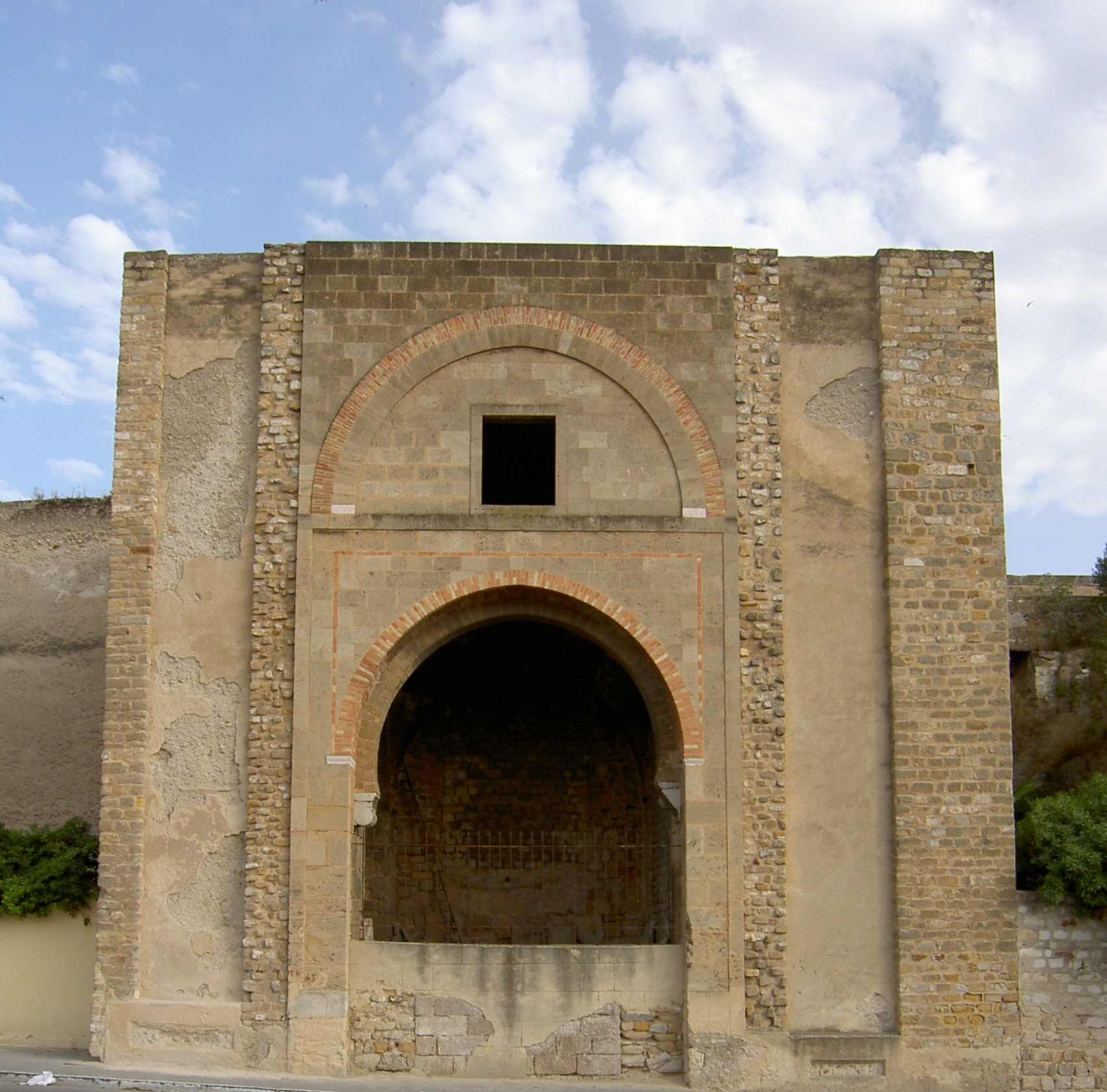
Bab Sidi Kacem

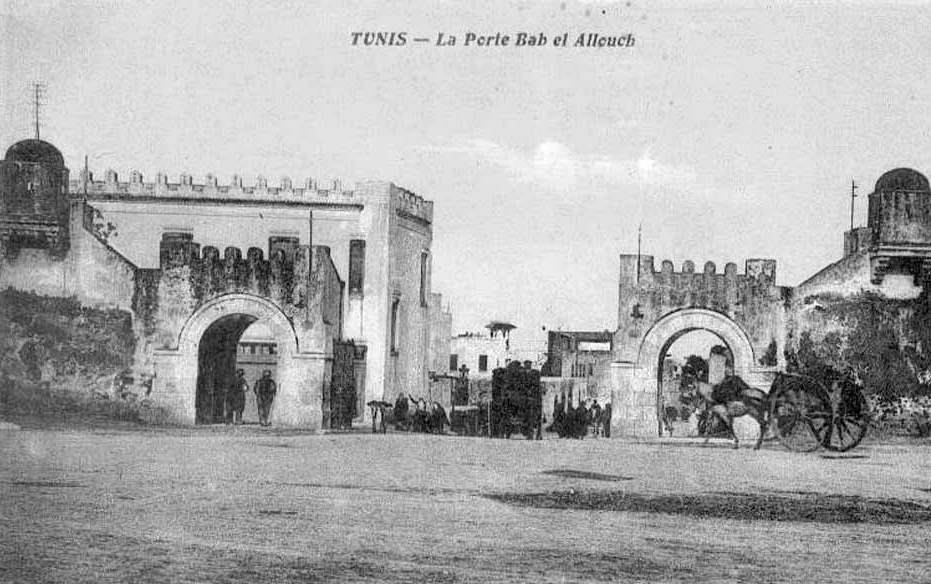
Bab El Allouj

=== Madrasas ===
Since the Hafsid era, madrasas had emerged in the medina of Tunis which appeared in Arab Orient style. It was established to serve Almohads by raising workers for public services. The Hafsid sultans took care of the establishment of madrasas, and the princesses participated in this effort as well as the initiatives of the scholars and the imams in this field, and several madrasas emerged as a link to the patrons. The establishment of schools continued after the annexation of Tunisia by the Ottoman Empire, but the purpose of these madrasas had changed over time. Since 17th century when the Ottomans arrived, they employed these madrasas to spread their Hanafi maddhab. However in the 20th century, the role of these madrasas are mostly confined to accommodation of the students studying in Ez-Zitouna University.

=== Mosques ===
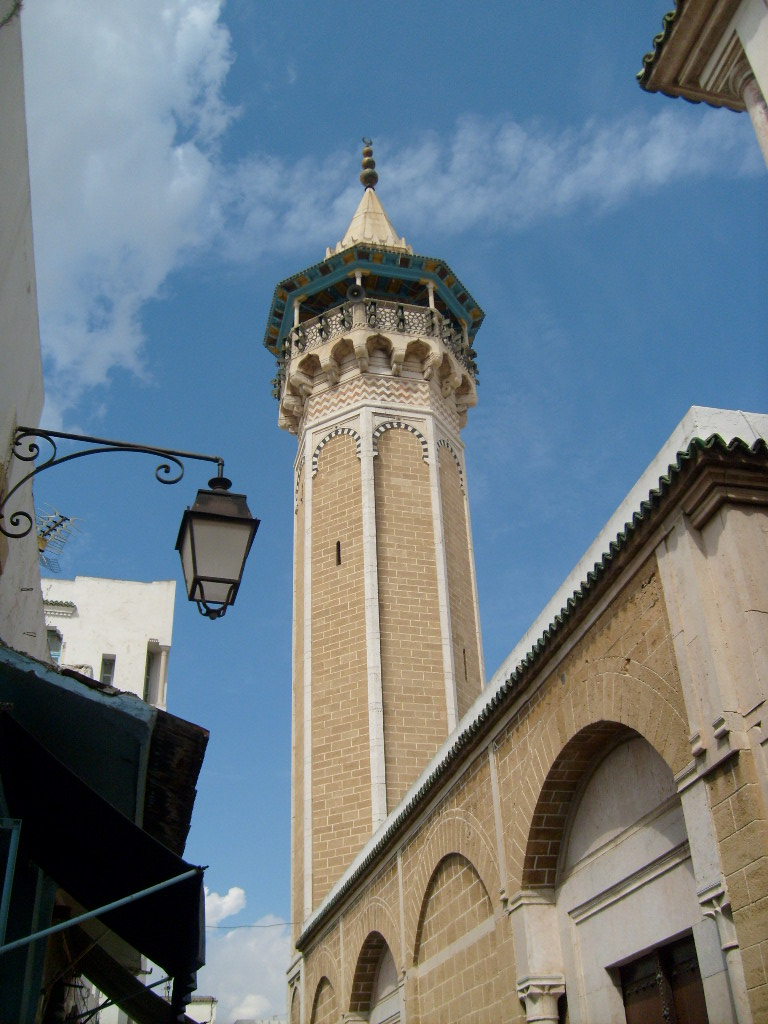
Minaret of mosque Hammouda-Pacha

The Medina contains most of the great mosques of the capital, which were all built before the French protectorate.

The main Zitouna Mosque was built in 732 in the heart of the Medina and then rebuilt in 864. It was also for a long time an important place of culture and knowledge, acting as home to the Zitouna University until the independence of Tunisia. It still hosts ceremonies marking the main dates of the Muslim calendar that are regularly attended by the President of the Republic.

The Kasbah Mosque built between 1231 and 1235, was the second mosque to be built in the Medina, intended for the rulers themselves, who lived in the nearby Kasbah. It is distinguished especially by the dome in stalactites preceding the mihrab and by its minaret that recalls that of the Koutoubia of Marrakech and is the highest in the Medina.

The Ksar Mosque of the Hanafi rite, located opposite the Dar Hussein (Bab Menara), was built in the 12th century under the Khurasanid dynasty.

The Youssef Dey Mosque functioned first as an oratory before becoming a mosque in 1631, and is the first mosque of the Ottoman-Turkish period. The Hammouda-Pacha mosque, built in 1655, was the second mosque of the Hanefite rite built in Tunis while the Sidi Mahrez mosque is the largest mosque of this type in the country. Built from 1692 to 1697, it is Ottoman-inspired and recalls some Istanbul mosques such as the Blue Mosque (erected between 1609 and 1616) and the Yeni Valide (completed in 1663). The El Jedid Mosque, built by the founder of the Hussein dynasty Hussein the Ist Bey between 1723 and 1727, has, like the Youssef Dey and Hammouda-Pacha mosques, an Ottoman-inspired octagonal minaret.

The Saheb Ettabaâ Mosque, built between 1808 and 1814, is the last mosque constructed in Tunis by the Husseinites before the French occupation.

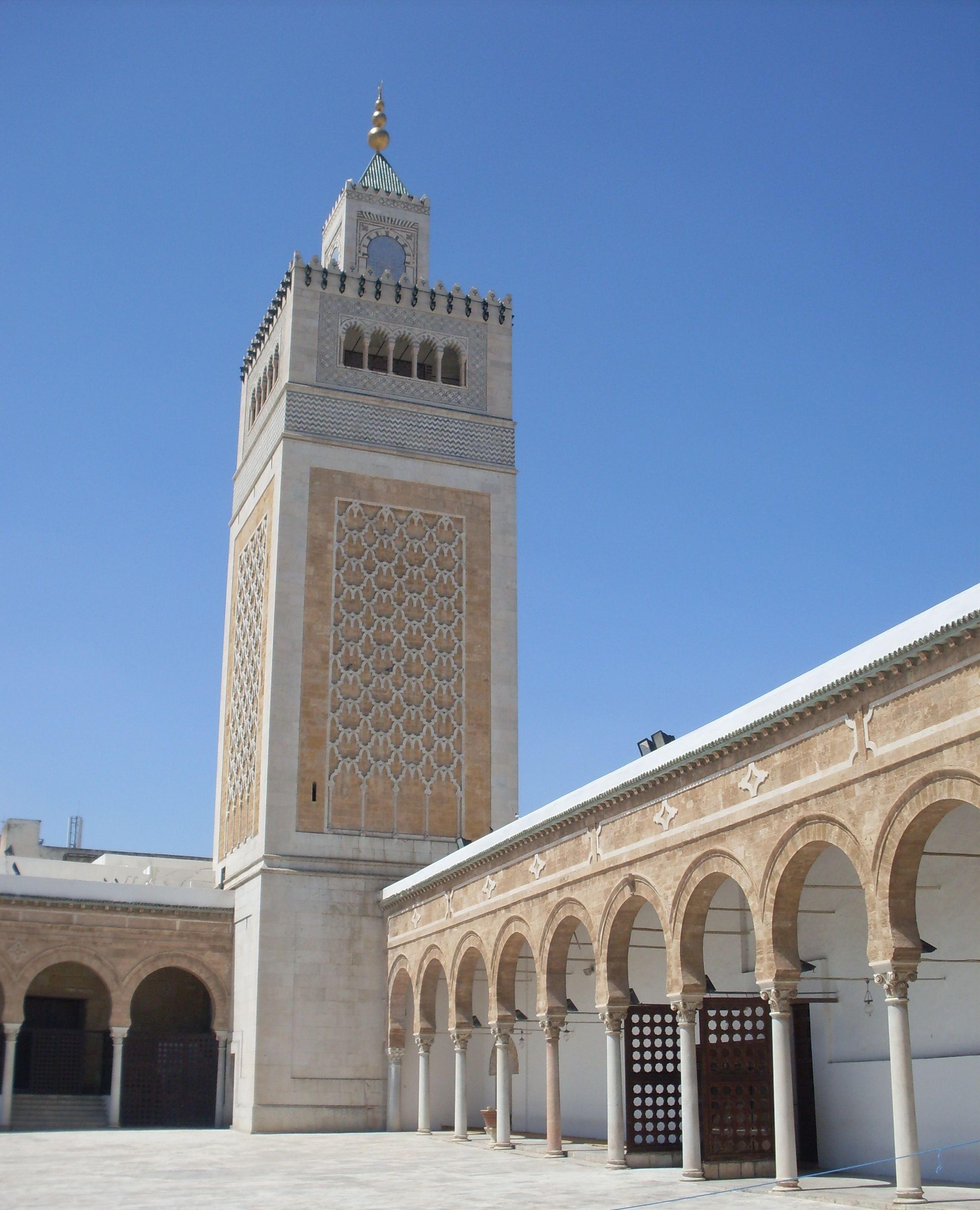
Al-Zaytuna Mosque

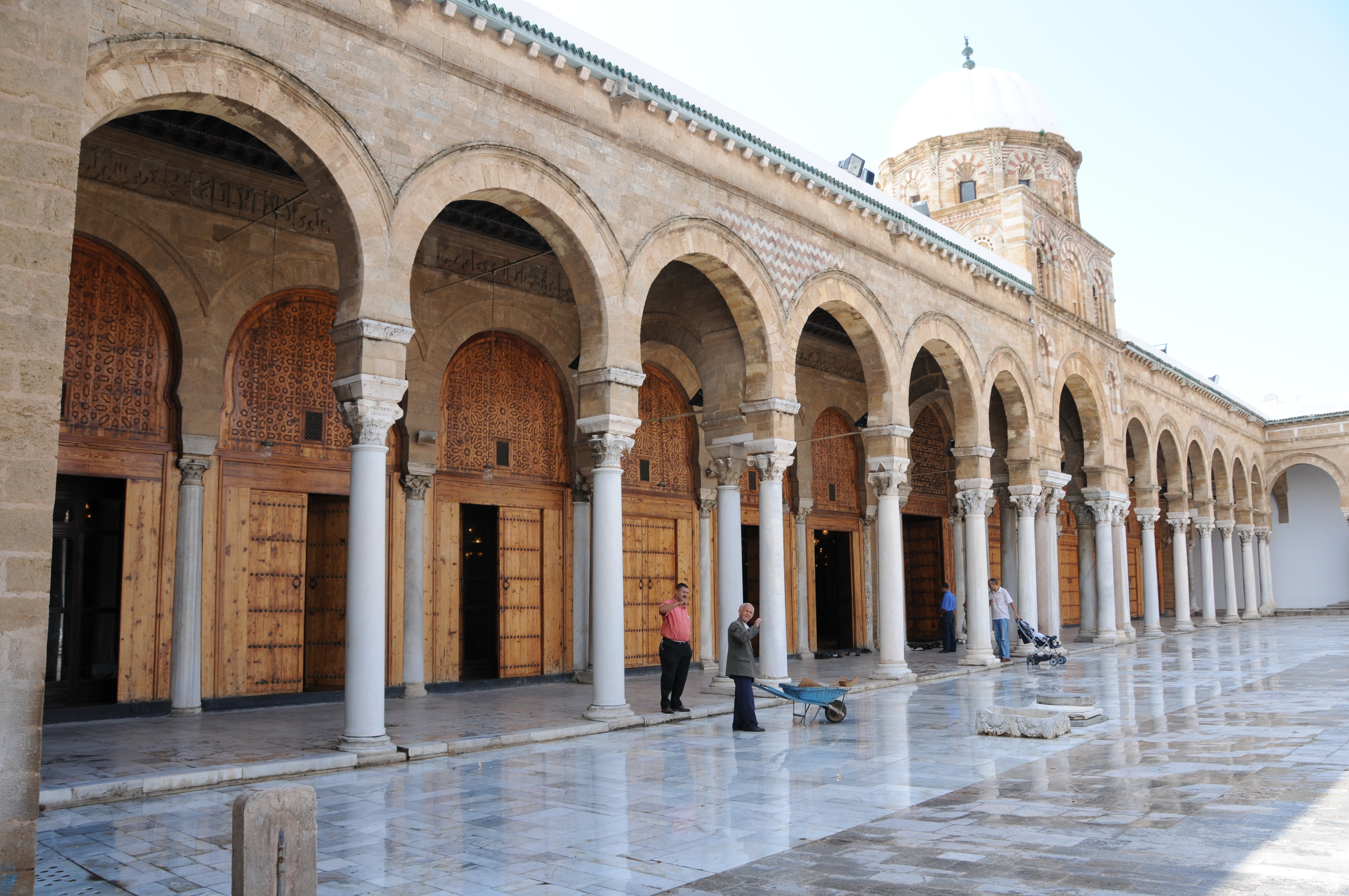
Zitouna Mosque Court

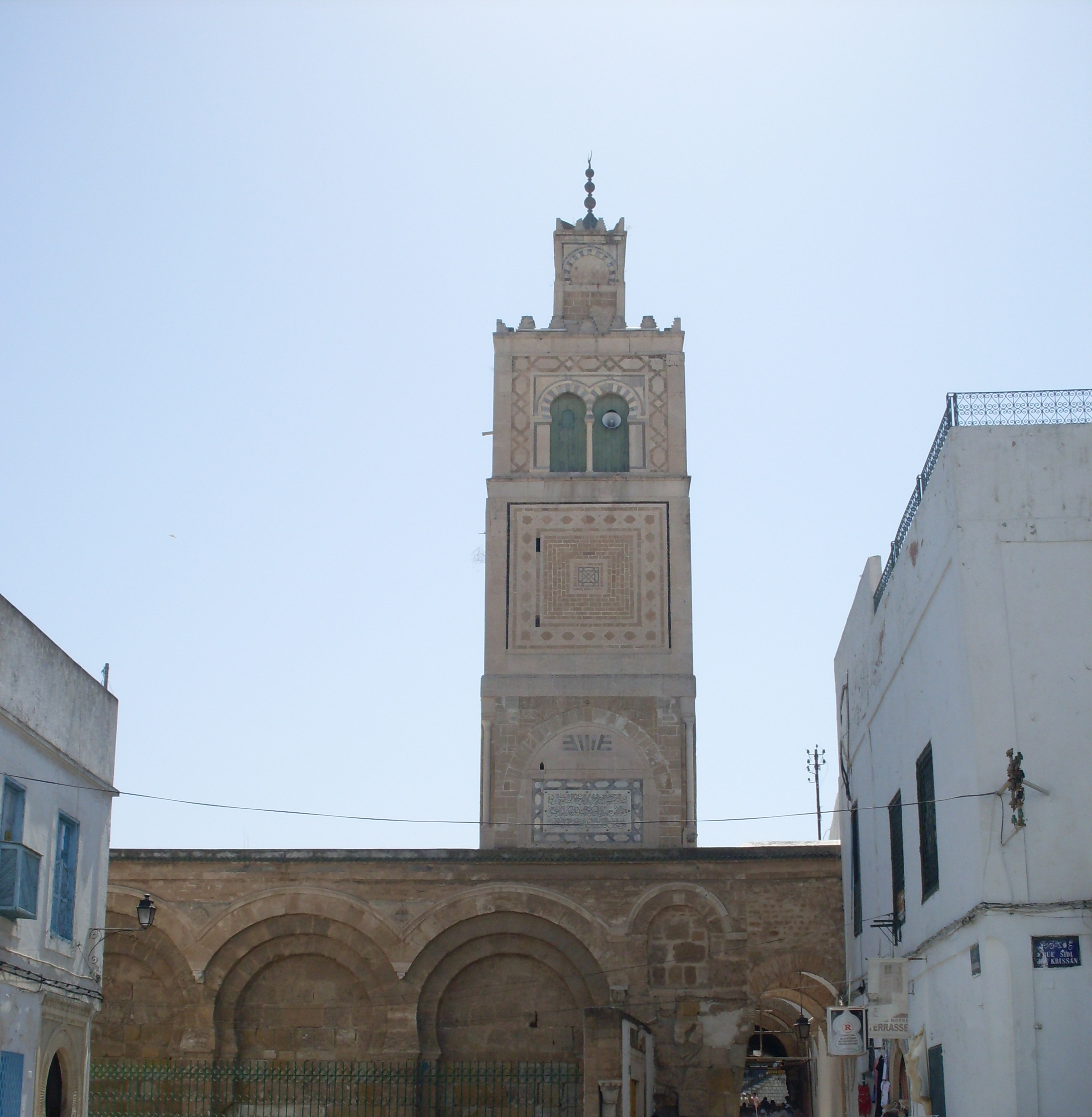
El Ksar Mosque dating from 12th century (with the exception of its minaret built 17th century)

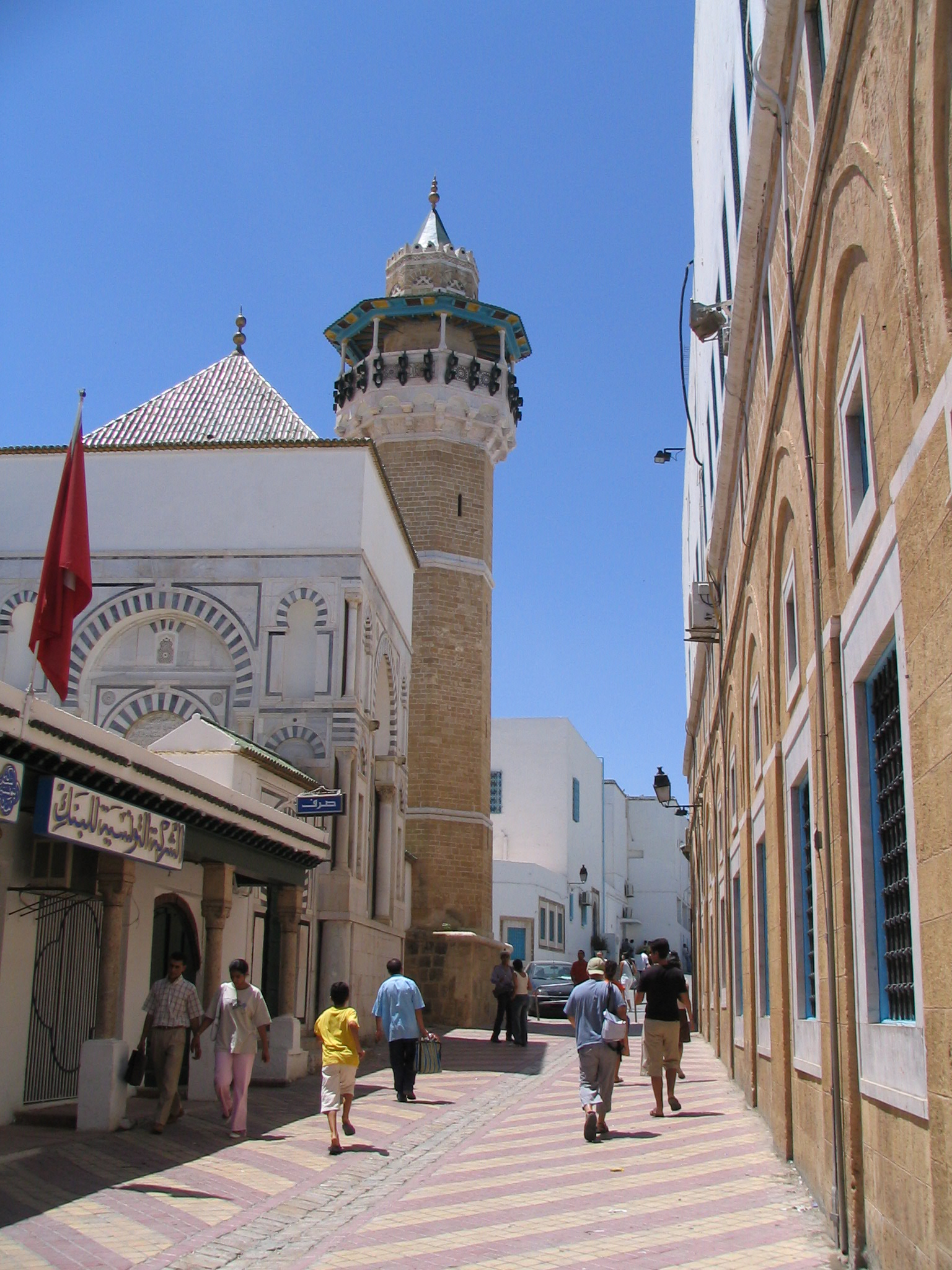
Youssef Dey Mosque (First half of the 17th century)

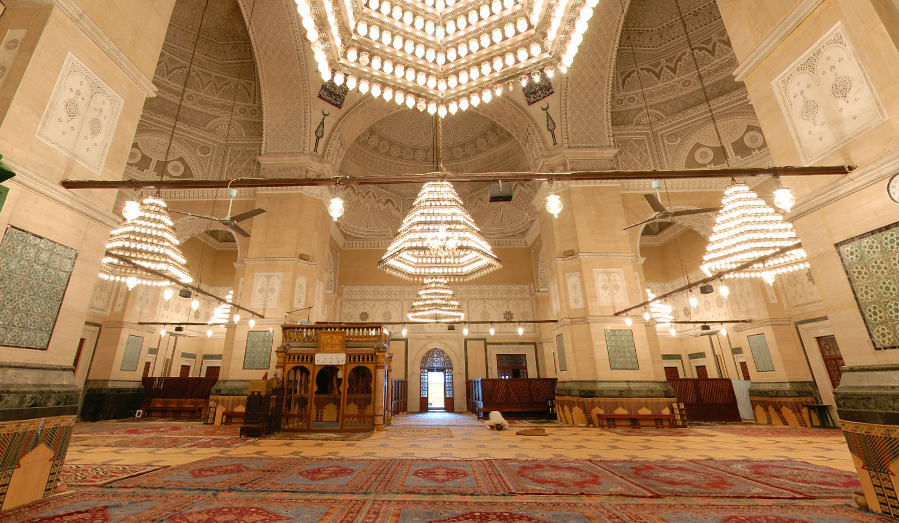
Prayer room of the mosque Sidi Mahrez (End of the 17th century)

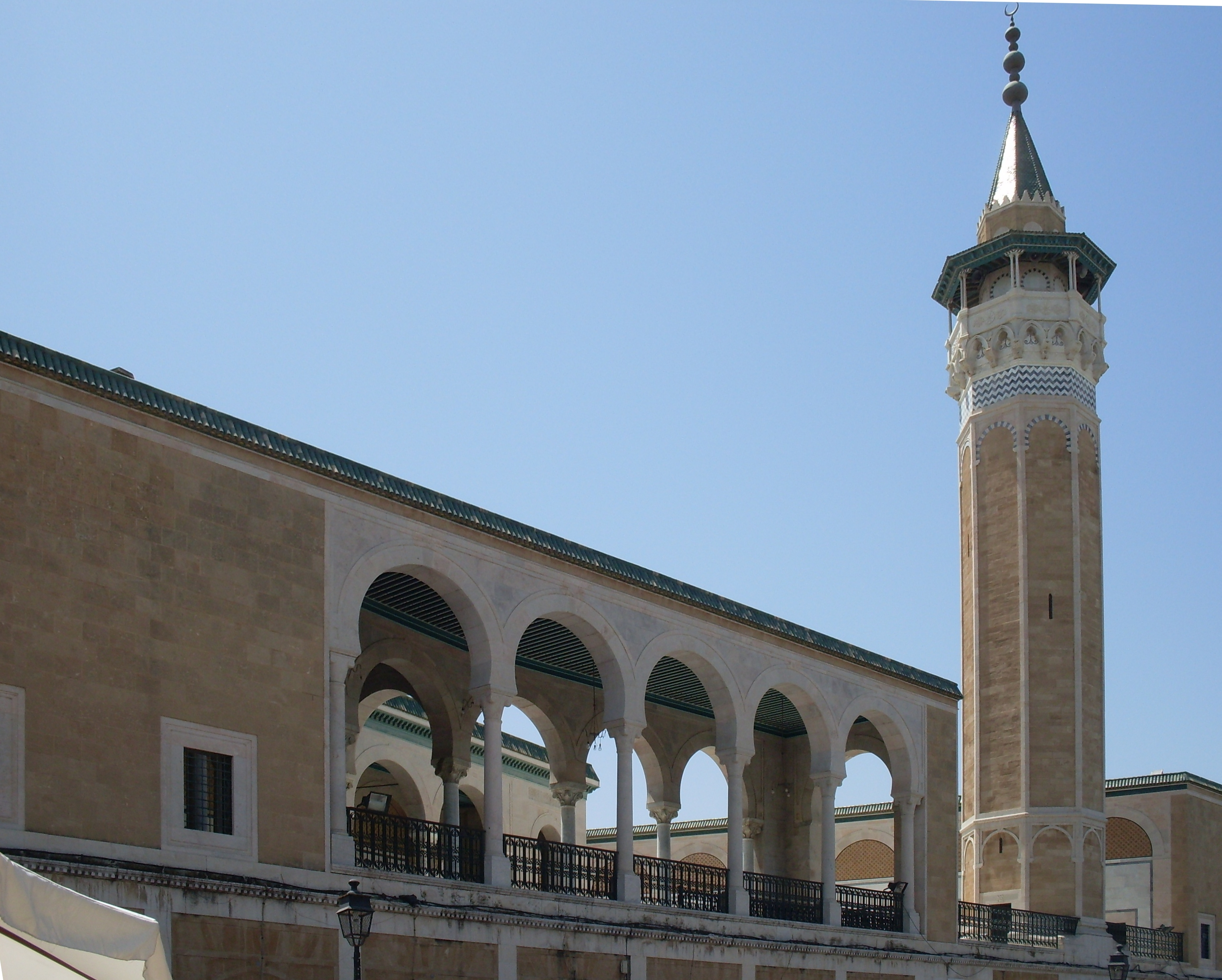
View of the mosque Saheb Ettabaâ (beginning of 19th century)

=== Palaces ===
The palaces or the Dars are one of the most important historical monuments in the ancient city of Tunis, which were inhabited by politicians, wealthy class and dignitaries of the city.

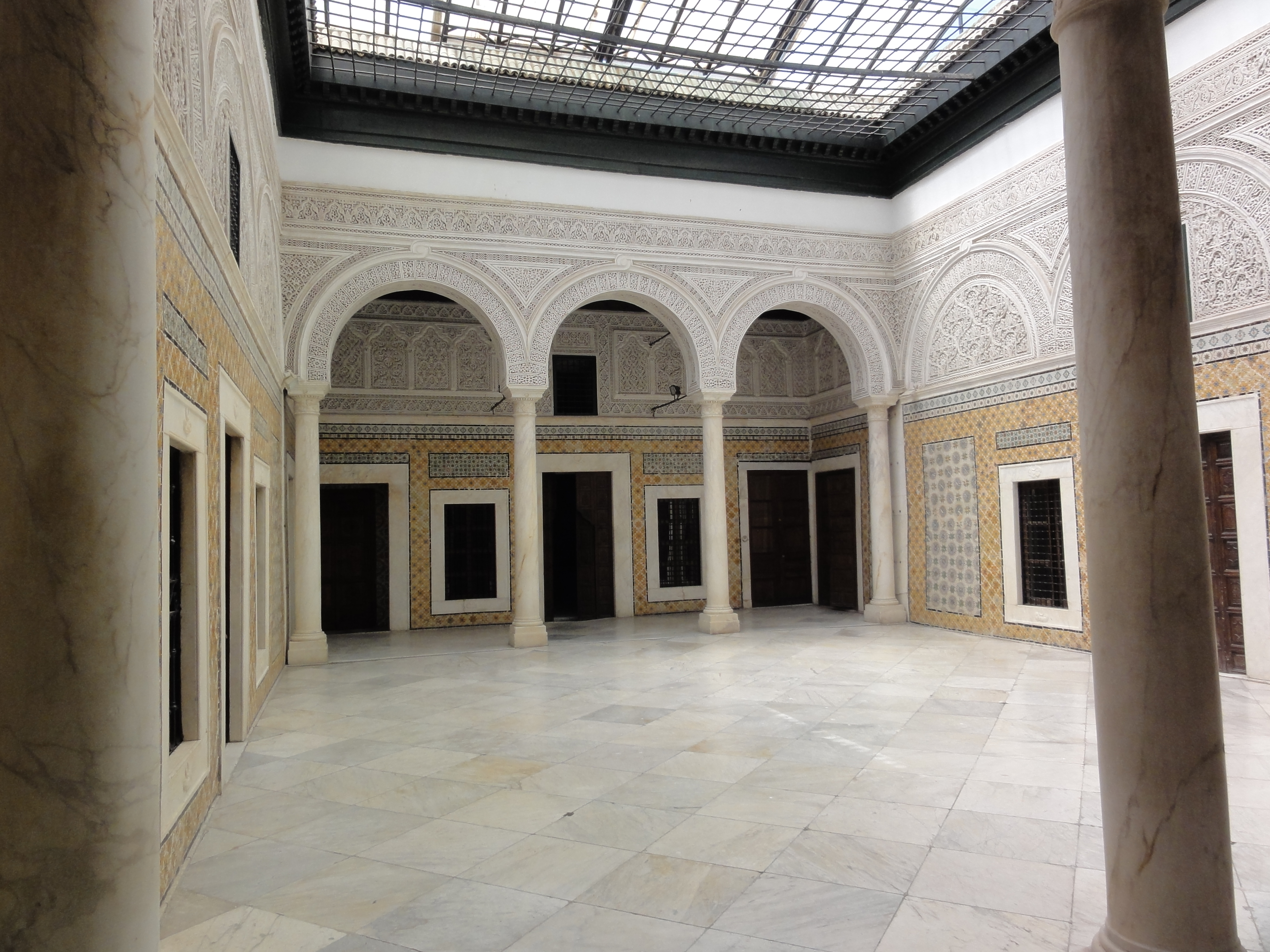
Dar Lasram

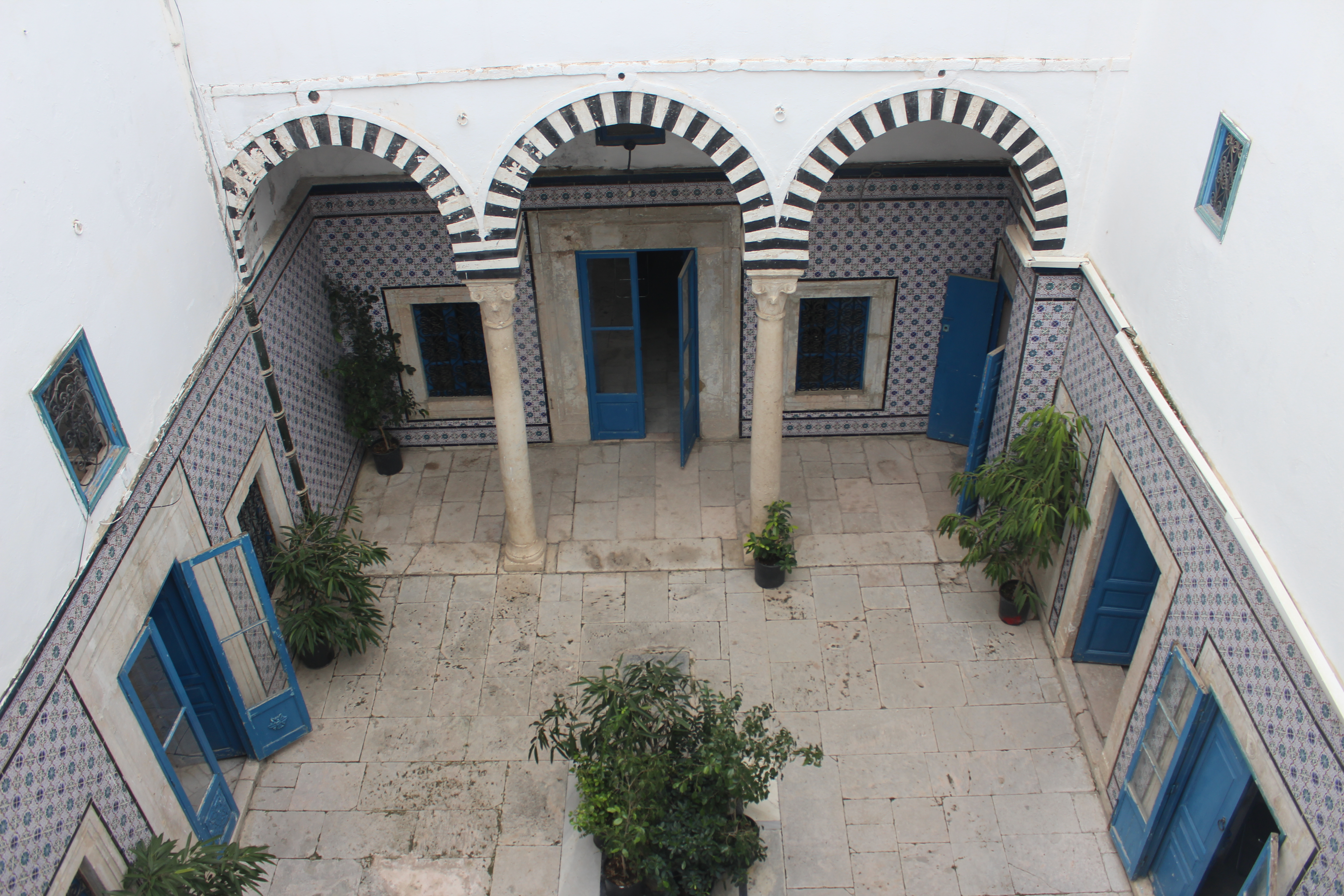
Dar Ben Achour

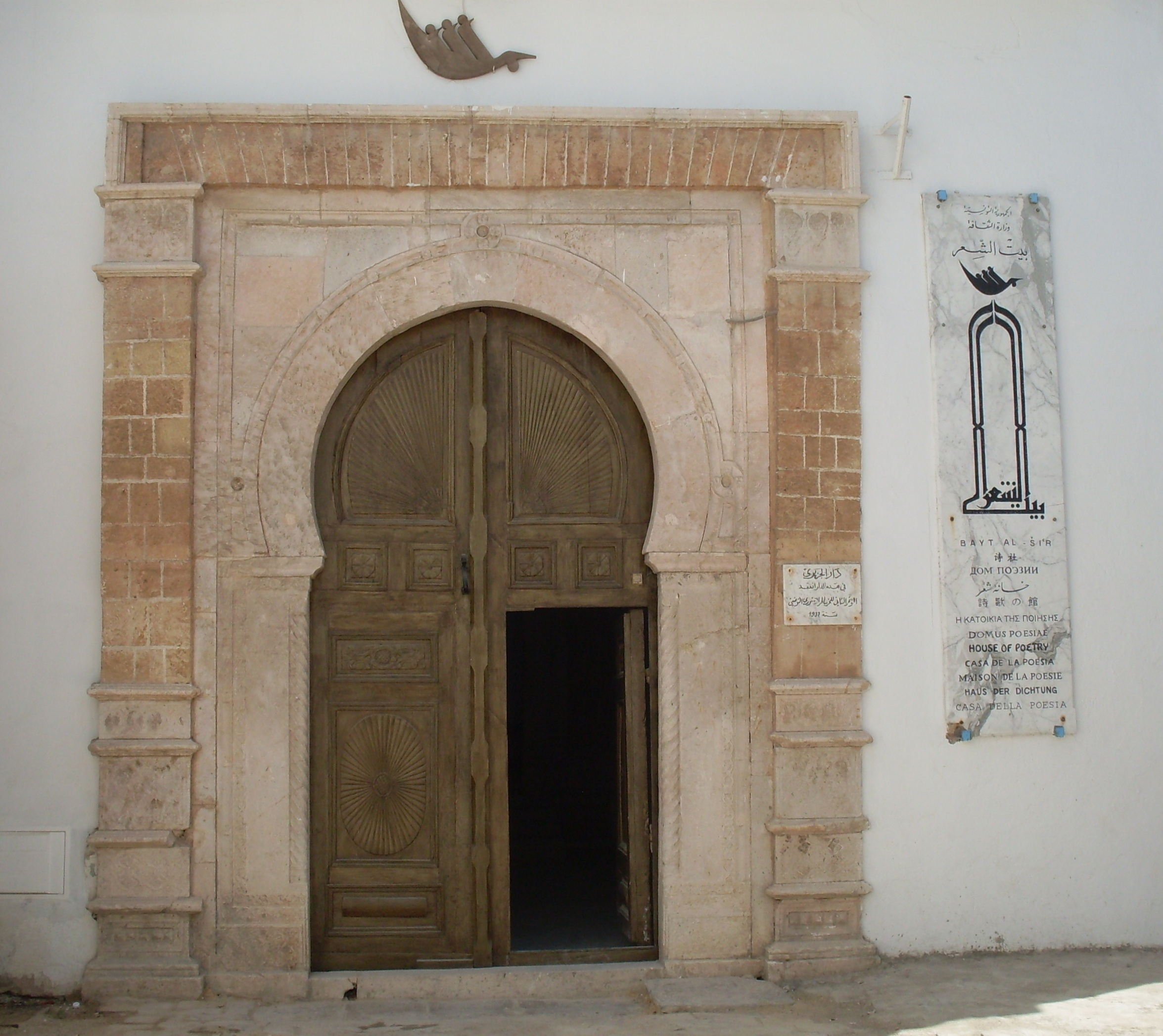
Dar Al Jaziri

== Climate change ==
As a coastal heritage site, Medina of Tunis is vulnerable to sea level rise. In 2022, the IPCC Sixth Assessment Report included it in the list of African cultural sites which would be threatened by flooding and coastal erosion by the end of the century, but only if climate change followed RCP 8.5, which is the scenario of high and continually increasing greenhouse gas emissions associated with the warming of over 4 °C., and is no longer considered very likely. The other, more plausible scenarios result in lower warming levels and consequently lower sea level rise: yet, sea levels would continue to increase for about 10,000 years under all of them. Even if the warming is limited to 1.5 °C, global sea level rise is still expected to exceed 2–3 m (7–10 ft) after 2000 years (and higher warming levels will see larger increases by then), consequently exceeding 2100 levels of sea level rise under RCP 8.5 (~0.75 m (2 ft) with a range of 0.5–1 m (2–3 ft)) well before the year 4000. This means that unless effective adaptation efforts such as sea walls can be constructed to deal with the sea level rise, damage and the potential destruction of Medina of Tunis is a matter of time.

== See also ==
- Religion in Tunisia
- Sainte-Croix Church of Tunis, a former church building
- Sidi Abdallah Cherif Mausoleum
- Moorish architecture
- Hara, the former Jewish quarter of the Medina of Tunis
