= Dar Hammuda Pasha =

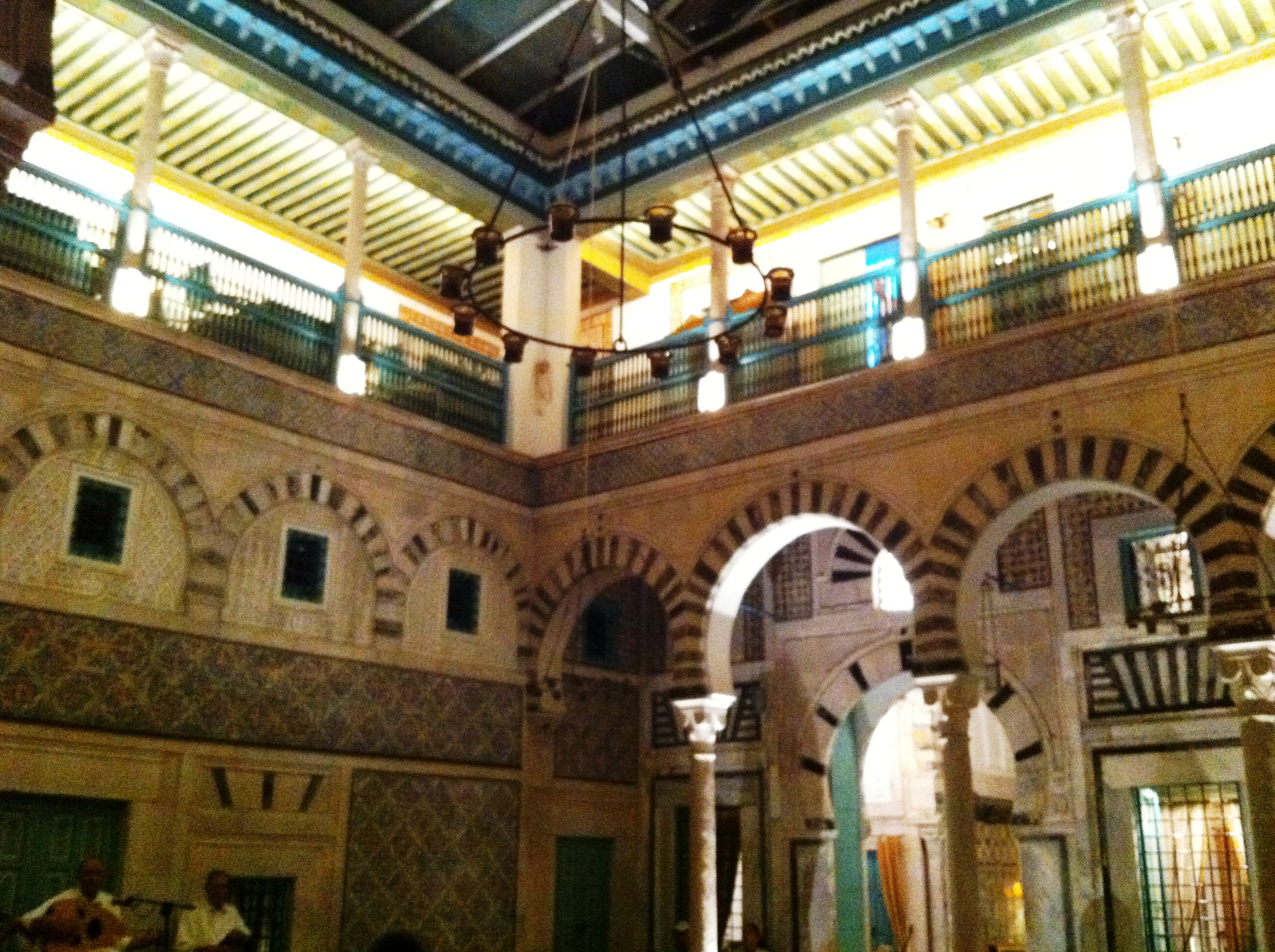
- Courtyard of Dar Hammuda Pasha at night
- Interactive map of the Dar Hammuda Pasha area

General information
- Type: Palace
- Architectural style: Ottoman architecture Tunisian architecture Moorish architecture
- Location: Medina of Tunis, Tunis, Tunisia
- Year built: 1630
- Client: Hammuda Pasha Bey

Dar Hammuda Pasha is an old palace in the medina of Tunis. It is considered one of the oldest and biggest palaces of the medina that kept their original architecture.

== Localization ==
It is located in Tunis, in the prestigious Sidi Ben Arous Street, near the political power centre.

== History ==
Dar Hammuda Pasha was built by Hammuda Pasha Bey, a Muradid prince in 1630.

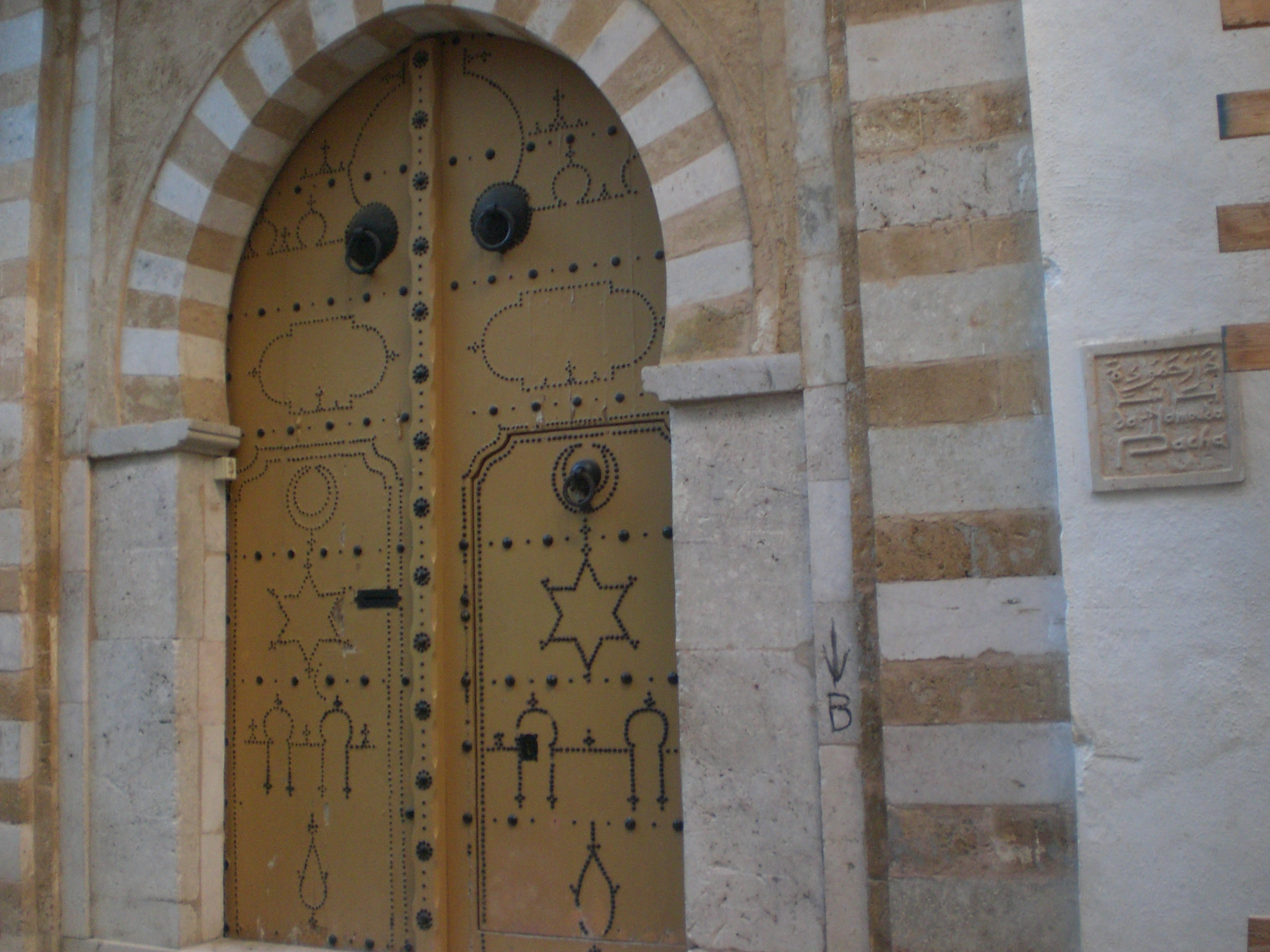
Door of Dar Hammuda Pasha

The palace was the residence place of Hammuda Pasha and his first wife, the well known princess Aziza Othmana, before succeeding his father to the throne and moving to Dar El Bey (then called Dar El Kbira or Big House). Few years before his death, Hammuda Pacha decides to give Dar El Bey to his eldest son and successor, Murad II while Dar Hammouda Pacha (called Dar El Sghira at that time or Small House) was given to his younger son Mohamed El Hafsi Pasha.

Under the Husainid dynasty, the palace was used as an annex to Dar El Bey and a residence place for the royal family.

After the Mejba Revolt, the palace was offered by Muhammad III as-Sadiq to Salah Ben Mohamed, a kahia and tribal leader who was promoted later to bach hamba (captain of the mounted police) and a lieutenant governor of El Kef for his loyalty and good services during the civil war. Salah Ben Mohamed transformed the palace into a habous.

In 1872, Hammuda Chahed, a rich noble and one of the biggest chaouachia corporation chiefs, bought it but kept its previous legal status as a habous.

In 1957, Dar Hammouda Pacha lost its status as a habous due to a new law, which made it possible to the touristic development society of Tunisia, and affiliate of the Poulina group to buy the palace and convert it into a prestigious restaurant called Dar Hammouda Pacha.

== Architecture ==
Laurent d'Arvieux, who visited the palace in 1670, gave detailed description of the palace :

The house of Mehmet Bey his brother is in the same street, almost face to face to Murad's one. It has a particular disposition: the women's section has, as I have been told, a Tunisian traditional design, while the master's one has an Italian look, there are frilled courts, many rooms, salons, dressing rooms, galleries, gardens and anything else anyone can wish for in a house of a great master

— Laurent d'Arvieux, Palais et résidences des Mouradites : apport des documents des archives locales (la Tunisie au XVIIe siècle)
