= The Sunna and Reform =

2008 book by Abdallah Laroui

- Author: Abdallah Laroui
- Original title: السنة والإصلاح
- Language: Arabic
- Publisher: Arab Cultural Center
- Publication date: 2008
- Publication place: Casablanca, Morocco
- Pages: 224

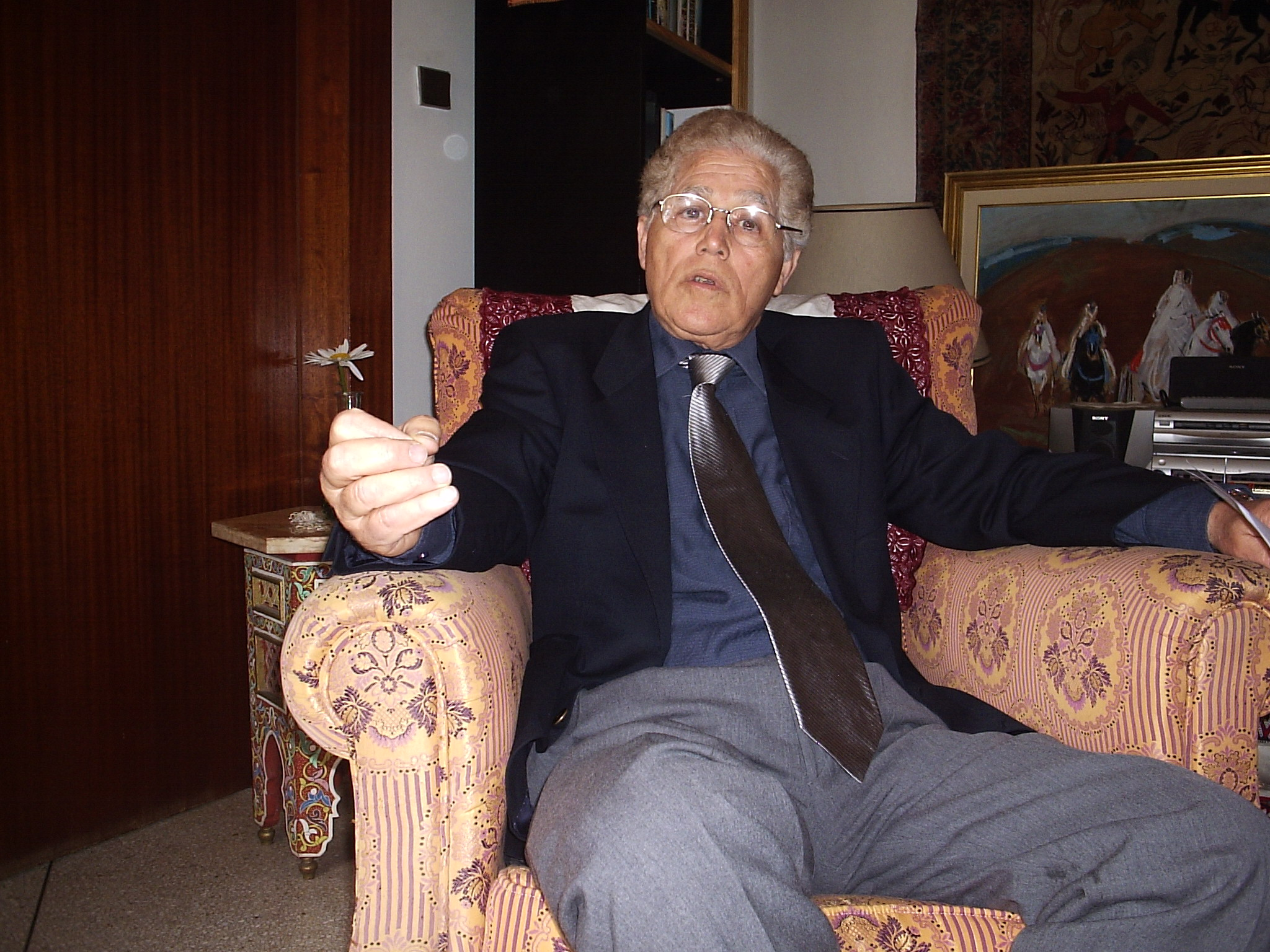
Abdallah Laroui, author of The Sunna and Reform

The Sunna and Reform (Arabic: السنة والإصلاح, romanized: As-Sunna wal-Iṣlāḥ) is a book by the Moroccan thinker and historian Abdallah Laroui. Laroui is the recipient of several renowned international and Arab awards, including the Catalonia International Prize in Spain in 2000, and the Moroccan Book Award in 1990 and 1997. He was also awarded the Sheikh Zayed Book Award for "Cultural Personality of the Year" in its eleventh session (2016–2017) in recognition of his influential works and his synthesis of Arab and Western culture.

The book was first published in 2008 by the Arab Cultural Center in Casablanca, Morocco.

The book is structured as a response to questions from a foreign Muslim woman. These questions address the image of Islam, how it presents itself, and how it views other religions, particularly as the woman lives in a multi-religious environment. Laroui dedicates a full chapter to this matter.

== Synopsis ==
This work is considered a profound intellectual attempt to re-examine the relationship between Islamic heritage, represented by the Prophetic Sunna, and the concept of reform in both religious and social contexts.

The book is a reflection on Islamic modernity, which, according to Laroui, cannot be established without deconstructing the mechanisms and concepts of the reasoning used in creating the Sunan and the religious, philosophical, and theological (Kalam) systems. This is done to contemplate their shared scientific and philosophical origins, which he refers to as Hellenistic.

The book discusses the proper way to understand and read the Quran, in the author's view, and the relationship a Muslim should establish with their religious heritage. Laroui stated that "the main purpose of the book is to call for a thoughtful reading of religion befitting its stature. This means that the author, through the book's questions and answers, has systematically explored what has been woven around the Quranic text from the science of hadith and the Sunna, as well as the sciences built upon it, such as Kalam and philosophy. He did not overlook the connection that links the Quran to the scriptures that preceded it."

== Methodology ==
Abdallah Laroui primarily focuses on the issue of methodology when addressing the problems of Arab thought. "His approach is epistemological... particularly given his deep interest in Arab issues, especially Arab thought and heritage. The methodology Laroui employs is based on two aspects: the historicist and the foundational."

The author states at the beginning of his book:

I do not see myself as a philosopher—and who today can claim to be a philosopher? Nor do I see myself as a Mutakallim (theologian) or even a historian whose sole concern is to recall an event as it happened in a specific time and place. I have never raised the banner of philosophy, religion, or history, but rather the banner of Historicism at a time when no one accepts being associated with this school of thought due to how much it has been refuted and ridiculed.

The historicism Laroui discusses is not a speculative philosophical doctrine but an ethical stance that views history as a laboratory for ethics and, consequently, for politics. "The historicist is not as concerned with truth as with behavior, with the individual's stance among heroes. In his view, history is, first and foremost, practical knowledge."

In other words, historicism means: "discovering the societal reality that can only be truly understood from a historical perspective, for what moves society is not truth as much as it is utility."

== Book Content ==
The book is divided into several chapters that address multiple themes, most notably:

- Chapter One: The Questioner and the Respondent
- Chapter Two: Philosophers and Theologians
- Chapter Three: The Principles
- Chapter Four: Repentance and the Call
- Chapter Five: Supplication and the Covenant
- Chapter Six: Reading and Qur'an
- Chapter Seven: Sunna and Tradition
- Chapter Eight: Reform
- Conclusion: Striving and Taste

== Quotations from the Book ==
No genuine reform can be achieved without understanding the historical context of religious texts.

The Sunna is not a static collection of sayings and actions, but a social and religious phenomenon that has evolved through the ages.

The relationship between religion and modernity should not be one of conflict, but of critical and historical dialogue.

Reform requires intellectual courage to review prevailing concepts and deconstruct established assumptions.

The Quran, as a Mushaf to be browsed—a collection of letters, words, and phrases—is a material document like any other. There is no objection to subjecting it to all forms of contemporary criticism.

== Criticism ==
The book has received significant criticism. In their book رؤية نقدية لكتاب السنة والاصلاح,للدكتور عبد الله العروي (A Critical View of 'The Sunna and Reform' by Dr. Abdallah Laroui), authors Abd al-Salam Muhammad al-Bakkari and al-Siddiq Muhammad Boualam argue that Laroui's work "requires a deep critique of the falsehoods and suspicions it contains." They claim that through it, he "attempted to present the Prophetic Sunna in a form contrary to its true image, with the intent of casting doubt upon it and diminishing its status in minds and hearts." The authors stated that their critique aimed to weigh Laroui's statements "by the measure of both reason and revelation," by referring to the two primary sources of Islam—the Quran and the Sunna—as well as to Islamic history and Islamic civilization. They sought to "refute what he claimed" by presenting evidence on topics Laroui's book covers, such as the Sunna, its scholars, and how scholars have handled, understood, presented, collected, compiled, and studied it."
