= Melmli Mosque =

Mosque in Tunis, Tunisia

- جامع الململي
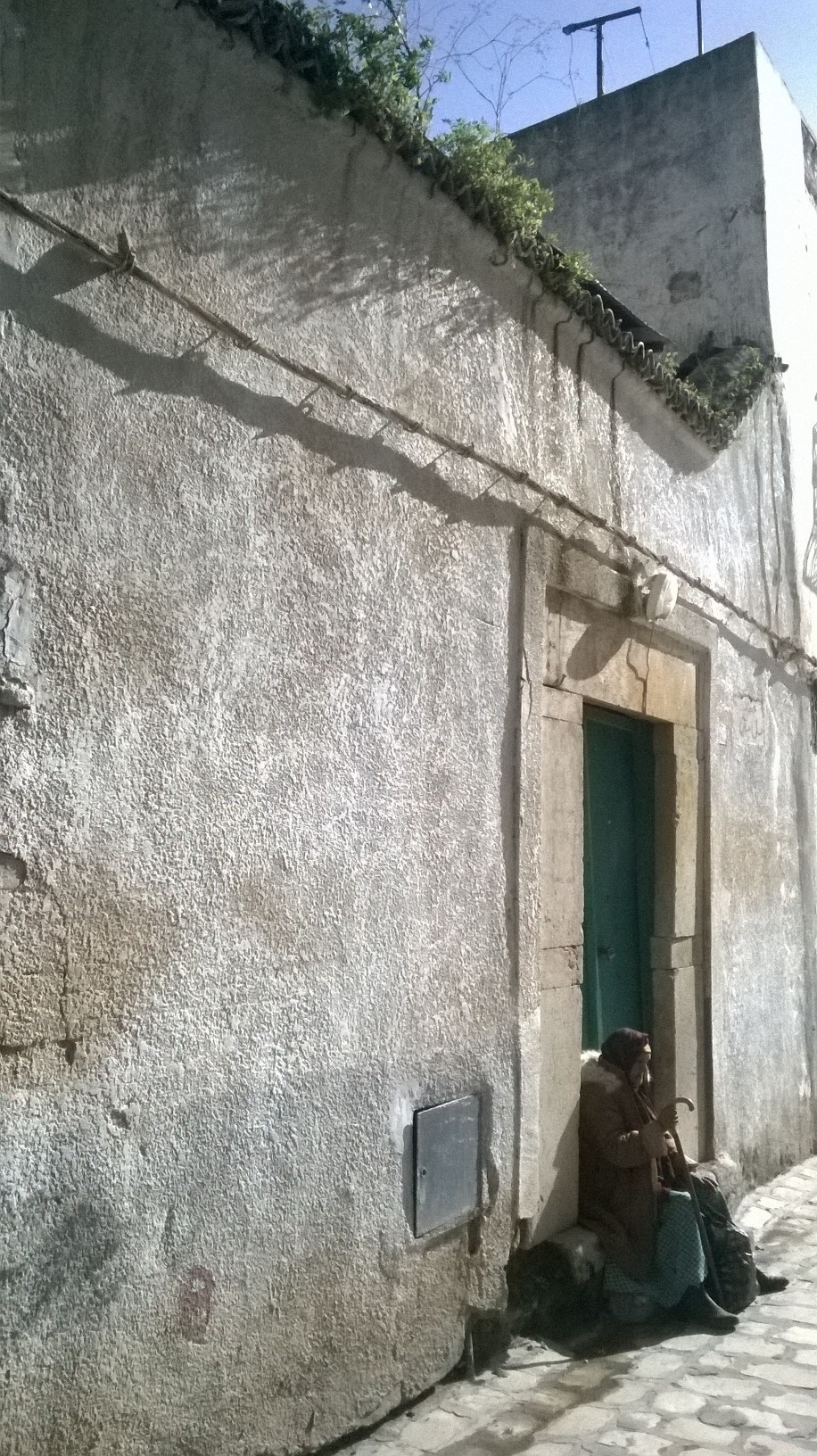

- Location within Tunisia

Religion
- Affiliation: Sunni Islam

Location
- Location: Tunis, Tunisia
- Interactive map of Melmli Mosque
- Coordinates: 36.803230°N 10.166557°E

Architecture
- Type: Mosque

Melmli Mosque (Arabic: جامع الململي), is a Tunisian mosque located in the north of the medina of Tunis.

== Localization ==
The mosque is located in 93 the Pacha Street.

== Etymology ==
The mosque got its name from its founder, bach hamba Slimane Melmli (Arabic: سليمان ململي), a statesman and a correspondent of Hammuda Pasha in Europe. He died in 1823.

== History ==
It was built during the Husainid era.

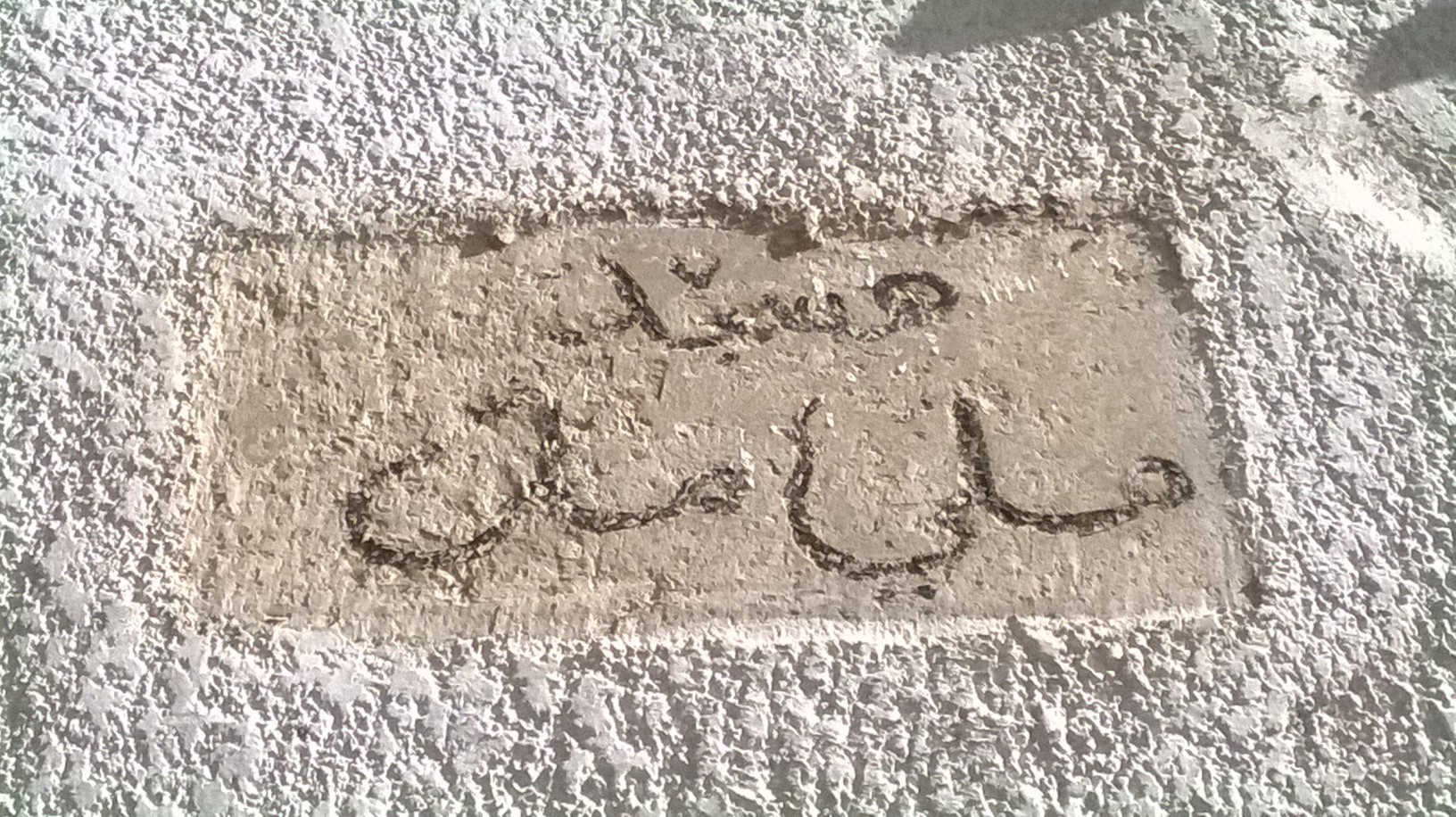
Inscription with the name of the mosque

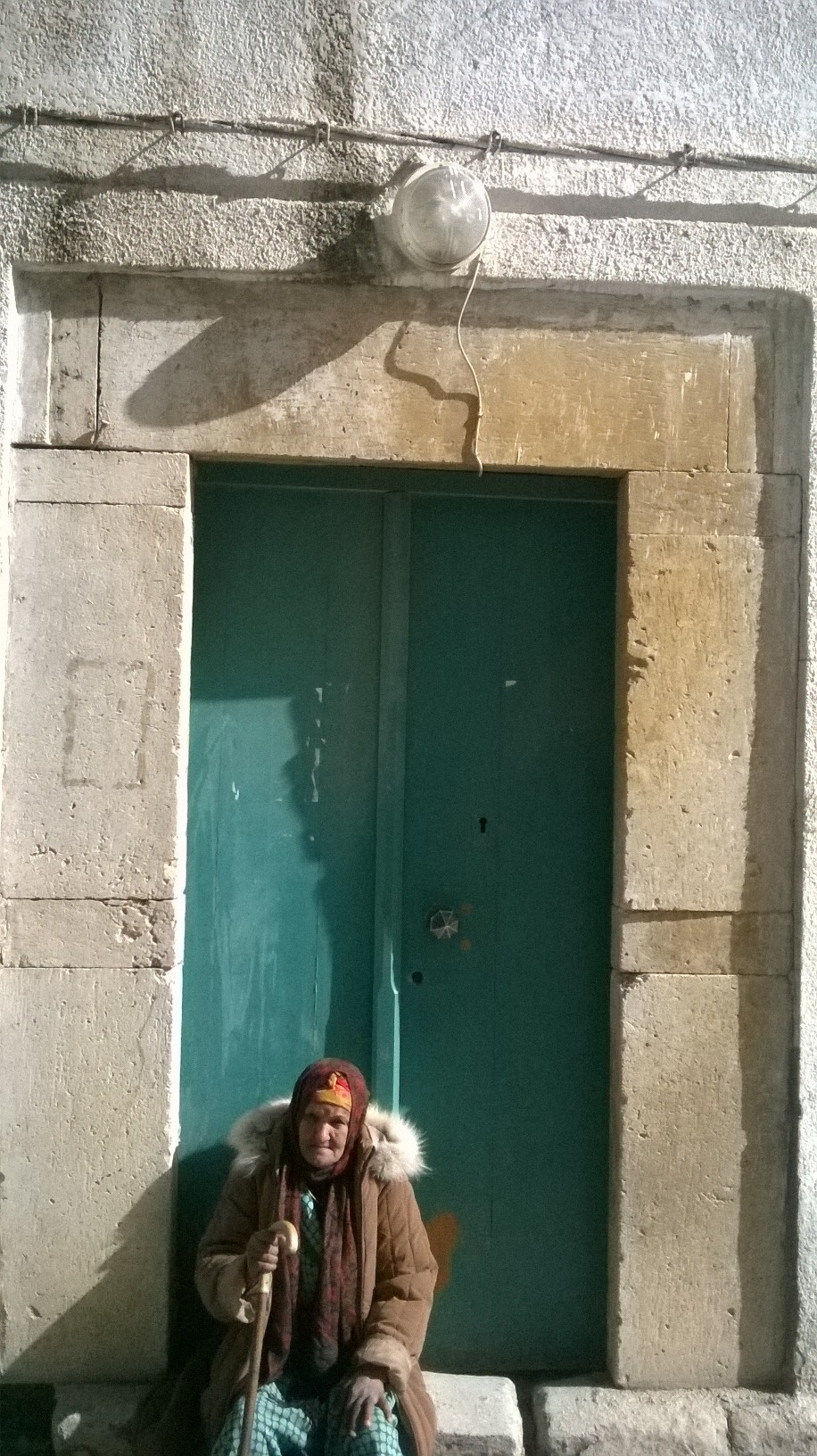
Entrance of the Mosque

== Bibliography ==
- Mohamed Belkhodja (1939). Tārīkh maʻālim al-tawḥīd fī al-qadīm wa-fī al-Jadīd (in Arabic). Tunis: al-Maṭbaʻah al-Tūnisīyah.
