= Abdelwahab Benmansour =

- عبد الوهاب بن منصور
- Born: 1920; Fes, Morocco
- Died: 12 November 2008 (aged 87–88); Rabat, Morocco

Academic background
- Influences: Ahmad ibn Khalid al-Nasiri

Academic work
- Era: 20th-century
- Main interests: History of Morocco and al-Andalus

Abdelwahab Benmansour (Arabic: عبد الوهاب بن منصور, romanized: ʿAbd al-Wahhāb bin Manṣūr ; born 1920, Fes – died 13 November 2008, Rabat) was a Moroccan historian and civil servant. His most important work is "Tribes of Morocco" (Arabic: قبائل المغرب), a historical study of Moroccan tribes and their origins. He also edited some previously unpublished works such as a 15th-century detailed manuscript about the history of Ceuta as well as works by al-Baydhaq and Ibn Tumart, the eminent Imam and spiritual leader of the Almohads.

Abdelwahab Benmasour was the official histographer of the Kingdom of Morocco working under Mohammed V, Hassan II and Mohammed VI.

== See also ==
- Évariste Lévi-Provençal
- Abdallah Laroui
- Emilio García Gómez
- Abdelhadi Tazi
