= Abdallah Laroui =

Moroccan philosopher, historian, and novelist

- عبدالله العروي
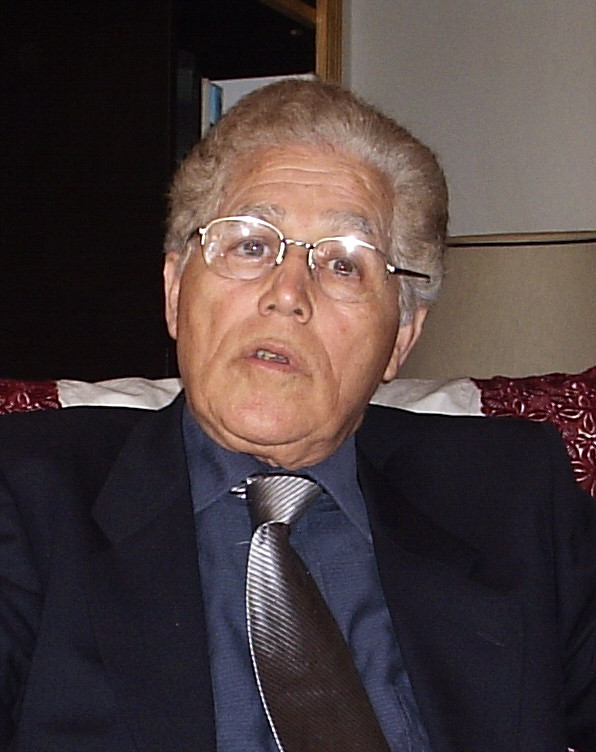
- Born: 1933 (age 92–93); Azemmour, Morocco

Academic background
- Thesis: Les Origines sociales et culturelles du nationalisme marocain, 1830-1912 (1976)
- Doctoral advisor: Henri Laoust

Abdallah Laroui (Arabic: عبدالله العروي, romanized: ʻAbd Allāh al-ʻArwī; born 7 November 1933) is a Moroccan philosopher, historian, and novelist. Besides some works in French, his philosophical project has been written mostly in Arabic. He is among the most read and discussed Arab and Moroccan philosophers.

== Biography ==
Laroui was born in 1933 in Azemmour. His mother died when he was two. He studied at the kuttab before entering the public primary school at seven, where he studied from 1941 to 1945. In 1945, he obtained a grant to study at the College Sidi Mohammed in Marrakesh, where he stayed five years. Afterwards he studied at Lycée Lyautey in Casablanca from 1949 to 1951 and at Lycée Gouraud in Rabat from 1951 to 1953. He obtained his baccalauréat in 1953, and then studied history and economics, at the Institut d'Études Politiques in Paris, where he studied under Charles Morazé and Raymond Aron. In 1958, he obtained a Diplôme d'études supérieures. After receiving his agrégation in Islamic studies in June 1963, he was appointed as an assistant professor of history at the Mohammed V University in Rabat. In 1976, he defended his Doctorat d'Etat with a thesis titled "Les Origines sociales et culturelles du nationalisme marocain, 1830–1912" (Social and Cultural Origins of Moroccan Nationalism, 1830–1912) and published it in 1977. Laroui taught at the University Mohammed V until 2000. He has written five novels (o.a. L'Exil (Sindbad-Actes Sud, 1998)).

Historian Albert Hourani describes him as a significant Arab thinker of the post-1967 era. Laroui's philosophy was guided by a Marxist reading of history and a commitment to radical critique of culture, language, and tradition.

== Awards and honors ==
- In 2000, he was awarded the Premi Internacional Catalunya (Catalonia International Prize).
- In 2017, he was awarded the Sheikh Zayed Book Award for "Cultural Personality of the Year", the premier category with a prize of 1 million dirhams.

== Partial bibliography ==
- L'Idéologie arabe contemporaine: essai critique [Contemporary Arab ideology: a critical essay]. Paris: Maspero. 1967.
- L'Algérie et le Sahara marocain [Algeria and the Moroccan Sahara]. Casablanca: Serar. 1976.
- Laroui, Abdallah (1974). La crise des intellectuels arabes: Traditionalisme ou historicisme?. Paris: Maspéro.
  - The Crisis of the Arab Intellectual: Traditionalism Or Historicism?. Translated by Cammell, Diarmid. University of California Press. 1976. ISBN 978-0-520-02971-2.
- Les origines sociales et culturelles du nationalisme marocain: 1830-1912 [The social and cultural origins of Moroccan nationalism, 1830–1912]. Paris: Maspéro. 1977.
- L'Histoire du Maghreb: un essai de synthèse. Paris: Maspero. 1970.
  - The History of the Maghrib: An Interpretive Essay. Princeton, NJ: Princeton University Press. 1977. ISBN 978-1-4008-6998-5.
- Islam et modernité [Islam and modernity]. Paris: La Découverte. 1987. ISBN 978-2-7071-1662-8.
- Islam et histoire. Paris: Albin Michel. 1999. ISBN 978-2-226-19903-4.
- Le Maroc et Hassan II: Un témoignage [Morocco and Hassan II: testimony]. Quebec: Les Presses Inter Universitaires. 2005. ISBN 978-2-89441-084-4.
- The Sunna and Reform. Arab Cultural Center. 2008.

== See also ==
- Abdelwahab Benmansour
