= Hammouda Pacha Mosque =

Mosque in Tunis, Tunisia

Hammouda؛Bay Mosque
- مسجد حمودة باشا
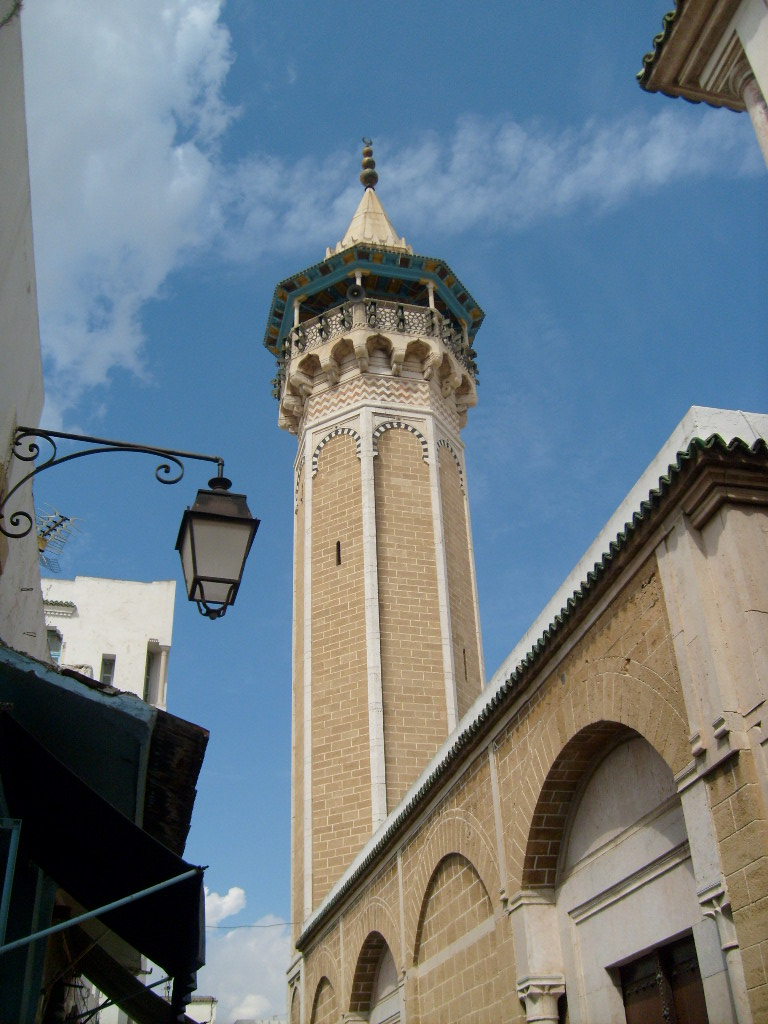

- Tunisia

Religion
- Affiliation: Islam
- Branch/tradition: Sunni

Location
- Location: Tunis, Tunisia
- Coordinates: 36°47′54″N 10°10′15″E

Architecture
- Type: Mosque
- Completed: 1655

Hammouda Bay Mosque or Hamouda Bay al Mouradi (Arabic: مسجد حمودة باشا) is a mosque in Tunis, Tunisia. It is an official historical monument.

== Localization ==
This mosque is located in the Medina area of the city, in the Sidi Ben Arous street.

== History ==
Built in 1655 by Hammouda Bey, it is the second mosque to be built by the Hanafi rite in Tunis.

== Architecture ==
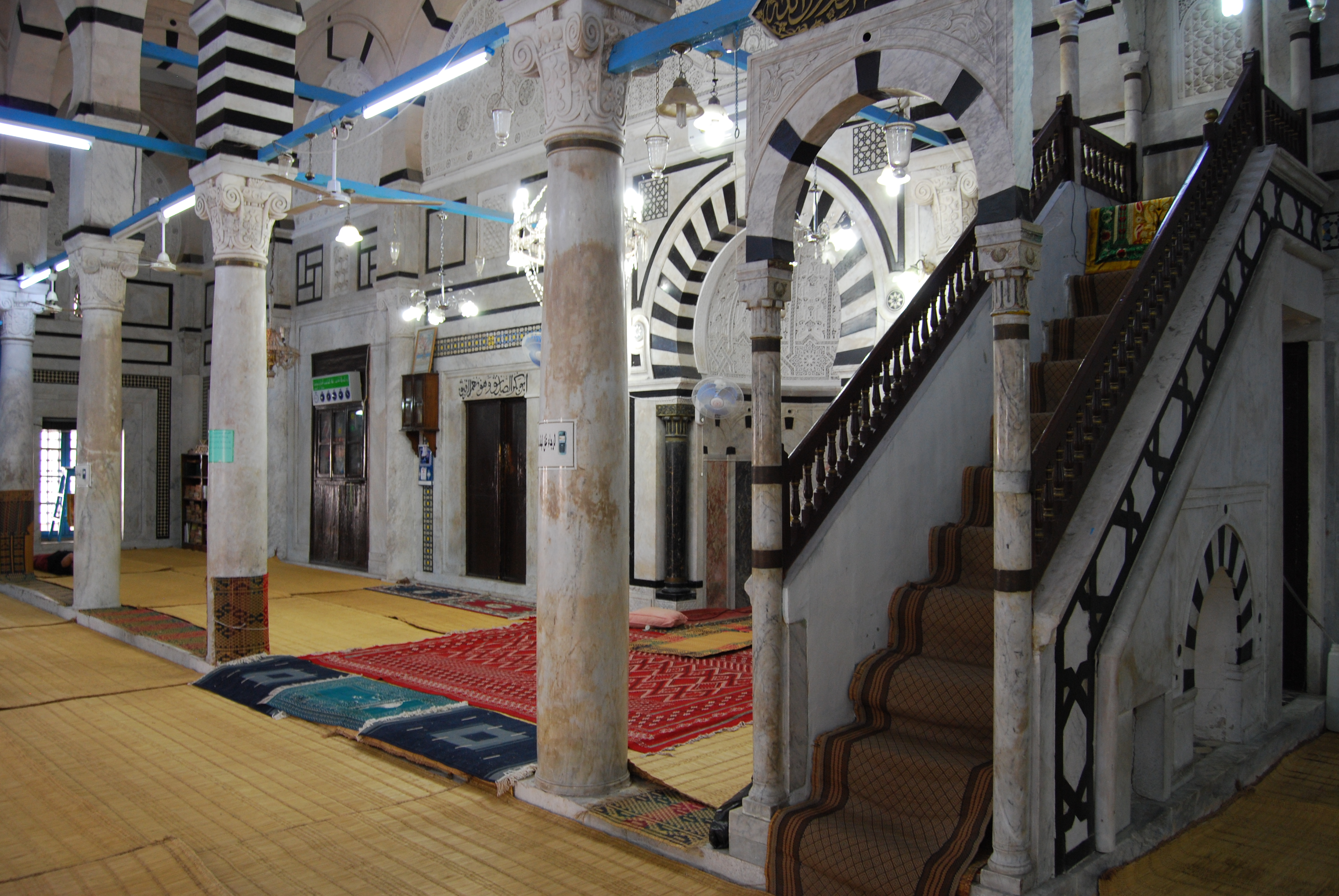
View from the inside of the mosque

The Hammouda Pacha mosque is known for its Ottoman architectural influences. It has an octagon minaret and the hall of prayer is rectangular.

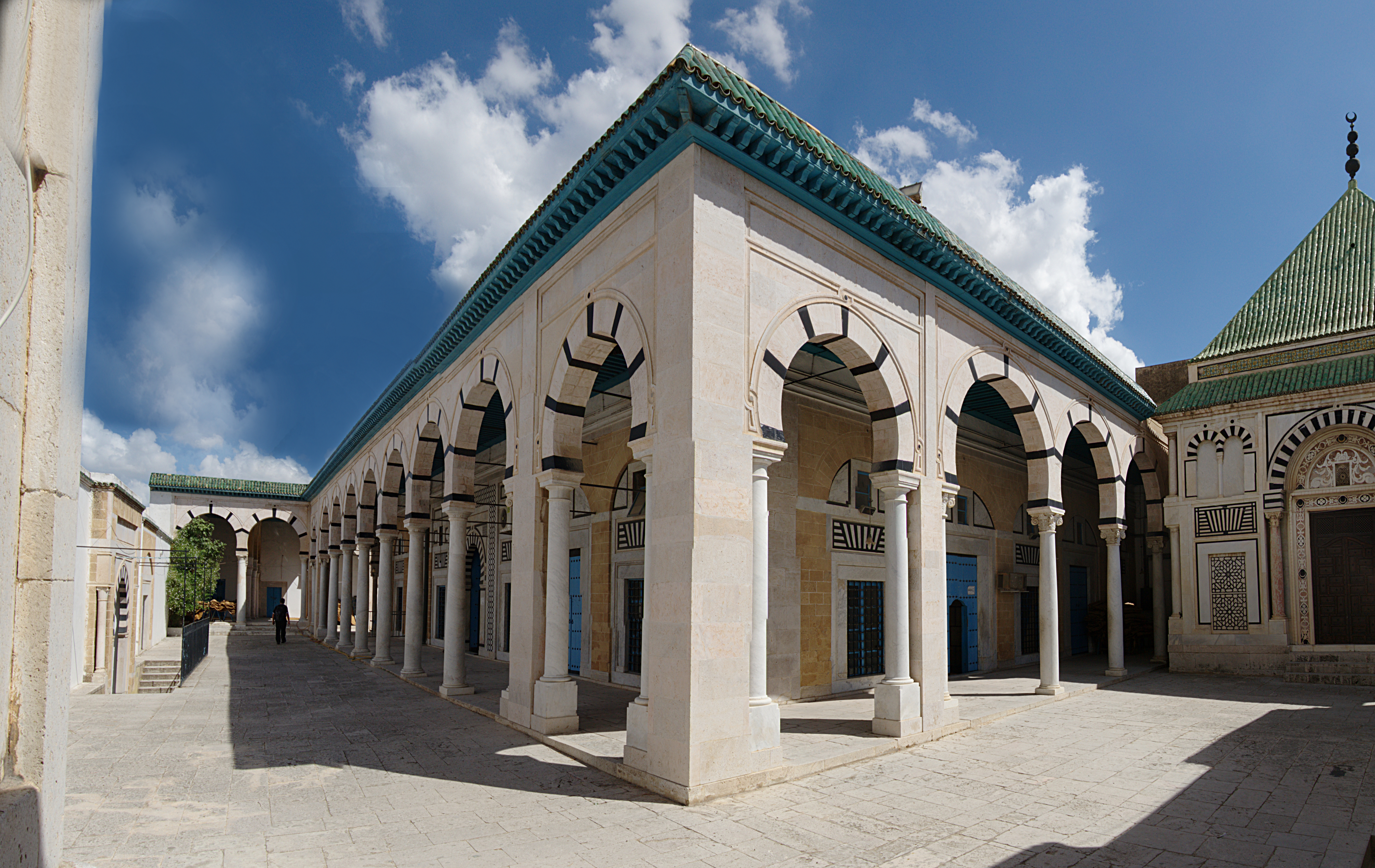
A panoramic view of the mosque

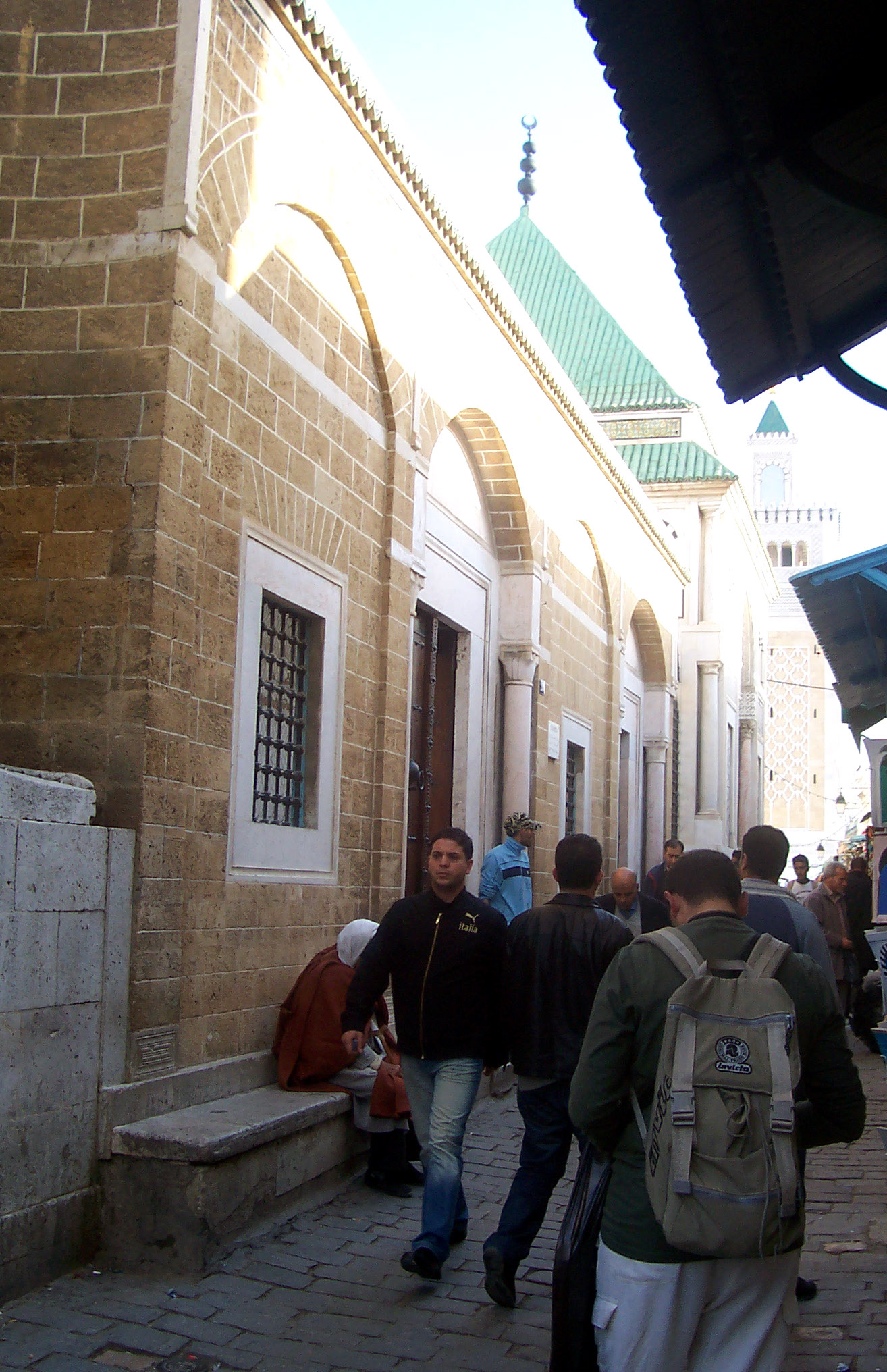
Entrance of the mosque from Sidi Ben Arous street
