= Aziza Othmana =

Tunisian princess

عزيزة عثمانة
- Princess
- Aziza Othmana on a Tunisian stamp
- Born: Fatma Othmana; 1606
- Died: 1669 (aged 62–63); Tourbet Aziza Othmana
- Spouse: Hammouda Basha Bey
- Dynasty: Mouradites

Aziza Othmana (Arabic: عزيزة عثمانة; c. 1606-1669), born Fatma Othmana (فاطمة عثمانة), was a 17th‑century Tunisian princess of the Mouradites dynasty. Born circa 1606, she is remembered as one of the most prominent female figures in Tunisian history, mainly for her extensive charitable works and religious endowments. Notably, Aziza Othmana is recognized for freeing her slaves, purchasing enslaved individuals to grant them freedom, and allocating her entire wealth to support underprivileged communities. She is also credited with the creation and development of several urban structures in Tunis, including the Aziza Othmana Hospital.

== Early life ==
Aziza Othmana was born in 1606 into a family of military leaders. She was the daughter of Ahmed Dey (Abul Al‑Abbas Ahmed Ibn Mohammed Ibn Othman Dey) and the granddaughter of Othman Dey. Both men served as elected military commanders of the province of Tunis under the authority of the Janissary militia. Several historical manuscripts refer to her as "Aziza Bent Ahmed Ben Othman Dey". Although her exact date of birth is not definitively established, historical estimates place it in the early 17th century, based on the recorded year of her death.

She was raised in her grandfather’s palace, Dar Othman, which has been preserved and is open to visitors. At her childhood home she received a comprehensive education. Scholars introduced her to Islamic civilization, Sharia law, Quranic studies. Her education also included civic instruction, literature, poetry, history, humanities and other cultural sciences, which was uncommon for women in Tunisia at the time. This strongly influenced her later philanthropic activities.

== Biography ==
Aziza Othmana was married to Hammouda Pasha Bey, ruler of the Mouradite dynasty. Following her marriage, she left her grandfather’s palace to reside with her husband. Aziza Othmana and Hammouda Pasha Bey reportedly had a son named Ahmed, who was assassinated during her lifetime. an event that is described as a turning point in her life. After this loss she dedicated a large part of her resources and time to aiding the poor and disadvantaged. Historical accounts describe her as socially engaged from a young age and note that she challenged prevailing social norms, particularly through decisions related to property, wealth distribution, and personal status. Contemporary accounts note that Aziza Othmana was not widely known during her own lifetime, despite her extensive actions on behalf of the poor and disadvantaged.

During her lifetime, she performed the Hajj pilgrimage, traveling with her servants and slaves, an uncommon undertaking for women of her time and social status. Aziza Othmana appears in more than 450 documents preserved in the Tunisian National Archives, mainly related to property ownership and charitable endowments.

== Charitable works ==
Aziza Othmana is best known for her extensive charitable and social contributions, which earned her widespread admiration among the people of Tunis. She became popularly known as "Aziza", meaning "beloved".

At an early stage in her life, Aziza Othmana emancipated all her slaves and later created financial support mechanisms for formerly enslaved individuals.

Towards the end of her life, established a major waqf covering more than 90,000 hectares of cultivated land, as well as, urban revenue-generating properties such as bakeries, hammams, warehouses, and shops located in the medina of Tunis. The revenues from these properties were dedicated to numerous charitable causes, including ransoming prisoners and purchasing enslaved people with the sole purpose of freeing them, and later providing dowries for impoverished young women, and supporting social welfare initiatives. She also endowed agricultural land, olive groves, and beaches at the island of Kerkennah for local fishermen, these legal holdings are maintained to this day.

She contributed to urban improvements in the medina of Tunis, notably by financing street lighting. Part of her revenues went to the maintenance of religious buildings in Tunis and in Islamic holy cities Mecca, Medina, and Jerusalem. She also founded and contributed to the financing of a bimaristan located on El Azzafine Street in Tunis. This institution later evolved into what is now known as the Aziza Othmana Hospital.

In her will, she allocated all revenues from her properties to benefit the residents of the medina, dedicating her wealth entirely to community use. Only a portion was retained for her descendants. It was not until 1957 that the habous was dissolved and Aziza Othmana's property was liquidated or nationalized.

== Death and burial ==
Aziza Othmana died in late 1669, corresponding to the year 1080 AH in the Islamic calendar. She was buried in her own tourba (necropolis) at Halqat Al‑Naâl, located at the end of Shamma'iya Alley in the medina of Tunis, near the Shamma'iya Madrasa. The mausoleum features two domes sheltering the tombs of her close relatives. A wooden screen connects the site to the zawiya of Sidi Ben Arous, a revered saint of Tunis, though the two structures were originally separated by a wall.

Aziza Othmana expressed documented in her will was that seasonal flowers be placed on her tomb every day, a practice that has been noted in cultural memory and local history accounts.

== Legacy ==
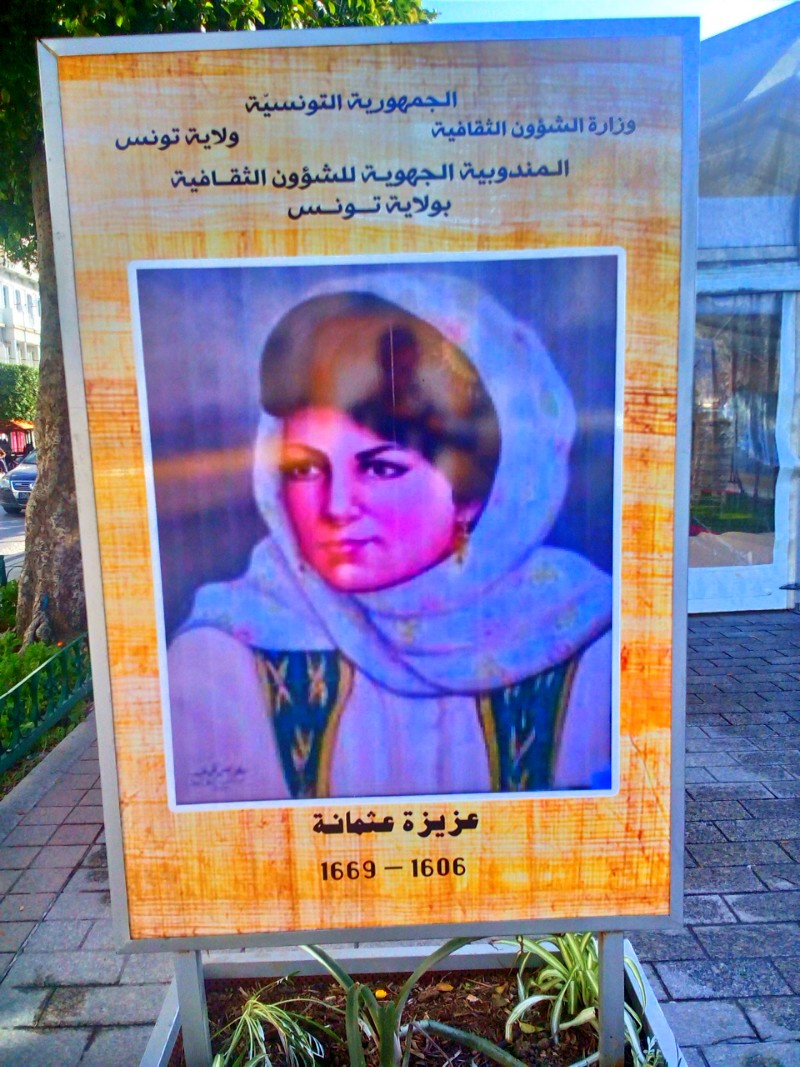
Alleged portrait of Aziza Othmana on display at the book museum in Tunis.

Aziza Othmana’s name is preserved through several public institutions in Tunisia. Her life and actions were documented by the historian Hassan Husni Abd al-Wahhab, who included her in his work Les célèbres Tunisiennes, one of the earliest compilations dedicated to notable Tunisian women. Aziza Othmana is sometimes described in modern literature as an early example of organized social philanthropy in Tunisia.

The Aziza Othmana Hospital in Tunis, renamed in 1960, derives from the bimaristan founded and financed through her charitable endowments in the 17th century. The hospital continues to operate as a public healthcare institution under the Ministry of Health and has undergone periodic renovations and upgrades. In June 2013, the pharmaceutical company Merck Serono awarded the Merck Serono Fertility Grant 2013 to the assisted reproduction laboratory of the Aziza Othmana Hospital, represented by Dr. Amel Zhioua.

Her mausoleum in the medina of Tunis remains a recognized historical site associated with the Mouradite period. Her figure continues to be referenced in contemporary cultural and financial institutions, including educational and corporate initiatives that highlight her role in the history of social endowments in Tunisia.

On 16 December 1985, the Tunisian postal service issued a postage stamp featuring Aziza Othmana as part of a series celebrating Arab figure. The stamp had a 100-millimes denomination and was designed by Tunisian painter Hatem El Mekki. In July 2012, Tunisair named one of its aircraft after her, as part of a program honoring historical Tunisian figures.

== Bibliography ==
- Sophie Bessis, Les Valeureuses: Cinq Tunisiennes Dans L'histoire (2017), Tunis, Elyzad, 2017, 228 p. (ISBN 978-9973-58-090-0), p. 105-133.
- Cities Alliance, An assessment of women’s participation in the Medina of Tunis, Femmedina – Women In The City (Brochure)
