= Hammuda Pasha Bey =

Hammuda Pacha Bey حمودة باشا باي

Bey of Tunis
- Reign: 1631-1666
- Predecessor: Murad I Bey
- Successor: Murad II Bey
- Born: Hammuda ben Murad; Tunisia
- Died: April 13, 1666; Dar El Bey, Tunis
- Spouse: Aziza bent Ahmed ben Othman Dey; Fatma; Hiziyya bent Ali Thabet; Khadija bent Ja'afar; Mira bent Mouhamed Askri El-Hannacha
- Issue: Sidi Murad Bey; Sidi Mohamed el-Hafsi Bey; Mulay el-Hussein Bey
- Dynasty: Muradids
- Father: Murad I Bey
- Mother: Yasmine
- Religion: Islam

Hammuda Pasha Bey (حمودة باشا), died April 13, 1666 was the second Bey of the Tunisian Muradid dynasty. He reigned from 1631 until his death.

== Reign ==
Son of Murad I Bey and an odalisque named Yasmine, both from Corsica, Hammuda was notable for his strength as much as his generosity and concern for his people. During his reign, he led many expeditions against dissident tribes in the northwest and south of the country in order to maintain order and security.

In 1637, Hammuda orchestrated the election of Usta Murad as Dey, commander of the Ottoman military in Tunis. Usta Murad, a friend of his father, was an old corsair, who European sources claim had captured around 900 ships and more than 20,000 prisoners to be sold as slaves at market in Tunis.

He obtained from the subsequent Dey, Ahmed Khodja Dey the right to a force of almost 600 footmen drawn from the sipahis to serve as a bodyguard; their command was guaranteed to the agha of the sipahis. In addition, in his reign the island of Djerba, which belonged to the pasha of Tripoli was definitively annexed by Tunis, although this was in large part the result of Yusuf Dey's diplomatic efforts.

In 1647, at the height of his power, he appointed all the officials and managed to gain control of the janissary force in Tunis. In 1659, the Ottoman sultan Mehmed IV named him pasha of Tunis. But his piratical activities bothered the European powers and France sent a large naval squadron to perform a demonstration of force. Hammuda, wishing to avoid conflict, signed a treaty on 25 December 1665. In it he specifies that Tunisia recognized the preeminence of the French consul over other foreign ambassadors and granted them the right to engage in commerce throughout the whole of Tunisia.

== Achievements ==
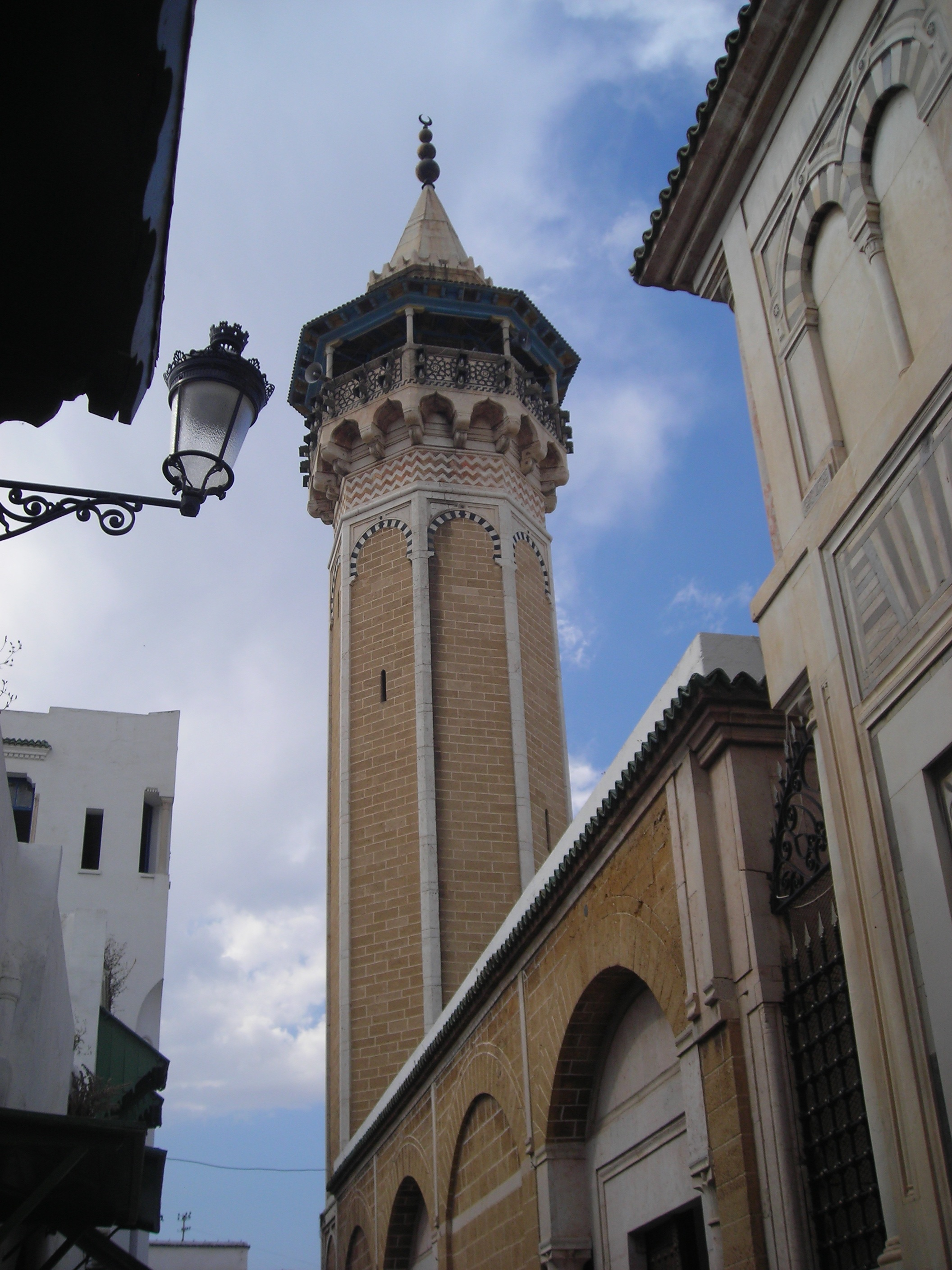
Minaret of the Hammouda Pacha Mosque

Hammuda Pasha established peace and order throughout the country. Bin Abi Dinar al-Kairaouani said of his reign that merchants could move everywhere freely without arms.

A dedicated builder, Hammuda was responsible for the construction of many souks of the Medina of Tunis, as well as many palaces, including the Dar Hammouda Pacha and the predecessor of the modern Dar El Bey. In 1655, he had Ottoman architects build the Hammouda Pacha Mosque in the Turkish style, with an elegant octagonal minaret, below which he constructed his family mausoleum.

Among his other achievements are the construction of a bimaristan (hospital) in the medina of Tunis and the reconstruction, with embellishments, of the mausoleum of Sidi Sahab (mosque of Barbier) at Kairouan. In 1643 he bought the old pleasure palace of the Hafsids at Le Bardo from the divan of the Turkish garrison in Tunis. Composed initially of three pavilions, which he had restored, he aggrandised it by adding orchards, a hammam, a cafe, souks and a funduq for visitors. His son Murad II Bey made this his primary residence, dwelling there almost permanently.

== Marriages and succession ==
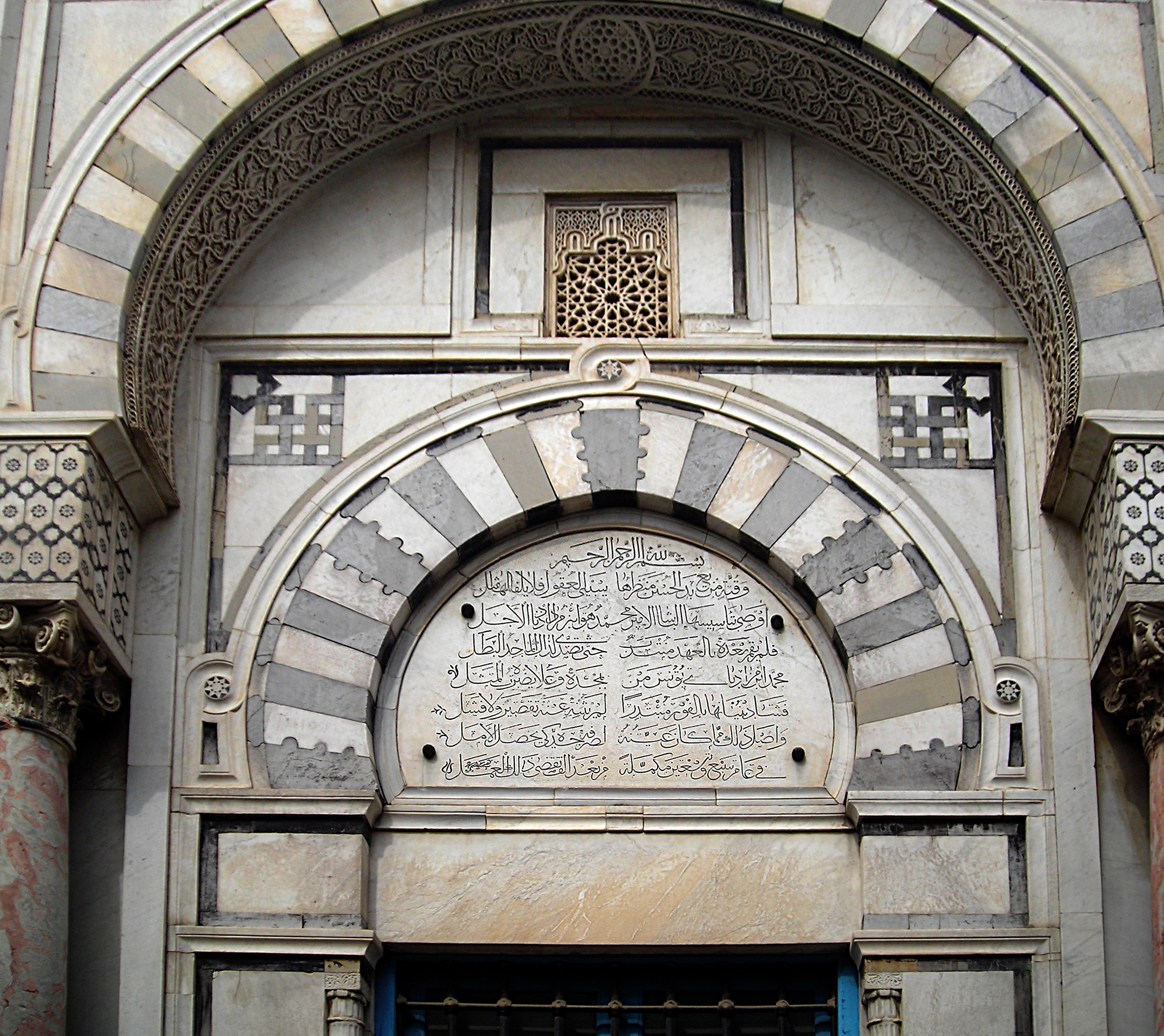
Close up on part of the exterior decoration of the mausoleum, with an inscription mentioning the builder (Hammuda Pasha) and the date of construction.

Hammuda's father had married him to the very popular princess Aziza Othmana, granddaughter of Othman Dey. Her inheritance and the property given to her by Hammuda Pasha made up the most important habous in the country; in totally it is believed to have amounted to almost 90,000 hectares scattered through the whole country. The revenue of these lands financed several funds supporting the needy at the Aziza Othmana hospital as well as the maintenance of religious buildings in Tunis and in the holy cities of Mecca, Medina, and Jerusalem. Only a portion was retained for her descendants. It was not until 1957 that the habous was dissolved and Aziza Othmana's property was liquidated or nationalised.

Hammuda's other spouses reflect mostly the need for political alliances:

- Second spouse: Fatma, daughter of a Turkish odalisque, freed by a Hmida Charfi;
- Third spouse: Hiziyya, daughter of Ali Thabet, an assistant and companion of Yusuf Dey, and mother of Murad II Bey;
- Fourth spouse: Khadija, daughter of the qaid Ja'afar, a rich and treacherous corsair
- Fifth spouse: Mira, daughter of Mouhamed Askri, sheikh of the Hannacha tribe (Algeria–Tunisia border).

In 1663, tired by age, he progressively divested himself of power in favour of his three sons: Murad II Bey received the succession to the Beylik of Tunis, Mohamed el-Hafsi Bey gained the sanjaks of Kairouan, Sfax, Sousse, Monastir and the whole southern part of the country, and the youngest brother Hussein Bey gained the sanjaks on the border with Algeria. Hammuda died in 1666 at Dar El Bey, which he had built so that he could reside closer to his people.

On his death he was buried in the mausoleum located under his mosque, in the corner opposite the minaret.

== General sources ==
- Alphonse Rousseau, Annales tunisiennes ou aperçu historique sur la régence de Tunis, éd. Bastide, Alger, 1864

Preceded by Murad I Bey	Bey of Tunis; 1631–1666	Succeeded by Murad II Bey
