= Tourbet Aziza Othmana =

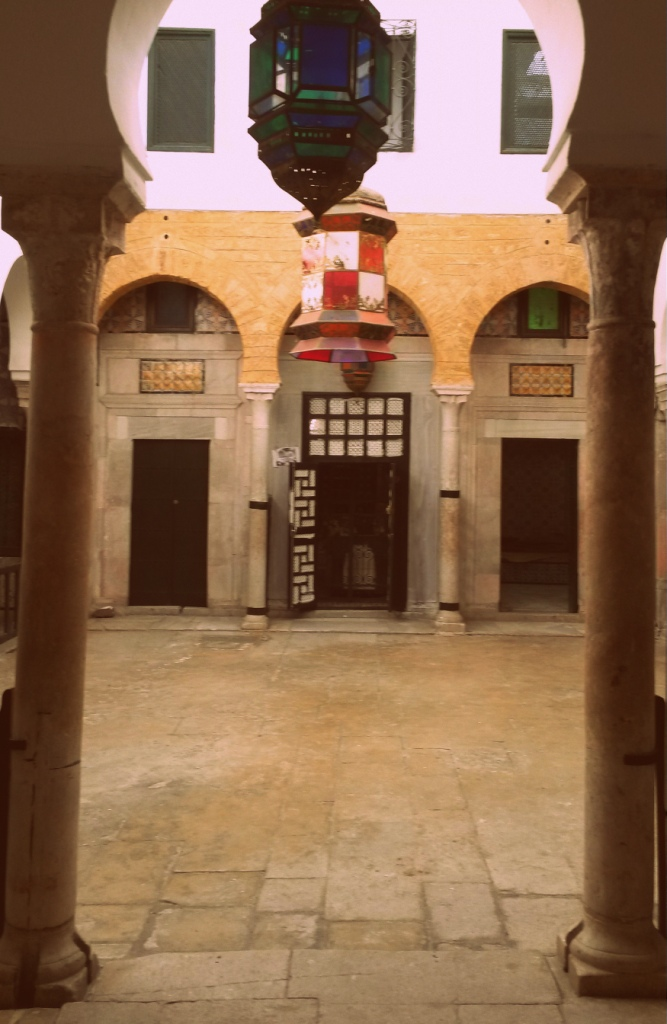

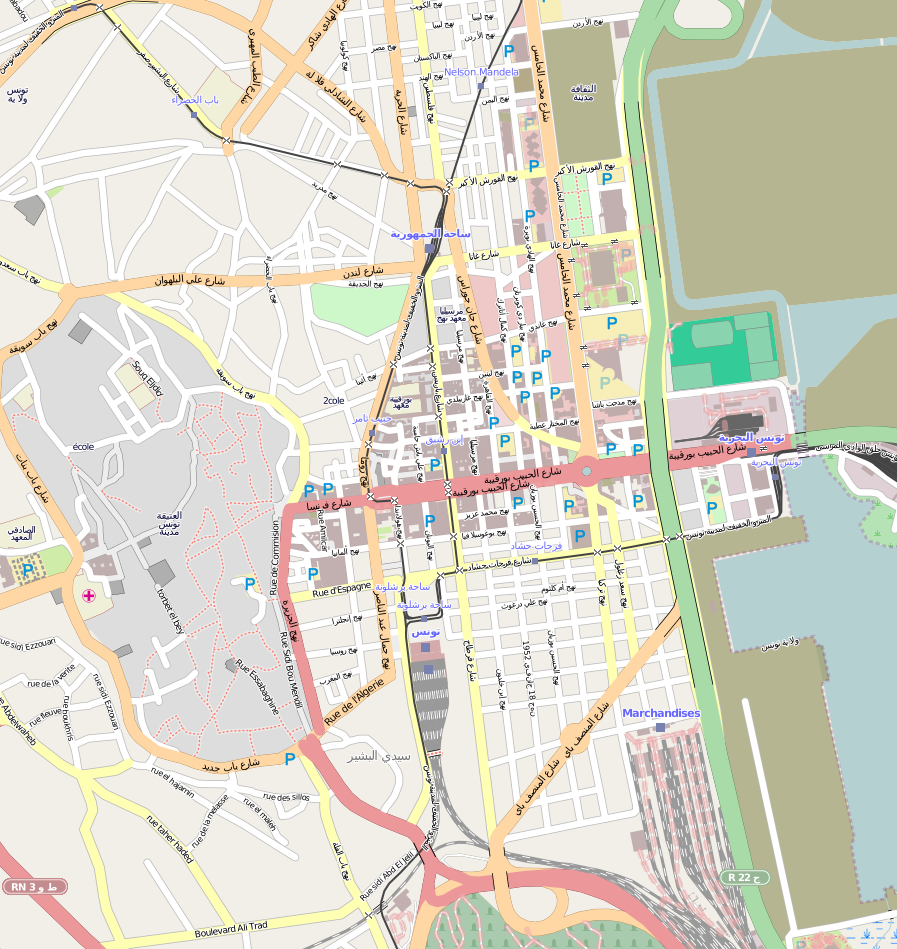
- Location within Tunis
- 36.7981°N 10.1709°E
- Location: Tunis

History
- Built: 20th century

Site notes
- Area: Medina of Tunis

Tourbet Aziza Othmana is a Tunisian mausoleum located in the medina of Tunis, at a place called Halqat Al-Naâl1, at the end of the Ech Chamaiya impasse. It's not far from the Ech Chamaiya medresa.

== History ==
The mausoleum is built by Hussein I, the first Husseinite bey, whose wife is a descendant of Princess Aziza Othmana.

On January 25, 1922, it is classified as a monument.
