= Dar El Bey =

Palace in the Tunis medina, Tunisia

Coordinates: 36.797753°N 10.169065°E

- دار الباي
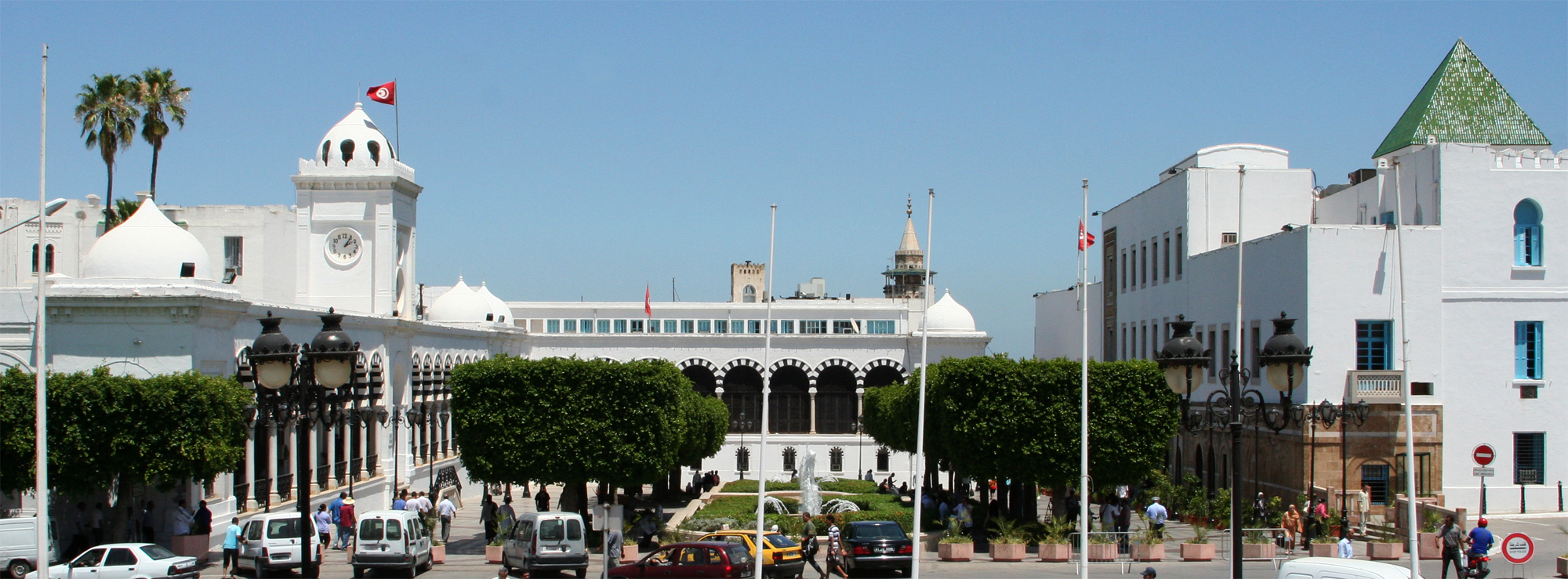
- Interactive map of the Dar El Bey area

General information
- Type: Palace
- Architectural style: Moorish architecture Tunisian architecture
- Location: Medina of Tunis, Tunis, Tunisia
- Year built: 17th Century
- Client: Hammuda Pasha Bey Mouradi

Dar El Bey (Arabic: دار الباي), also known as the government palace (Arabic: قصر الحكومة) is an old palace in the medina of Tunis, more precisely in the city's Kasbah. Nowadays, it serves as the office of the Head of Government of Tunisia but was used by guests of the State previously. It is located south of Government Square, west of Kasbah Square.

== History ==
The palace was built in the 17th century during the reign of the Muradid Bey Hammuda Pasha Bey. In 1795 the Husainid Bey Hammuda Ibn Ali added another floor to it. Henri Dunant considers it as «the most beautiful moorish royal house in the world».

It became the main office for the Head of the Tunisian government even before the independence. Mustapha Kaak was the first to fill that position.

== Architecture ==
The palace's decoration is rich and diverse. These rooms are distinguished by their special rooftops highly decorated with painted scenes and precious materials, as well as Andalusian style faience. The courtyard is paved in white marble and surrounded by a portico.

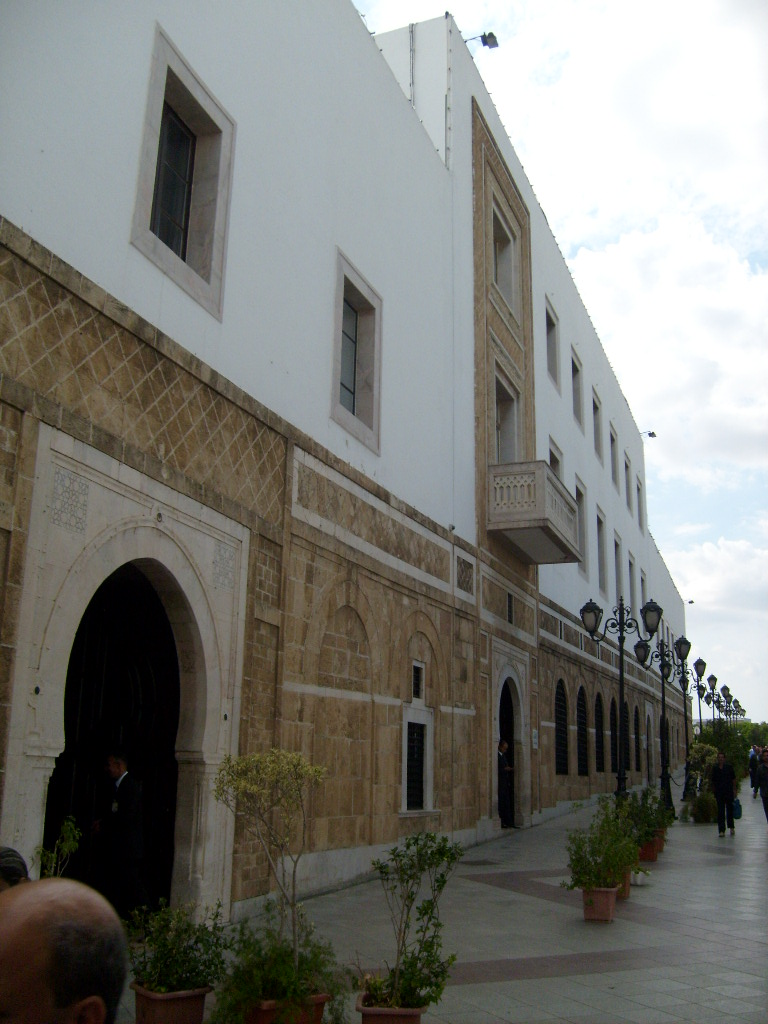
Façade of Dar El Bey in the Kasbah

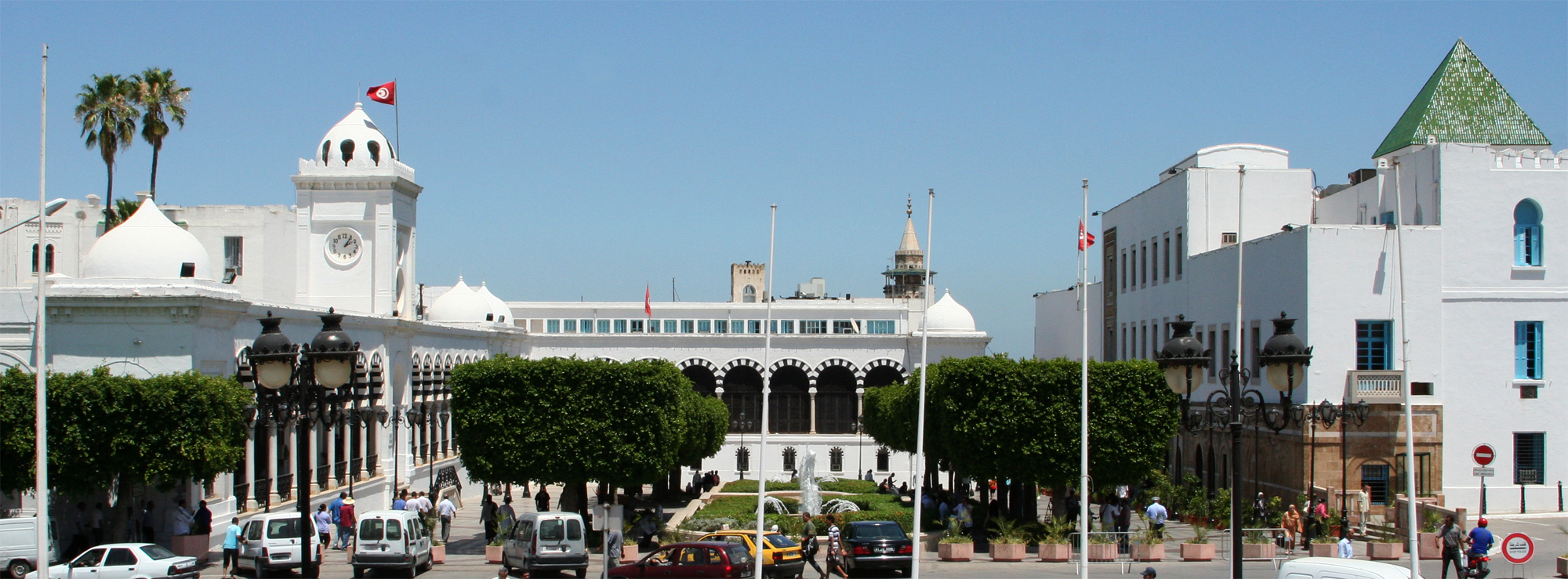
General view of the palace
