= Hatem El Mekki =

Tunisian painter (1918–2003)

- An example of Hatem El Mekki artwork
- Born: May 16, 1918; Batavia, Dutch East Indies (now Jakarta, Indonesia)
- Died: September 23, 2003 (aged 85); Carthage, Tunisia
- Education: Lycée Carnot de Tunis
- Known for: Postage stamp designs for Tunisia (from 1957); Coin design for Tunisia (1988–1990); Chinese-influenced aquarelle technique
- Style: Painting; Watercolour; Poster design Illustration
- Awards: First Poster Prize, Paris (1947)

Hatem El Mekki (May 16, 1918 – September 23, 2003) was a prominent Tunisian painter. He was born in Batavia, Dutch East Indies, and died in Carthage in 2003.

From 1957, his artwork appeared on a large number of postage stamps of Tunisia. El Mekki drew the head of the coin used in Tunisia from 1988 to 1990.

== Education ==
El-Mekki arrived in Tunis in 1924 and studied at the Lycée Carnot de Tunis. During his time there, he developed a distinctive Chinese aquarelle (watercolour) technique, despite being unaware at the time of his partial Chinese heritage.

== Career ==
In 1947, El-Mekki received the First Poster Prize in Paris. During his time in Paris, El-Mekki associated with prominent art and literary figures, including Albert Camus (Nobel Prize in Literature laureate), philosopher Gaston Bachelard, Gertrude Stein, Daniel-Rops, and others. He also illustrated works by international authors from the United States, Australia, France, Scotland, and Germany.
