= Islamic civilization =

Islamic civilization may refer to:

- Islamic Golden Age
- Reception of Islam in Early Modern Europe
- Muslim world
- Caliphate
- Islamic culture
- Ummah

== See also ==
- History of Islam
