= Dar Ben Ayed =

Palace in Tunis

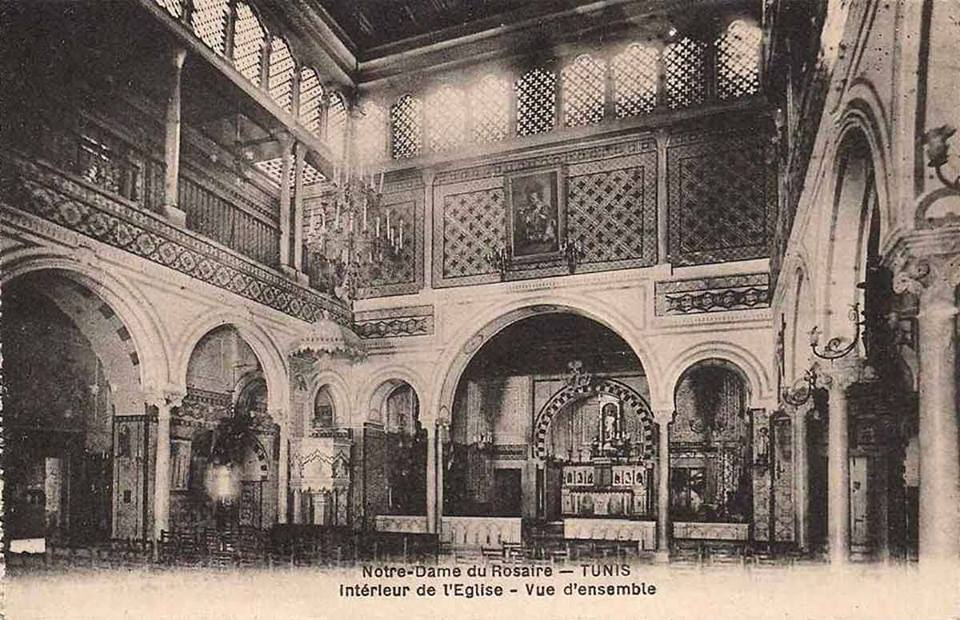
- Courtyard of Dar Ben Ayed

General information
- Type: Palace
- Architectural style: Moorish; Tunisian; Ottoman
- Location: Medina of Tunis, Tunis, Tunisia
- Year built: 18th Century
- Client: Rajeb Ben Ayed

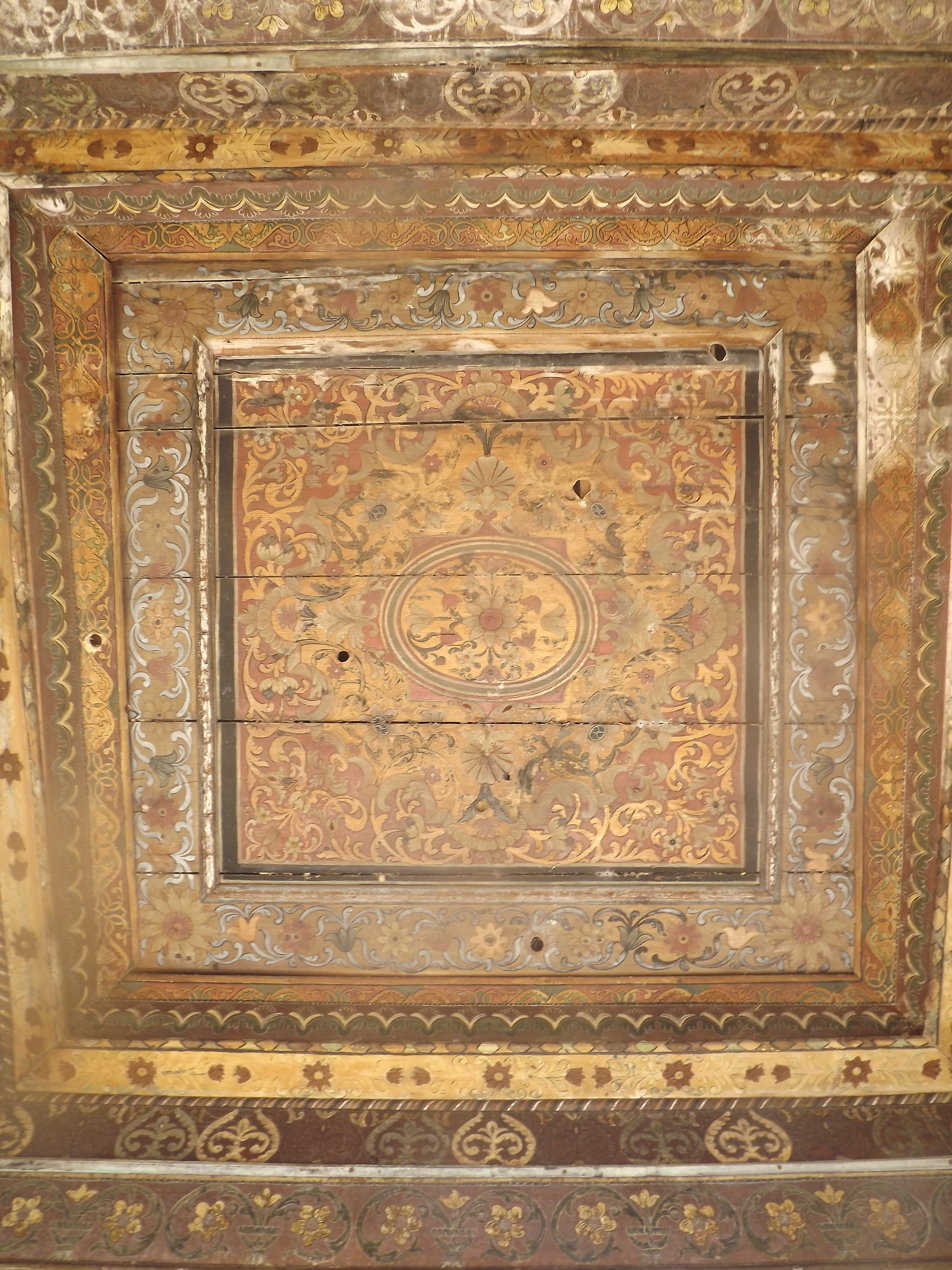
The interior of Ben Ayed Palace

Dar Ben Ayed is an old palace of the medina of Tunis. It is located in the Ben Ayed Street in Bab Jedid, near Tourbet el Bey and Souk Es Sabbaghine.

It is indexed as one of the big residences of Tunis, in the inventory of Jacques Revault, member of the Middle East and Mediterranean Studies Research Group.

== History ==
The palace was built at the end of the 18th century by the qaid Rajeb Ben Ayed. Many members of his family intervened in the construction like his brother the qaid Hmida Ben Ayed, the ambassador and advisor Mohamed Ben Ayed, and his son, the qaid Abderrahmane Ben Ayed, with the help of Rashid al-Shakir Sahib al-Taba'a, the main minister during the reign of Al-Husayn II ibn Mahmud.

The general Rachid Ben Abdallah Al Hanafy bought the palace and kept it under his possession until his execution by Muhammad III as-Sadiq in 1867.

On 18 March 1999, the residence got classified as an historical monument.

== Architecture ==
The palace has many apartments, common parts, indoor gardens, rooms for supplies (makhzens), and an oratory.

The decoration is an association of the traditional and Italian styles with white marble, painted wooden ceilings and Italian faience.

- First part: Huge makhzens, spacious vestibules (driba), an oil mill, a floor for hosts (sraya) and some big reception rooms separated by a beautiful hall;
- Second part: a big loggia divided into alcoves, a garden, a resting room (kushk), three suites and a courtyard;
- Third part: the master house, a floor for hosts, makhzens and stables;
- Fourth part: ground floor with a first floor, a floor for hosts and makhzens.
