= Souk Es Sabbaghine El Saghir =

Coordinates: 36.794369°N 10.173966°E

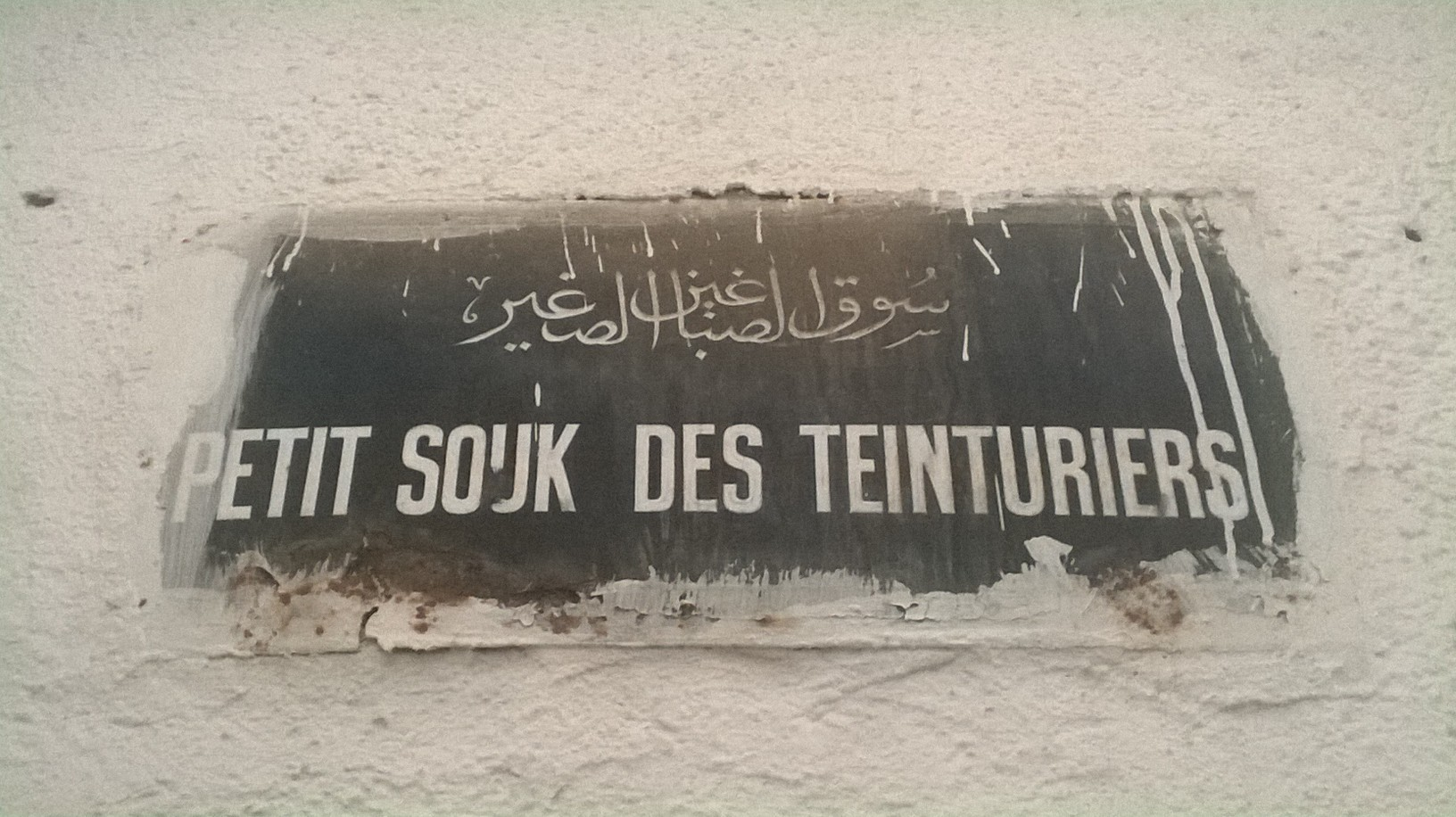
Metallic sign of Souk Es Sabbaghine El Saghir

Souk Es Sabbaghine El Saghir (Arabic: سوق الصباغين الصغير) or small dyers' market is one of the souks of the medina of Tunis.

== Etymology ==
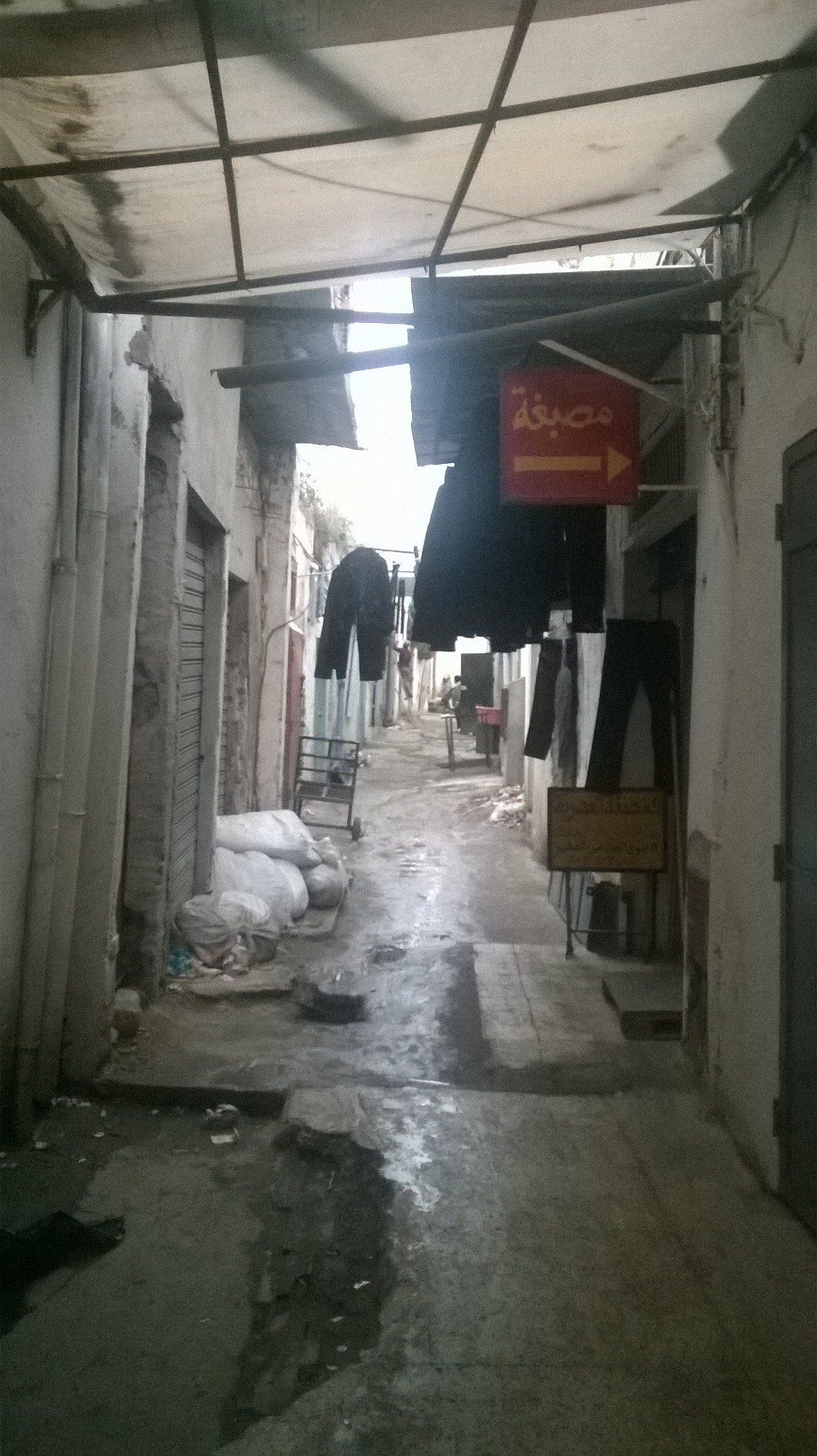
A dyeing shop in the souk

The souk is a small alley in Souk Es Sabbaghine. That's why it is called Souk El Saghir (the small market).

== Location ==
It links Souk Es Sabbaghine (the big market) to Sidi Zahmoul Street.

It is situated in the outskirt of the medina of Tunis, far from Al-Zaytuna Mosque center because dyeing is considered as a polluting activity.

== History ==
Few informations are clear about this souk's history. But it is considered as an extension of the main one (Souk Es Sabbaghine).

There are still some dyeing shops in it.
