= Souk Es Sabbaghine =

Traditional market in the medina of Tunis

Coordinates: 36.7938°N 10.1751°E

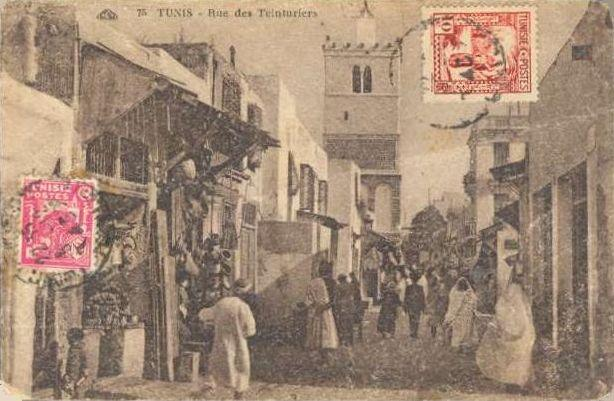
Es Sabbaghine, location of the souk in 1940.

Souk Es Sabbaghine (English: Dyers market) is one of the souks of the medina of Tunis.

== Location ==
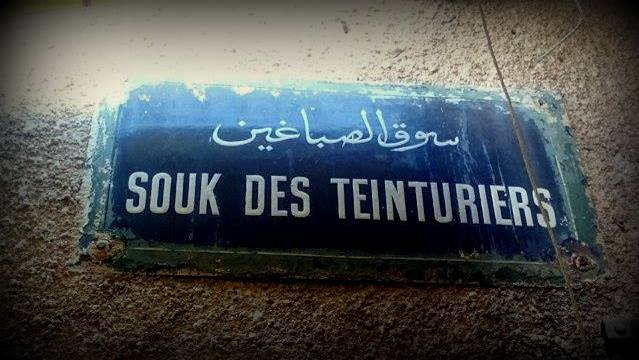
Metallic sign indicating Souk Es Sabbaghine.

The souk is situated at the outskirts of the medina, far from the center where the Al-Zaytuna Mosque is situated, since dyeing is considered a polluting activity. The souk is a continuation of Souk El Blat and may also be accessed from Bab El Jazira.

== History ==
The name of Souk Es Sabbaghine, or Souk of Dyers, is due to its original function as the souk of wool, cotton and silk dyeing which is situated next to a previously existing fountain.

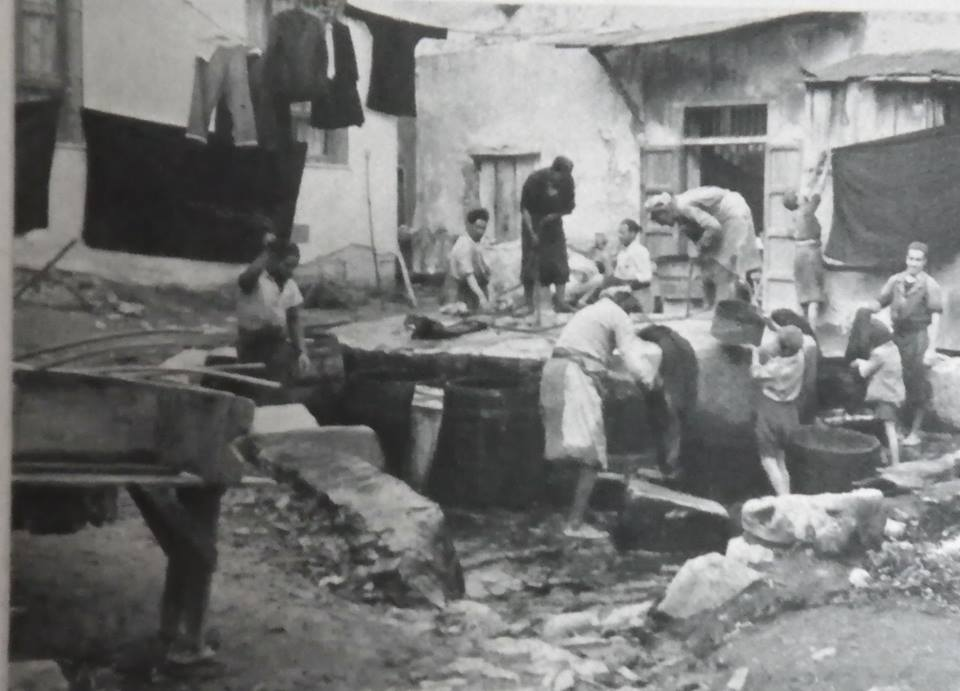
The souk in 1939

Two Italian doctors constructed a dispensary at this souk in 1887 called Infermeria Santa Margherita which supported the poor from Italian and Maltese communities.

== Products ==
Products sold at the souk include clothing, shoes as well as fish and meat.

== Monuments ==
Harmel Mosque, also known as Bab Al Jazira Mosque, is located in souk Es Sabbaghine.

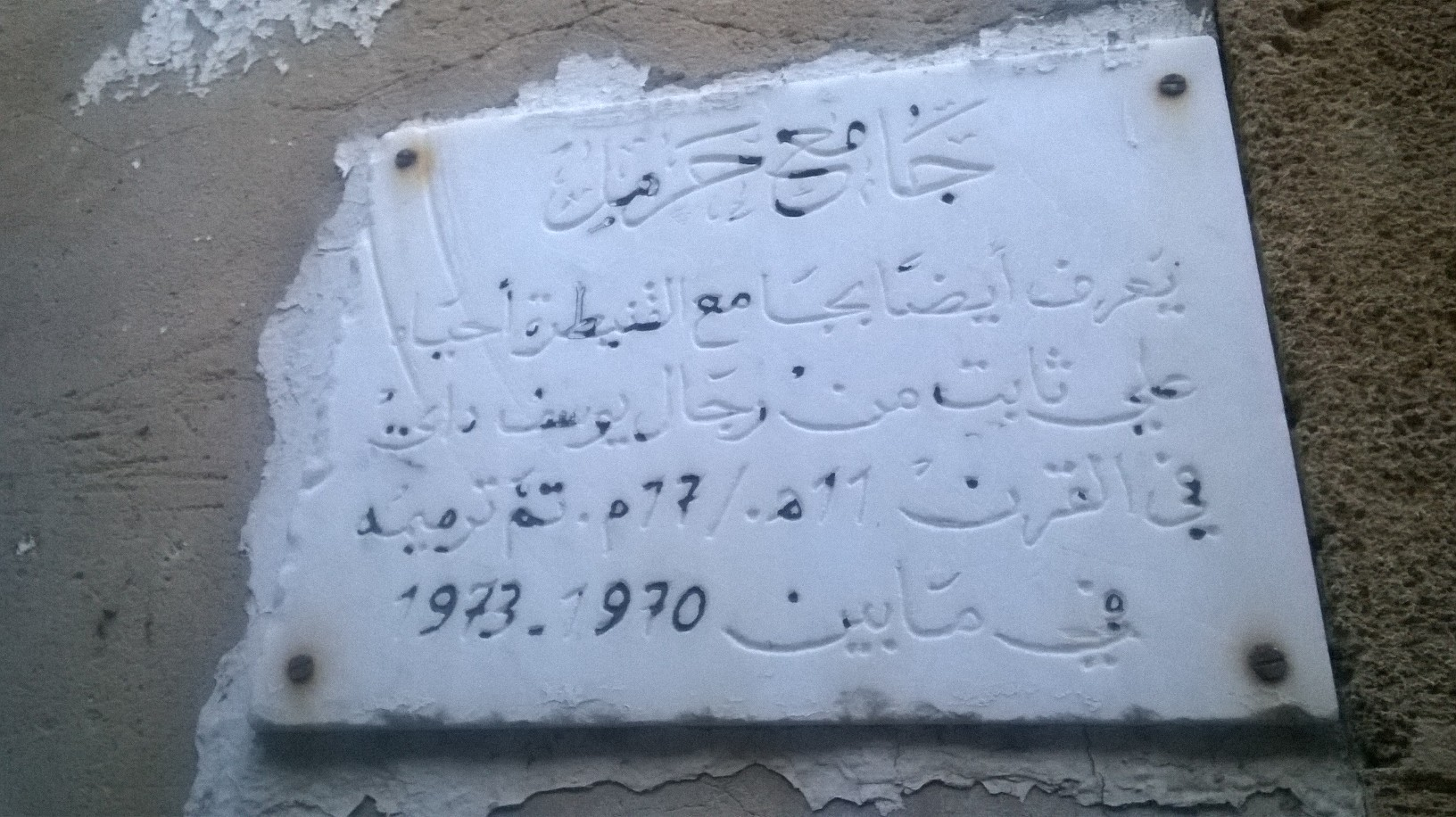
Commemorative sign of the Harmel Mosque

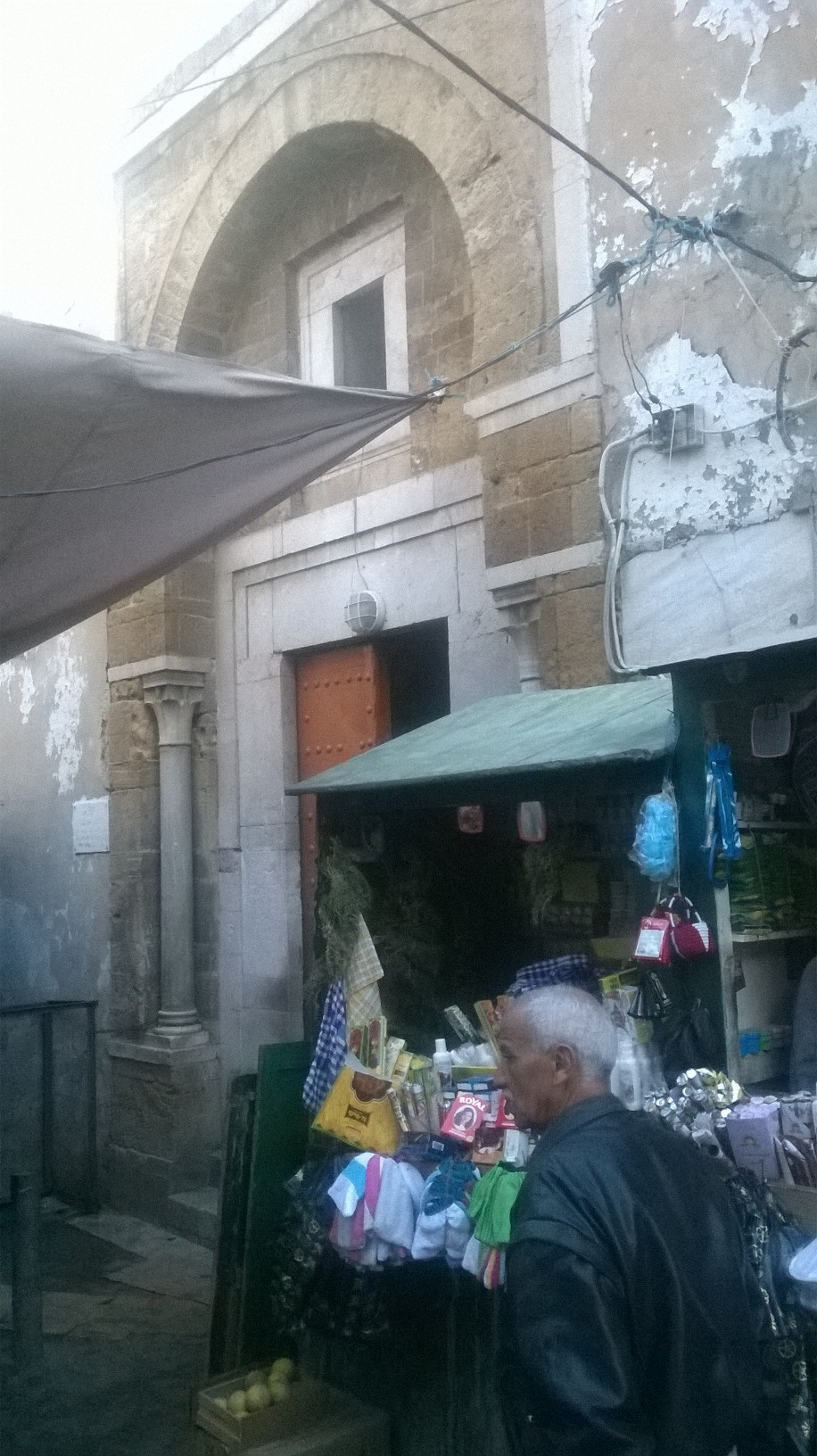
Entrance of the mosque

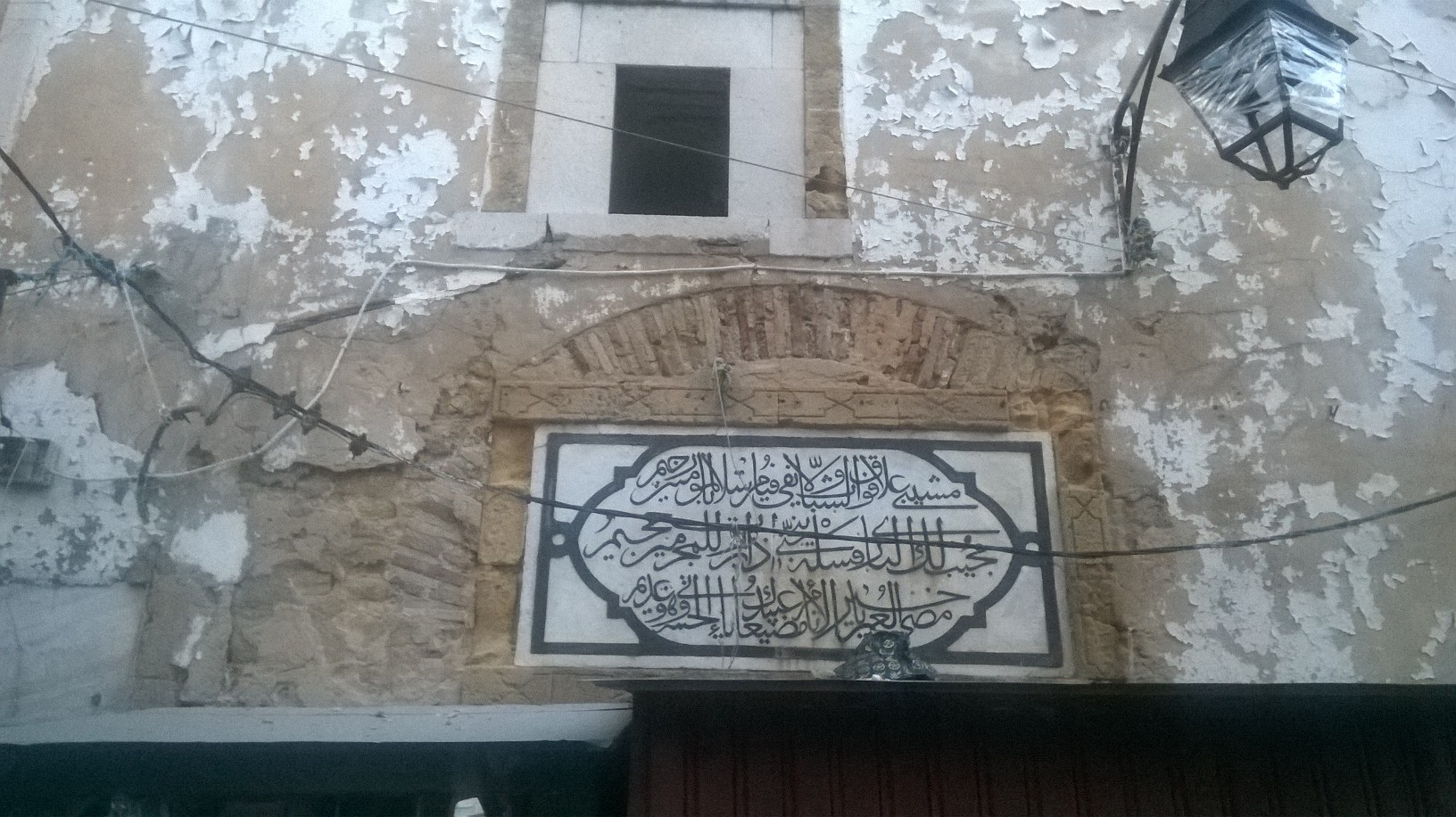
Inscription at the entrance

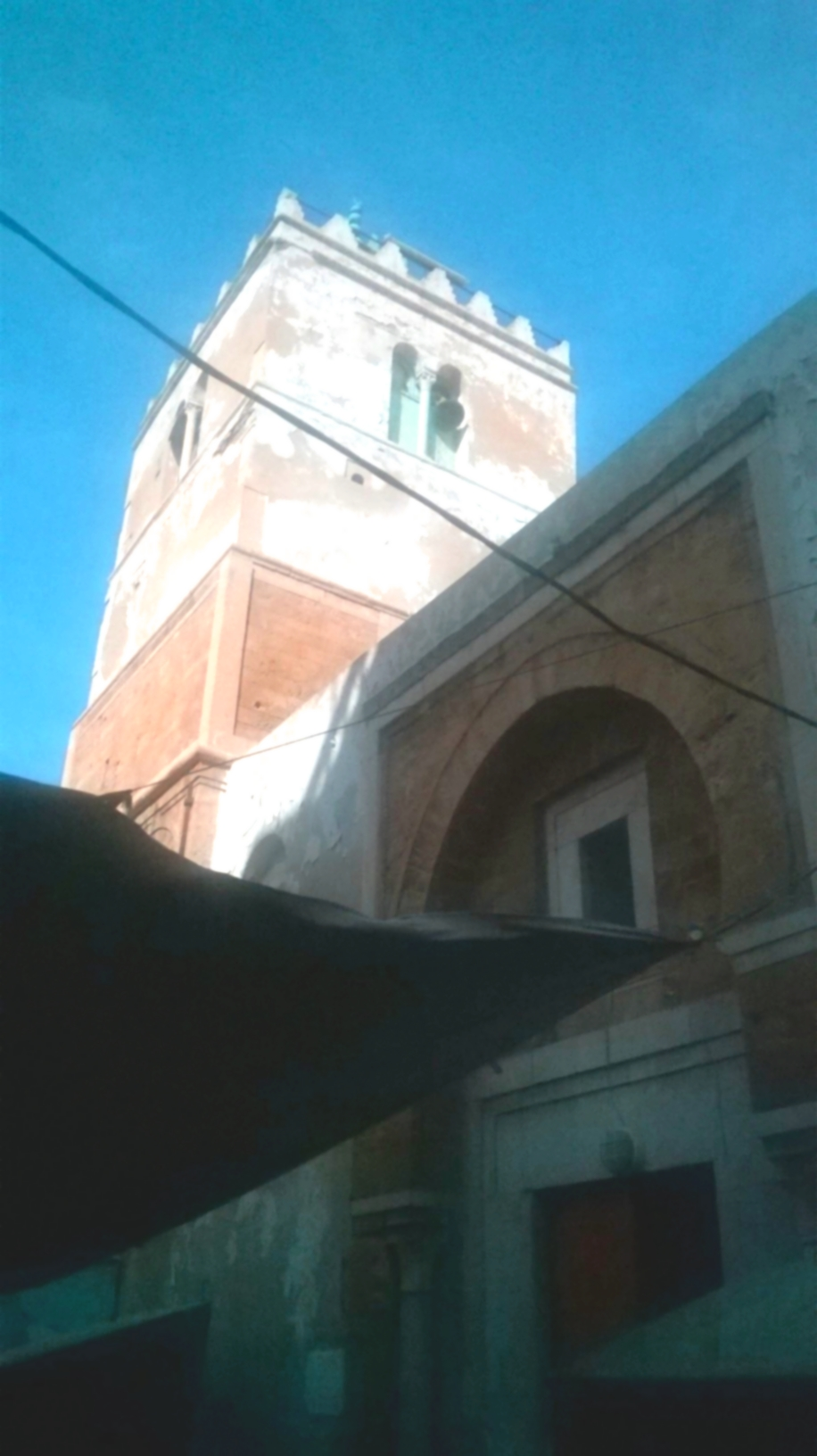
Minaret of the mosque

El Jedid Mosque is situated in the center of the souk.

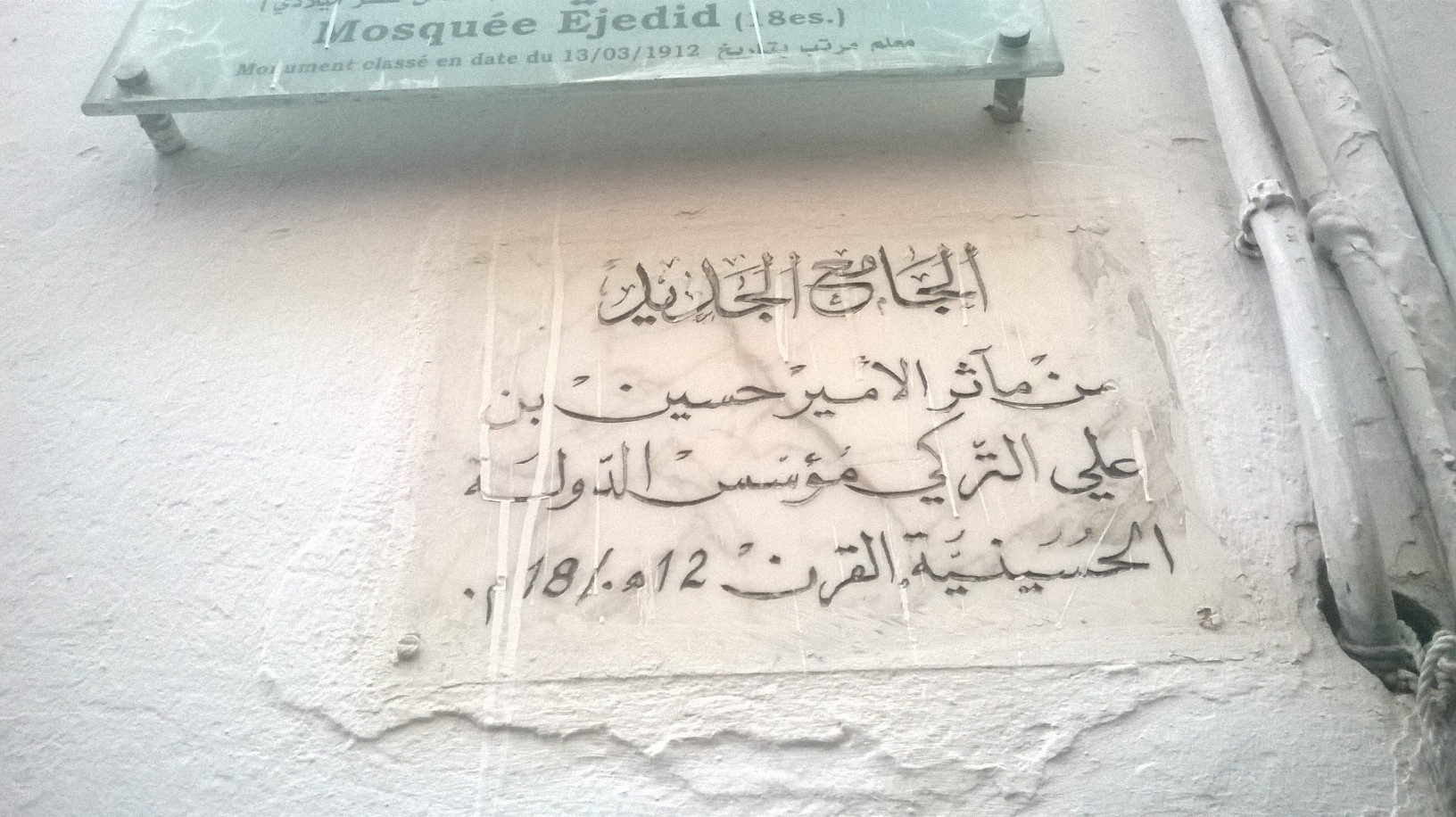
Commemorative sign of the mosque

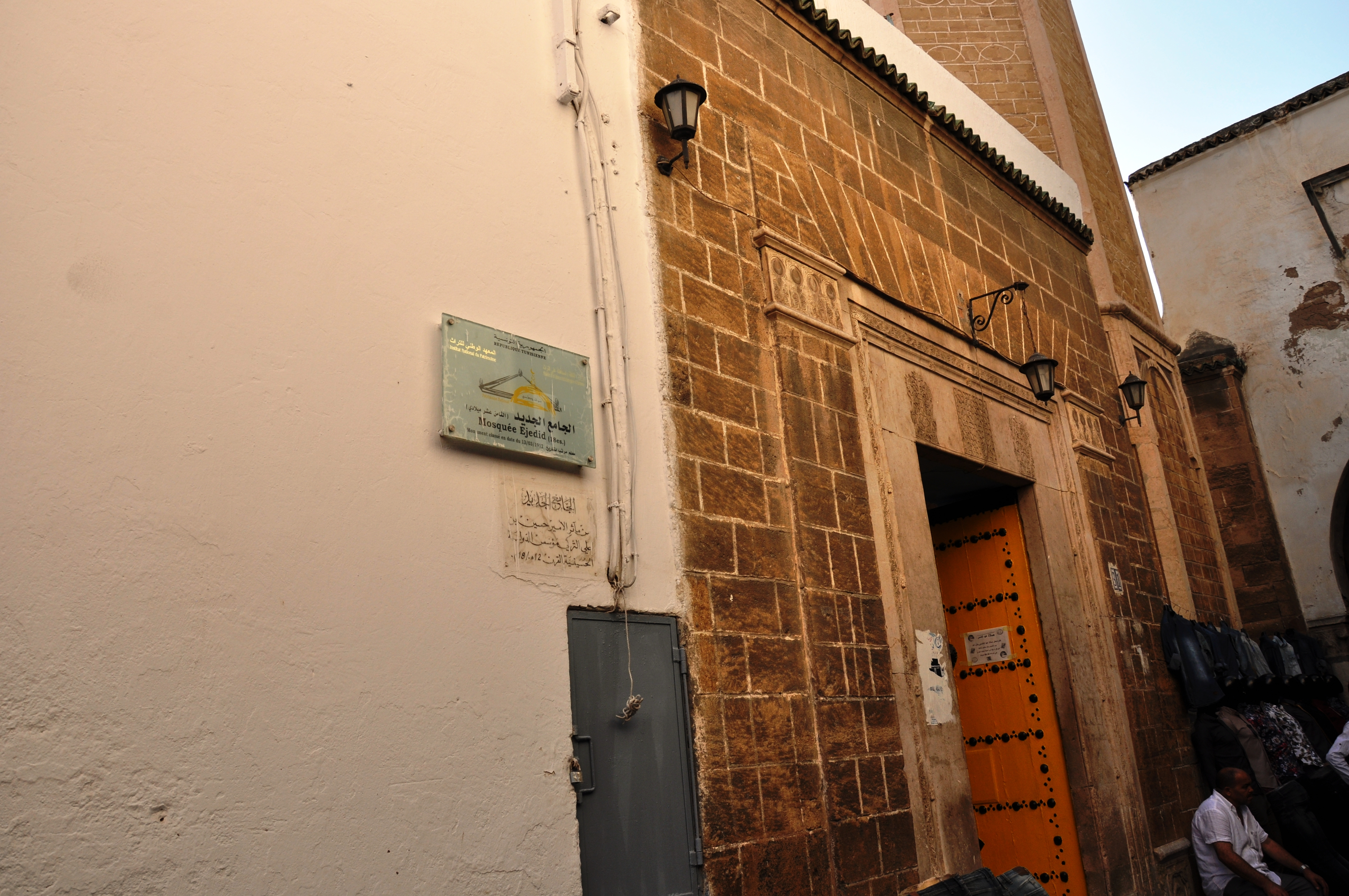
Main entrance of the mosque

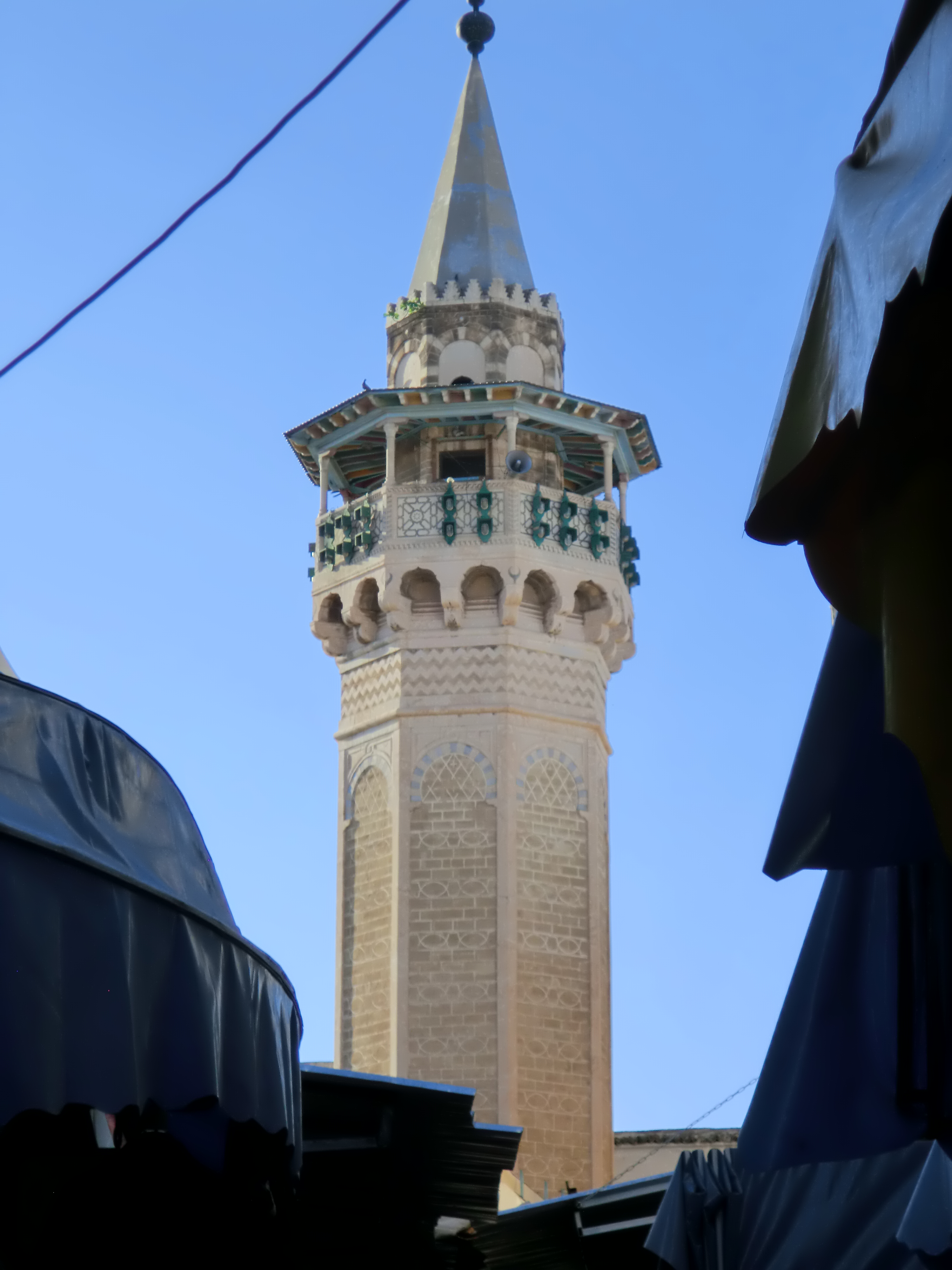
Minaret of the mosque

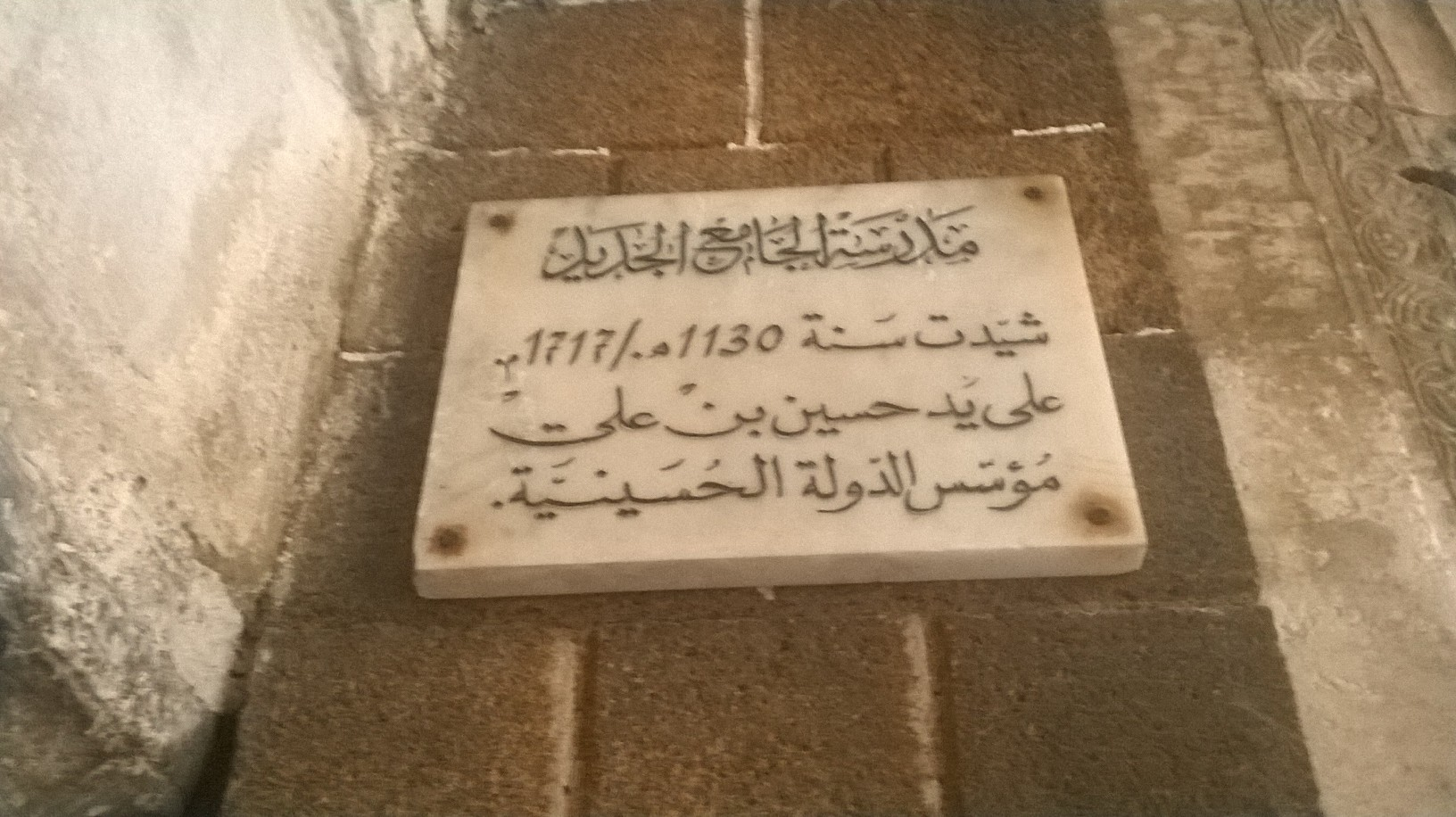
Commemorative sign of the madrasa

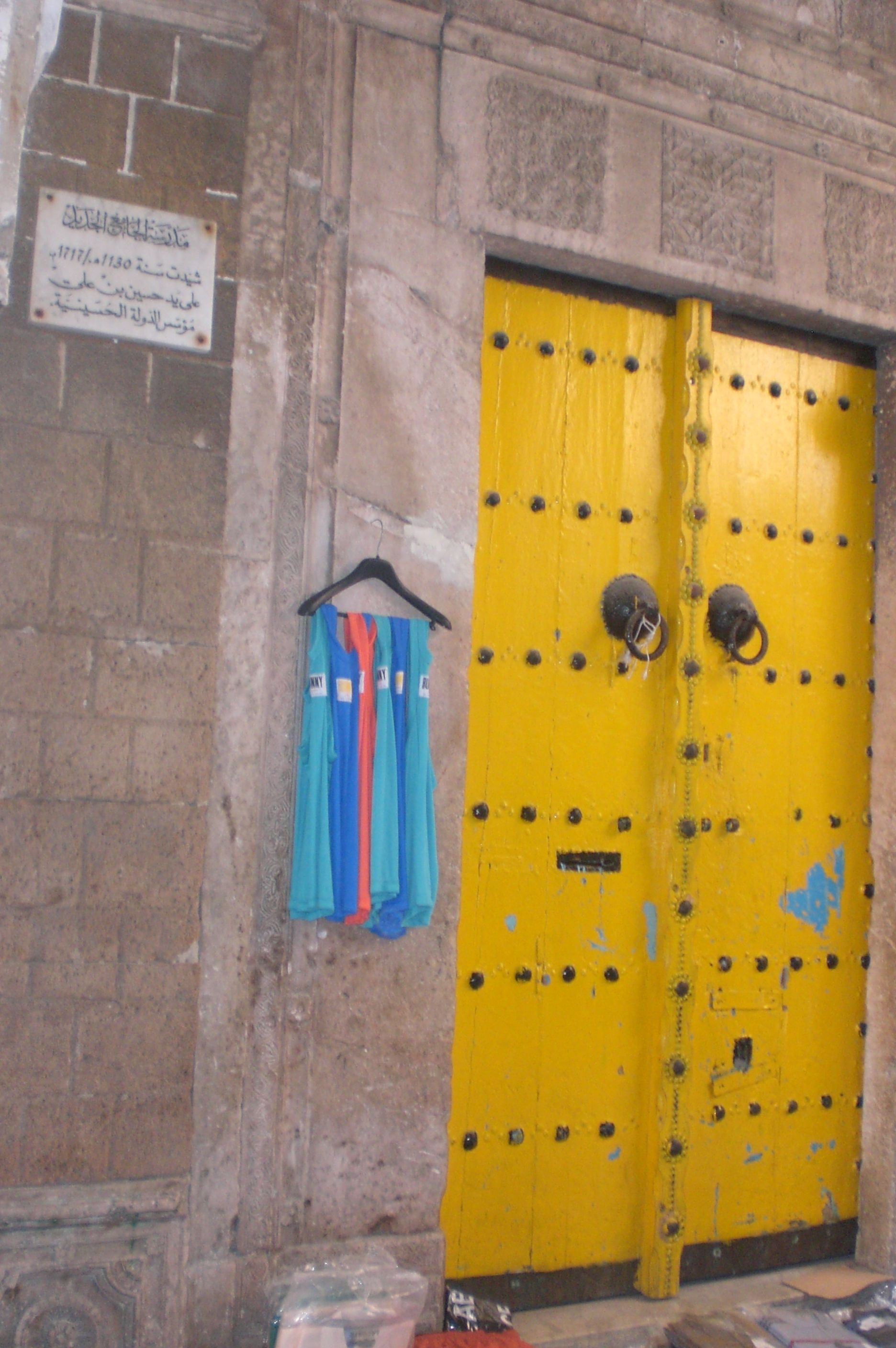
Entrance of the madrasa
