= Harmel Mosque =

Mosque in Tunis, Tunisia

- جامع حرمل
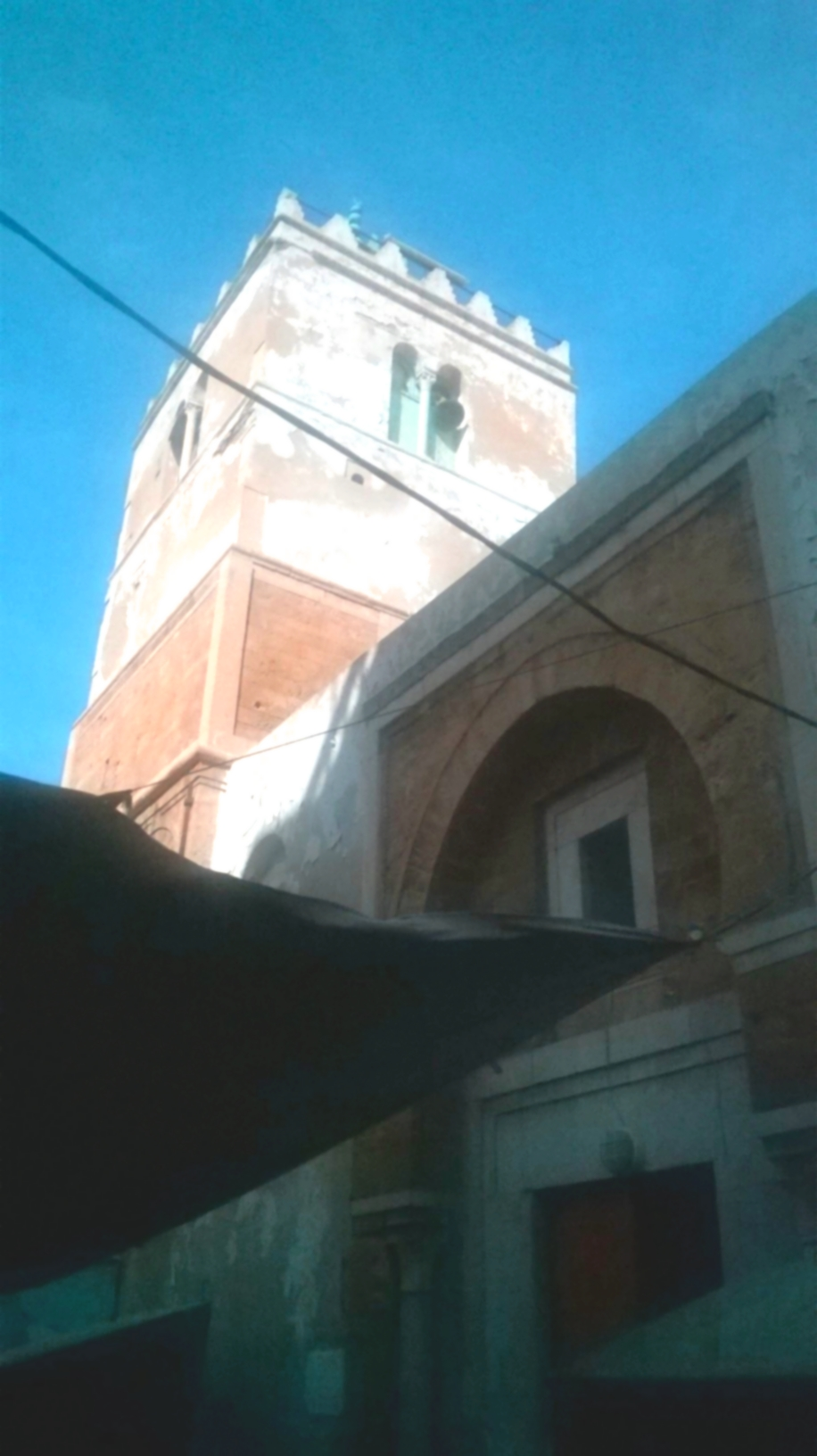

Religion
- Affiliation: Islam
- Branch/tradition: Sunni

Location
- Location: Tunis, Tunisia
- Interactive map of Harmel Mosque
- Coordinates: 36°47′34.0″N 10°10′33.1″E

Architecture
- Type: Mosque

Harmel Mosque (Arabic: جامع حرمل), also known as the Kenitra Mosque (Arabic: جامع القنيطرة), is a Tunisian mosque located at Sabaghine Street in the medina of Tunis.

== History ==
The mosque was built during the Hafsid reign, by Ali Thabet, one of Yusuf Dey's ministers in the 17th century.

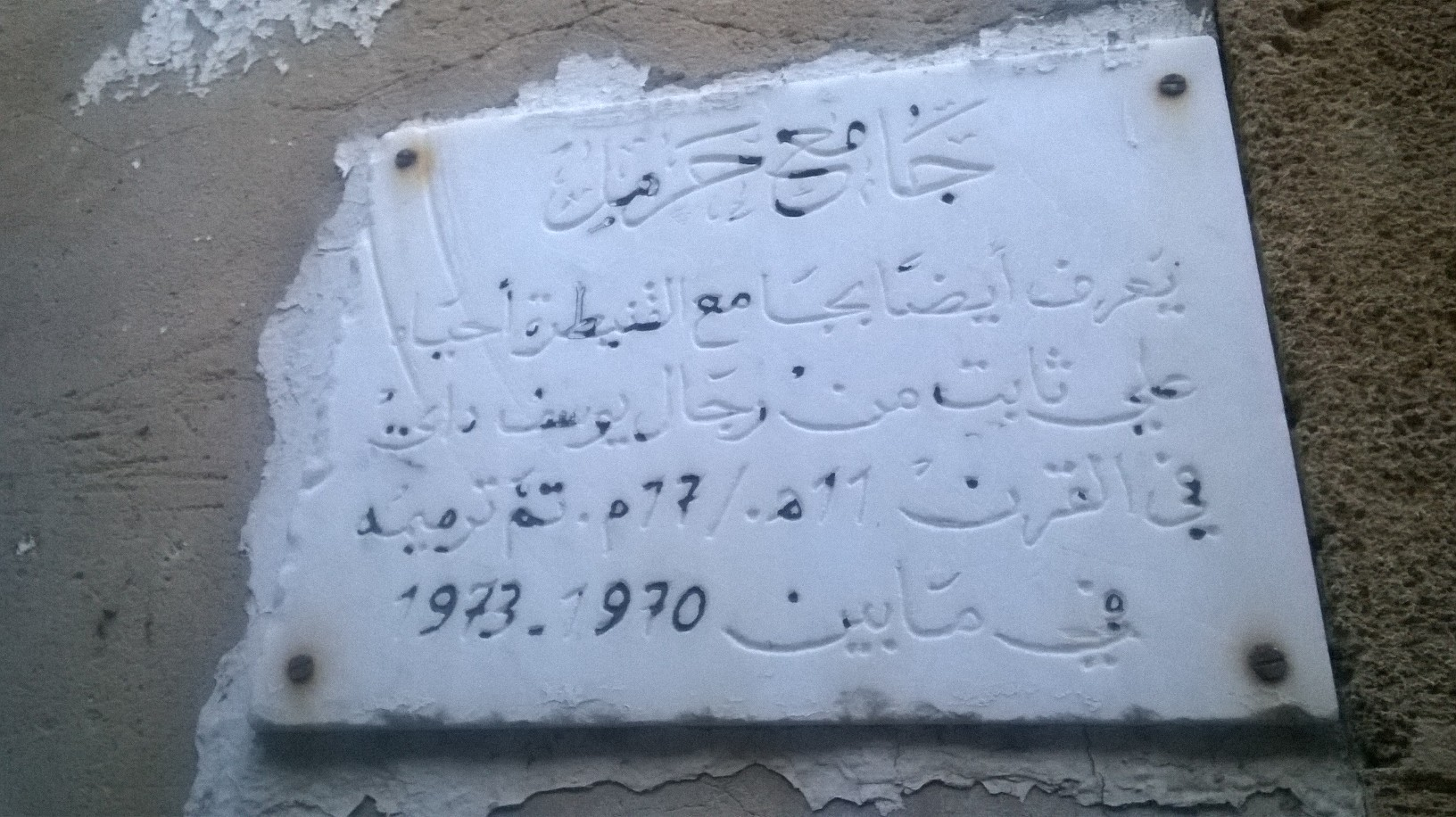
Commemorative plaque of the mosque

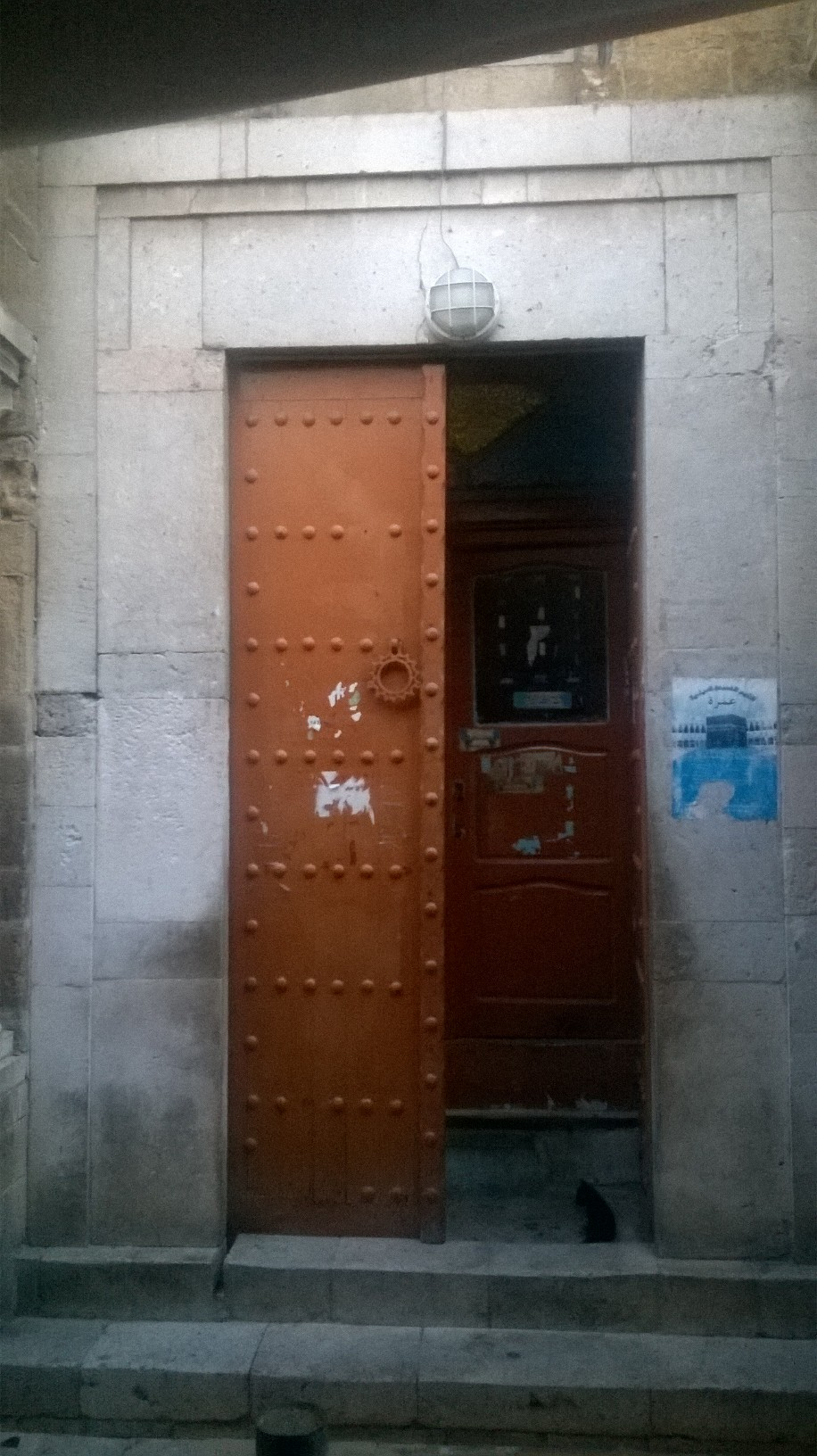
Entrance of the mosque

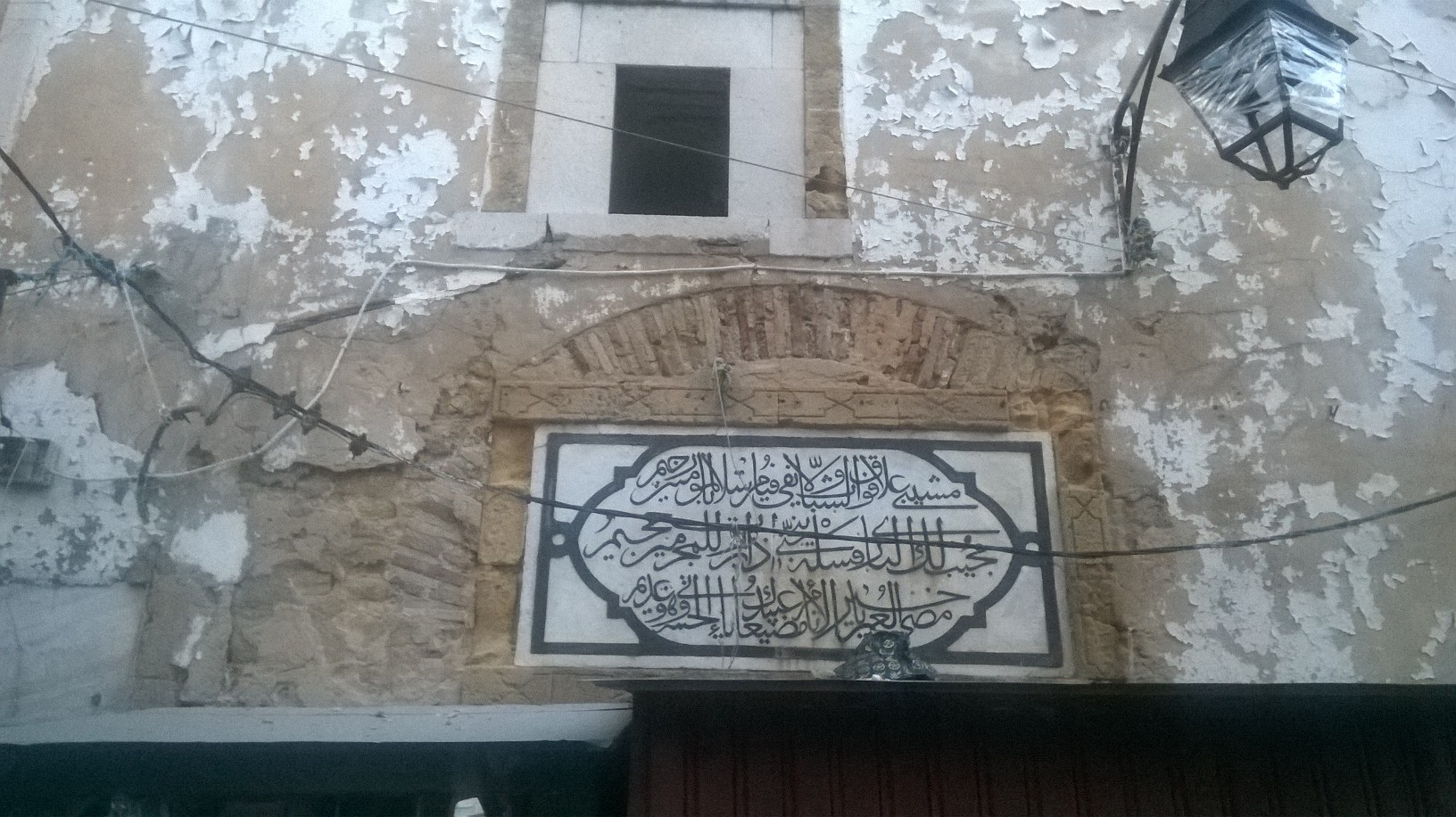
Inscription in top of the mosque's main entrance
