= El Borj Mosque =

Mosque in Tunis, Tunisia

- جامع البرج
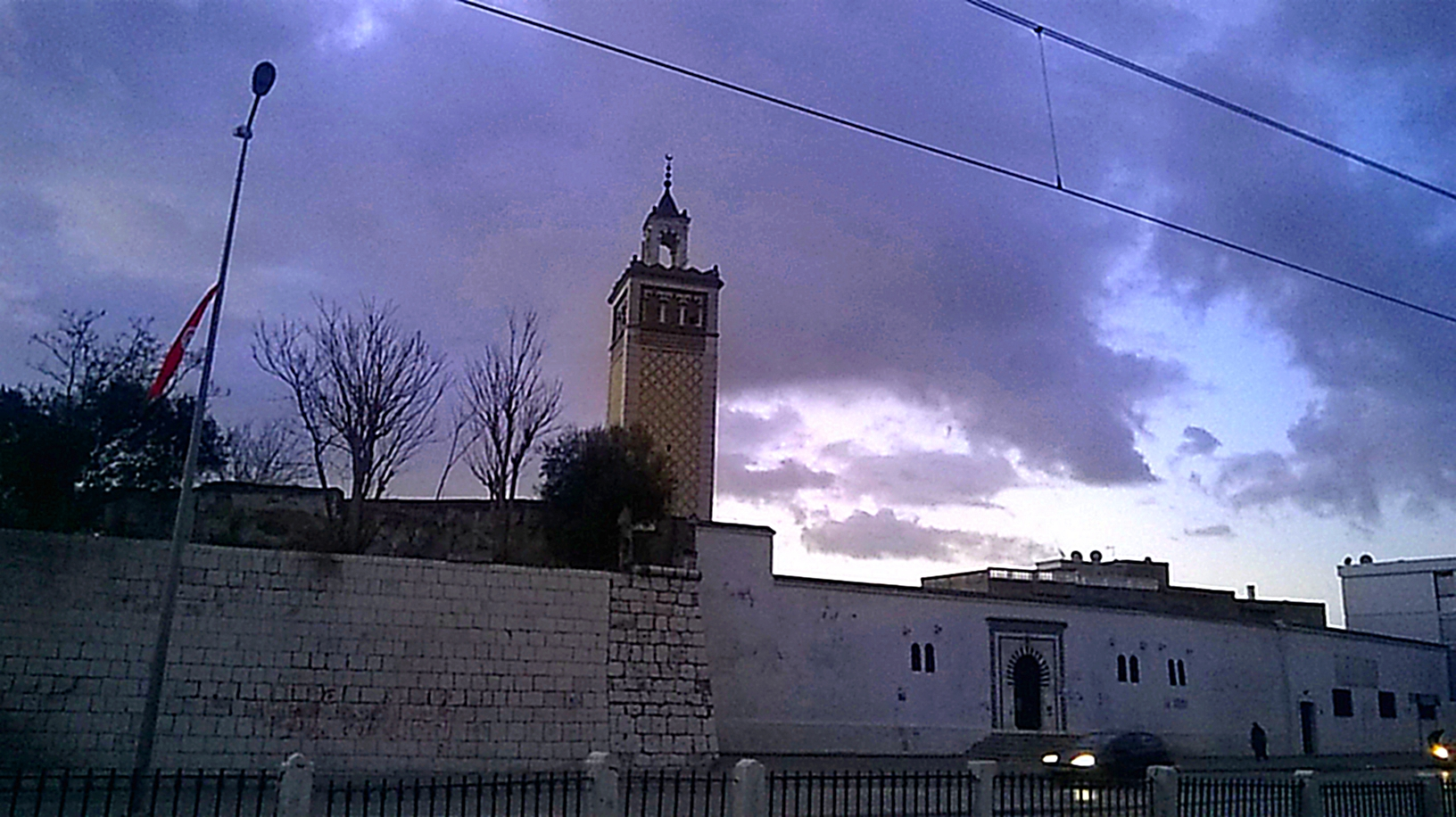

- Location within Tunisia

Religion
- Affiliation: Sunni Islam

Location
- Location: Tunis, Tunisia
- Interactive map of El Borj Mosque
- Coordinates: 36.812318°N 10.167040°E

Architecture
- Type: Mosque

El Borj Mosque or Mosque of the tower (Arabic: جامع البرج), also known as Sidi Yahia Mosque (Arabic: جامع سيدي يحيى) is a Tunisian mosque in the northern suburb of the Medina of Tunis.

== Localization ==
It is located in 1 Hedi Saidi Street near Bab Laassal, one the Medina of Tunis's gates.

== Etymology ==
The mosque got its name from a tour that is near to it and has the name of the saint Sidi Yahia El Slimani El Yamani.

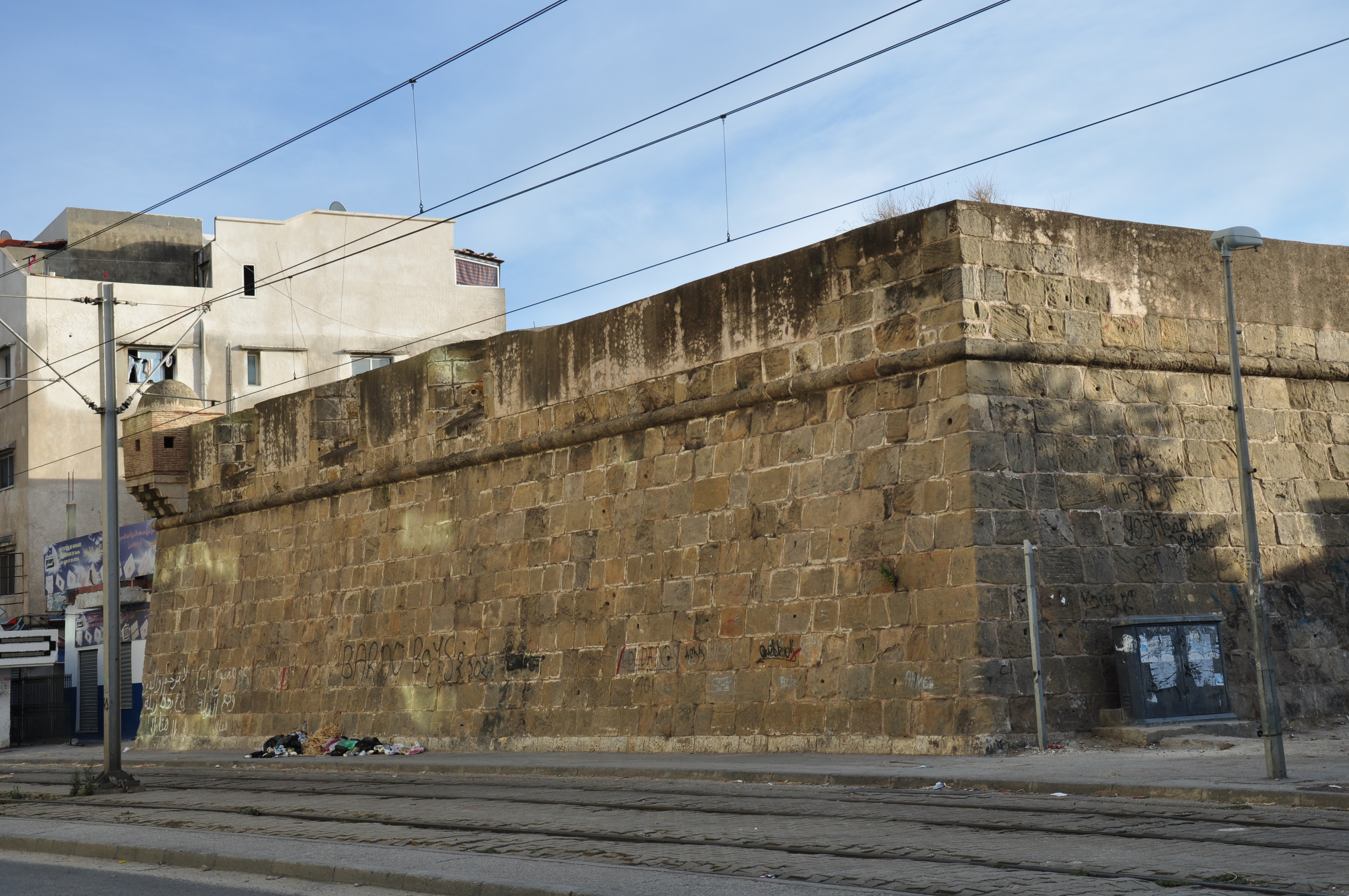
Borj Sidi Yahia

== History ==
According to the commemorative plaque at the entrance, it was built with a madrasa during the Hafsid era in the 14th century. It was restored between 1973 and 1974.

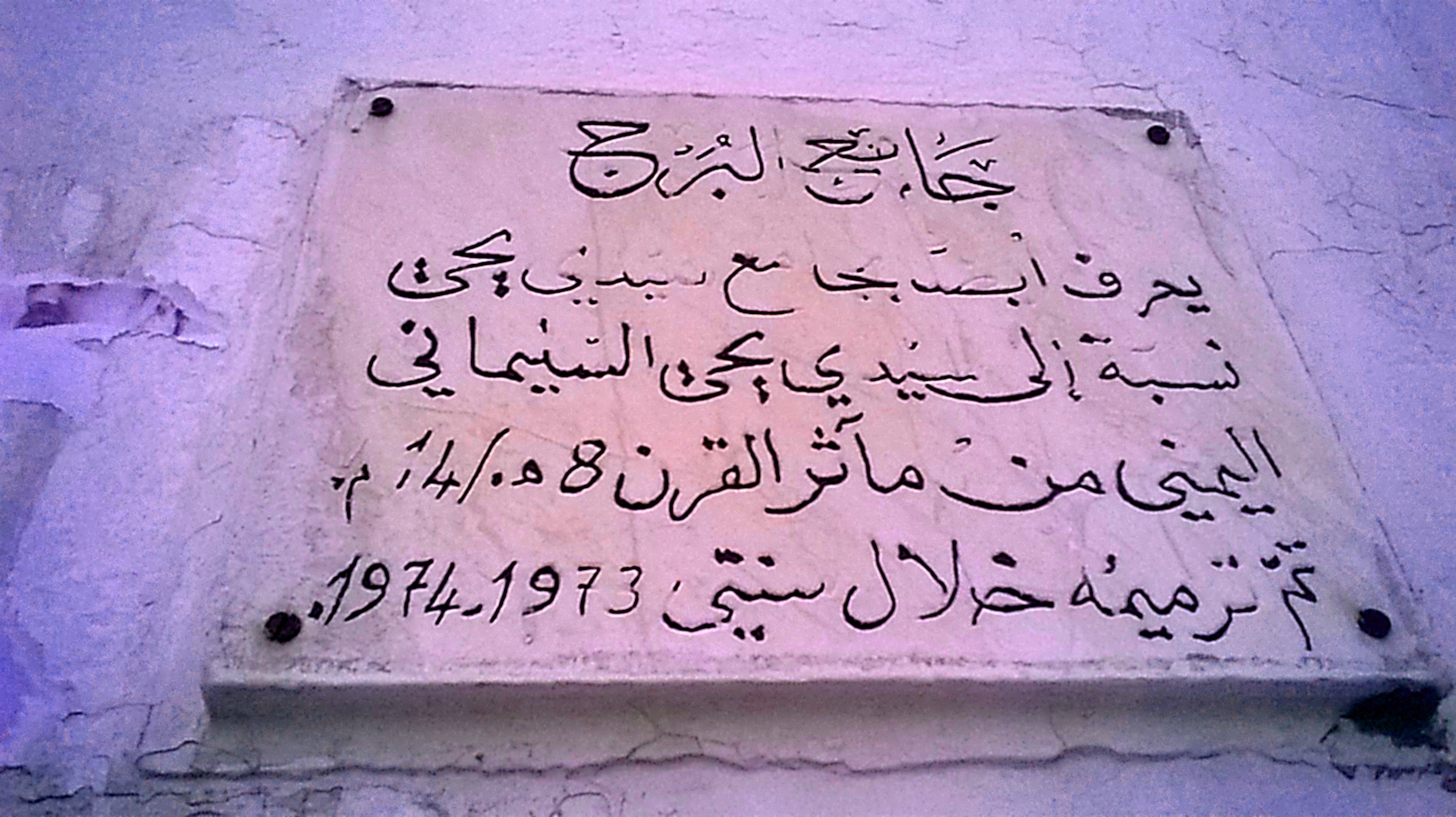
Commemorative plaque of the mosque

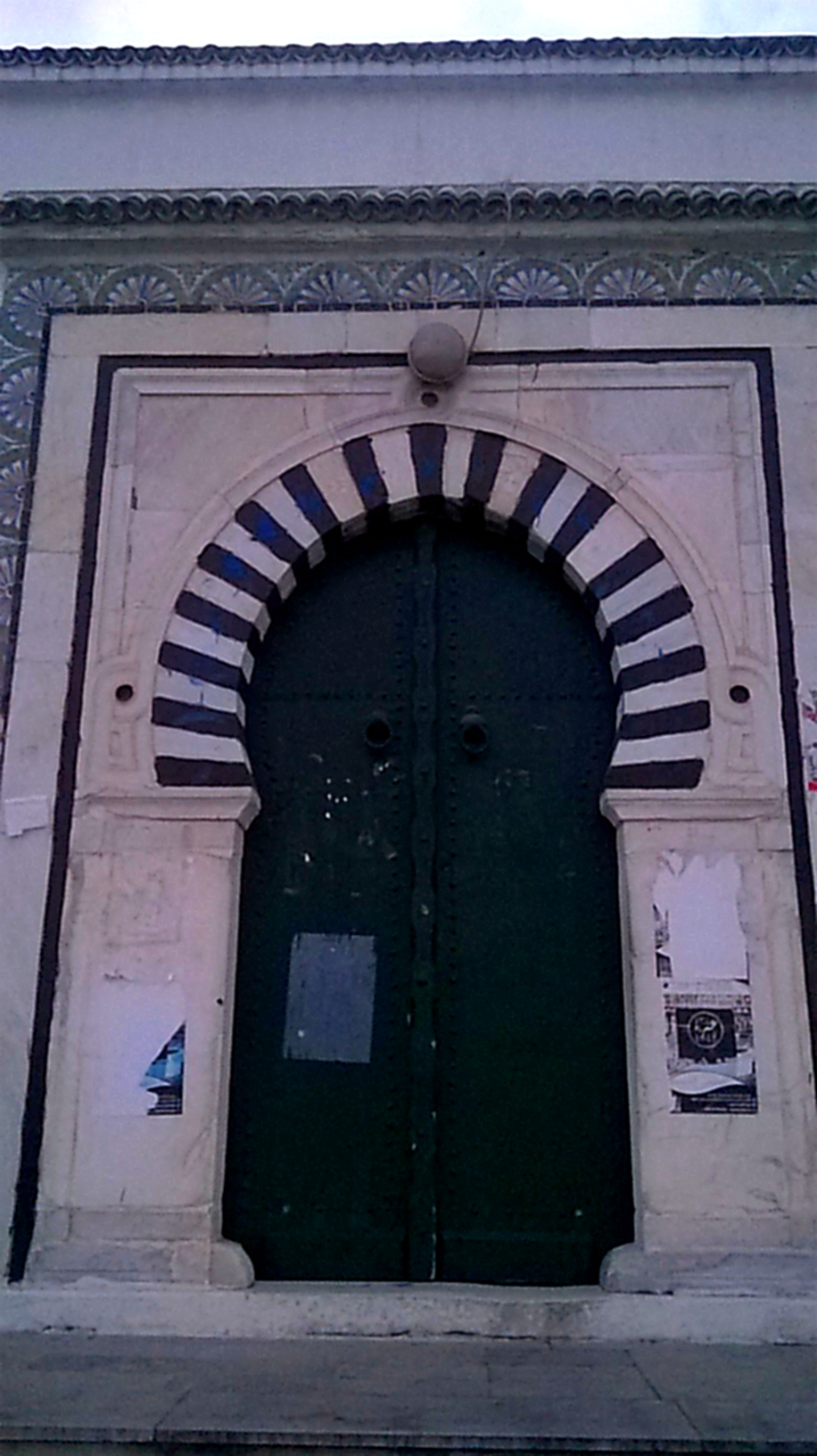
Main entrance

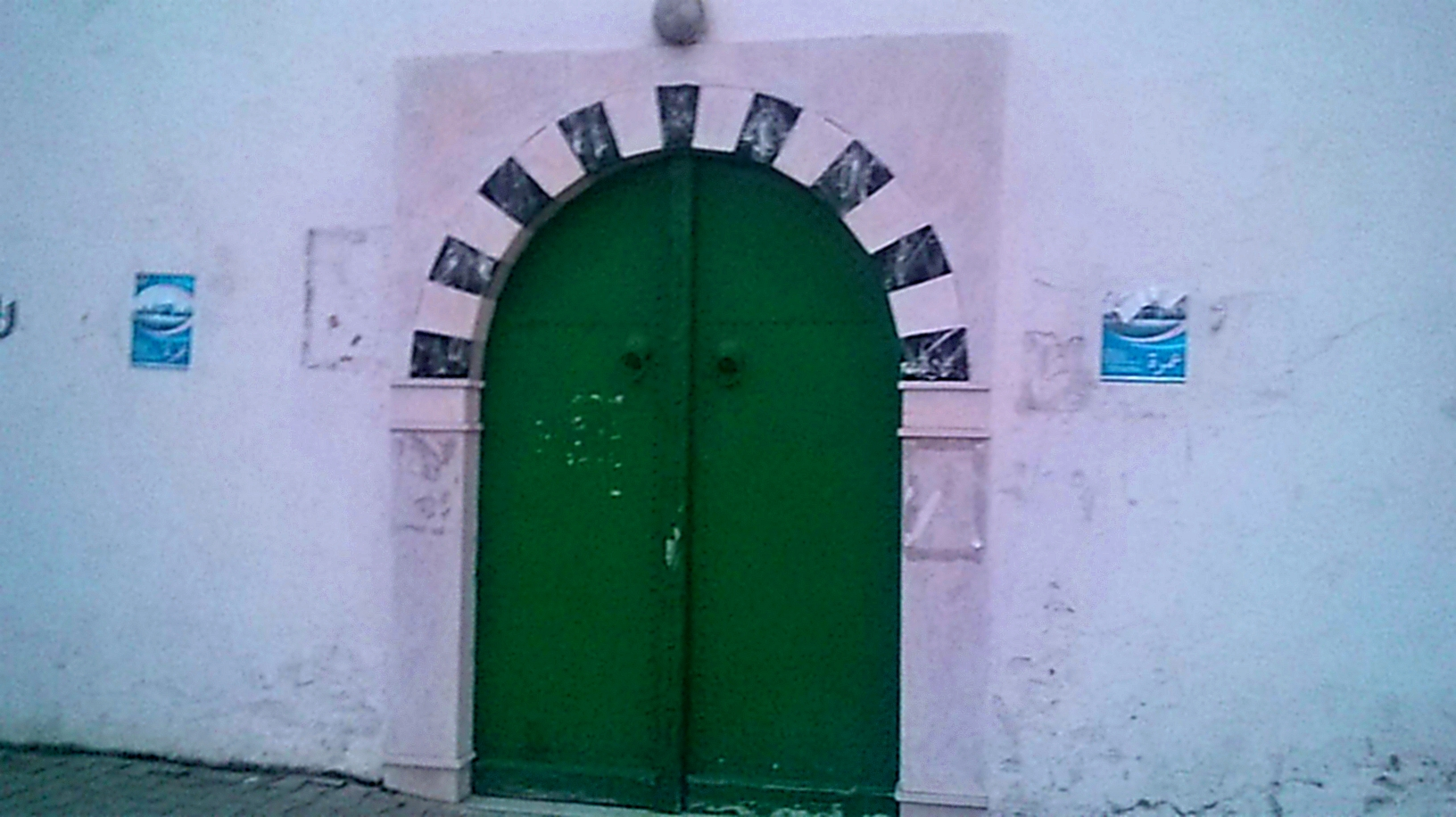
Side door

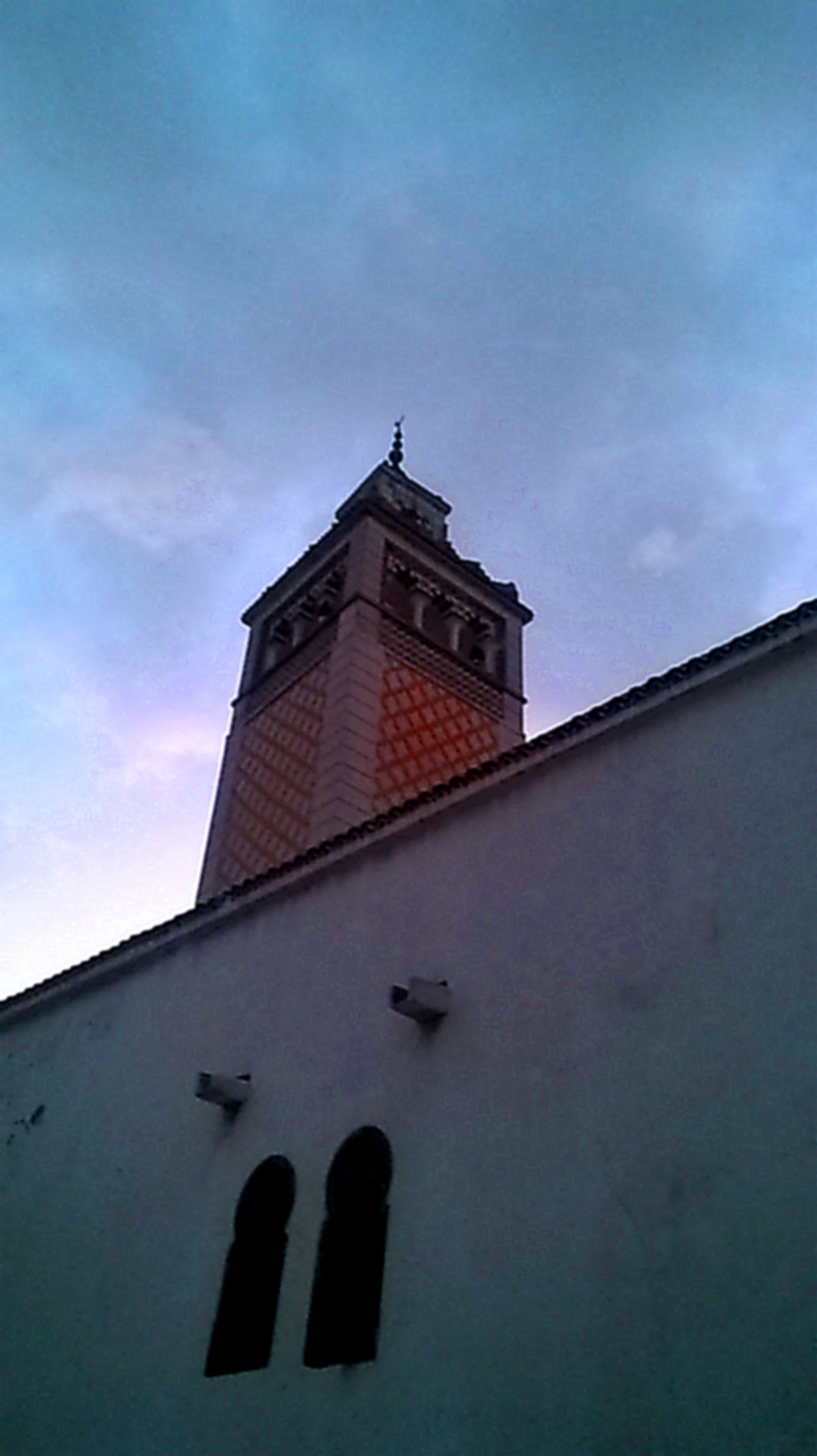
Minaret of the mosque
