= Bab Laassal =

- Arabic: باب العسل
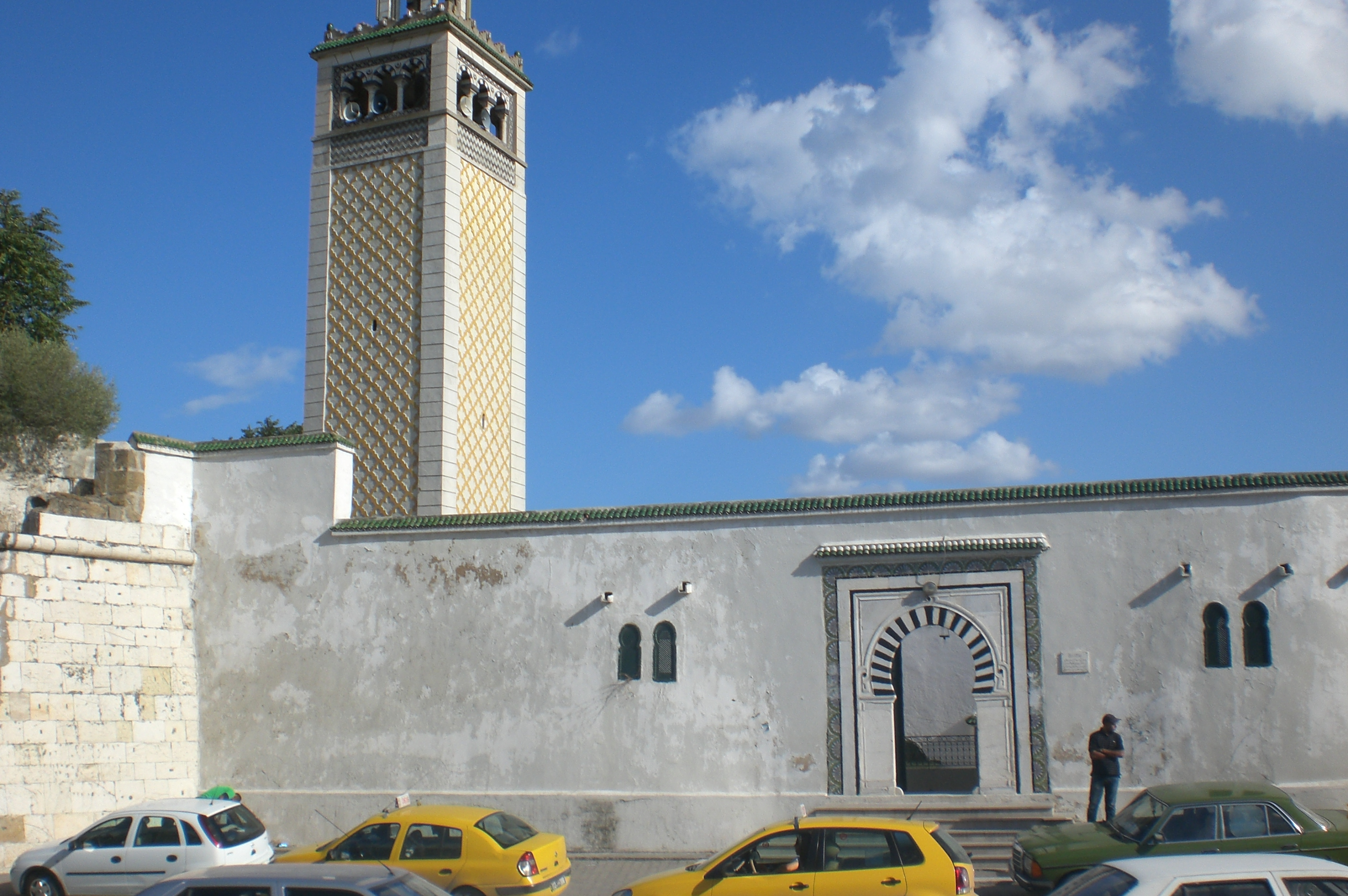
- View of El Borj Mosque
- Etymology: The Ben Assal family

General information
- Town or city: Tunis
- Country: Tunisia
- Coordinates: 36.81225°N 10.166917°E
- Completed: after 1881

Bab Laassal (Arabic: باب العسل), or Bab El'Assel, is one of the gates of the medina of Tunis.

It is near the El Borj Mosque, also known as the Sidi Yahia Mosque.
