= Hammam El Rmimi Mosque =

Mosque in Halfaouine, Tunisia

- جامع حمام الرميمي
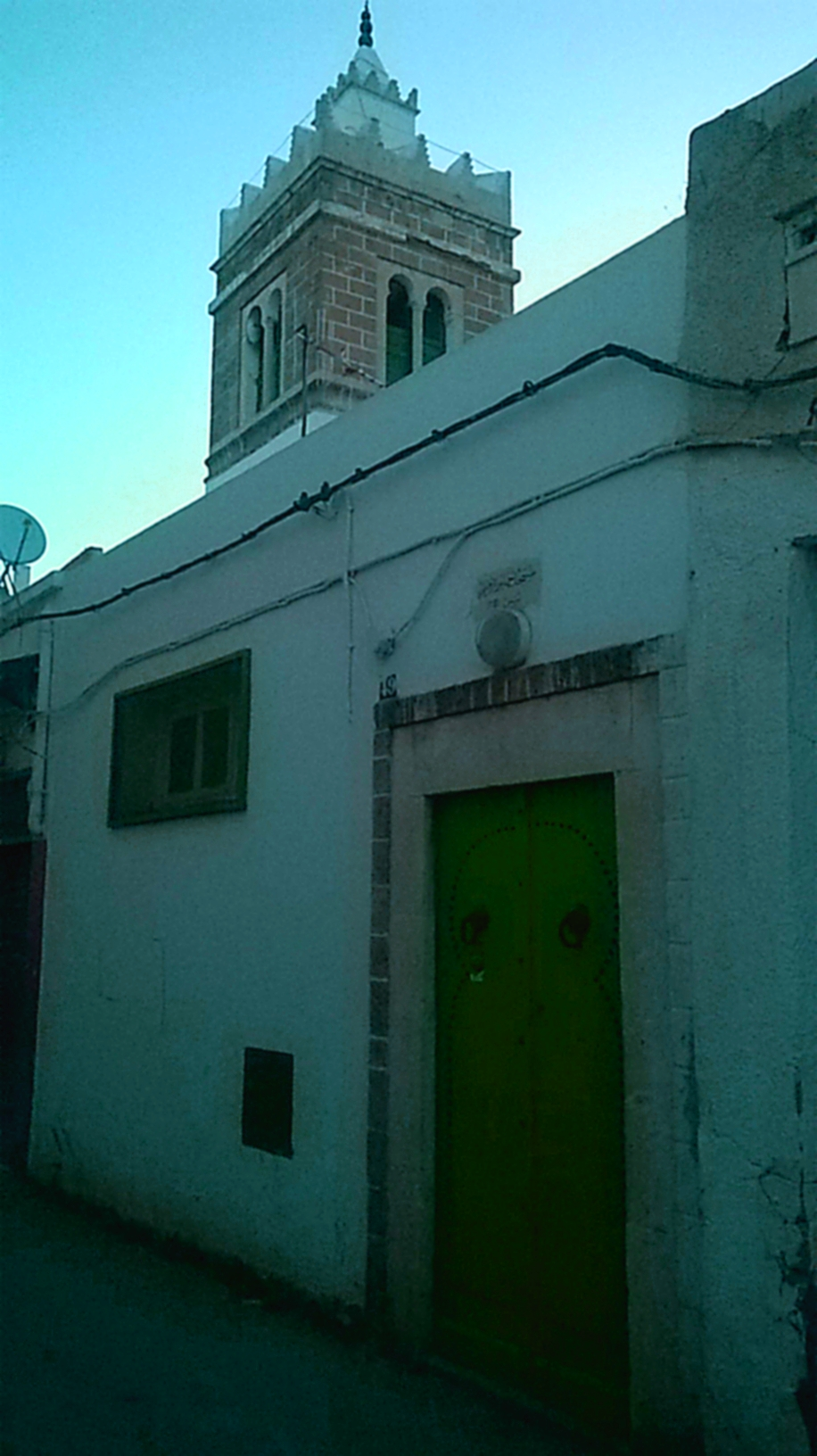

- Location within Tunisia

Religion
- Affiliation: Islam
- Branch/tradition: Sunni

Location
- Location: Tunis, Tunisia
- Interactive map of Hammam El Rmimi Mosque
- Coordinates: 36.807728888889°N 10.170230555556°E

Architecture
- Type: Masjid

Hammam Remimi Mosque (Arabic: جامع حمام الرميمي) is a Tunisian Masjid in the Halfaouine hood in the north of the Medina of Tunis.

== History ==
According to the commemorative plaque at the entrance, it was built in 1781 during the Husainid era.

== Etymology ==
The mosque got its name from a hammam near to it that was founded in 1245 by Mohamed Remimi (Arabic: محمد الرميمي) who came from Almería during the Hafsid era.

== Localization ==
It can be found in the Hammam Remimi Street, between two gates of the medina: Bab Souika and Bab El Khadra.

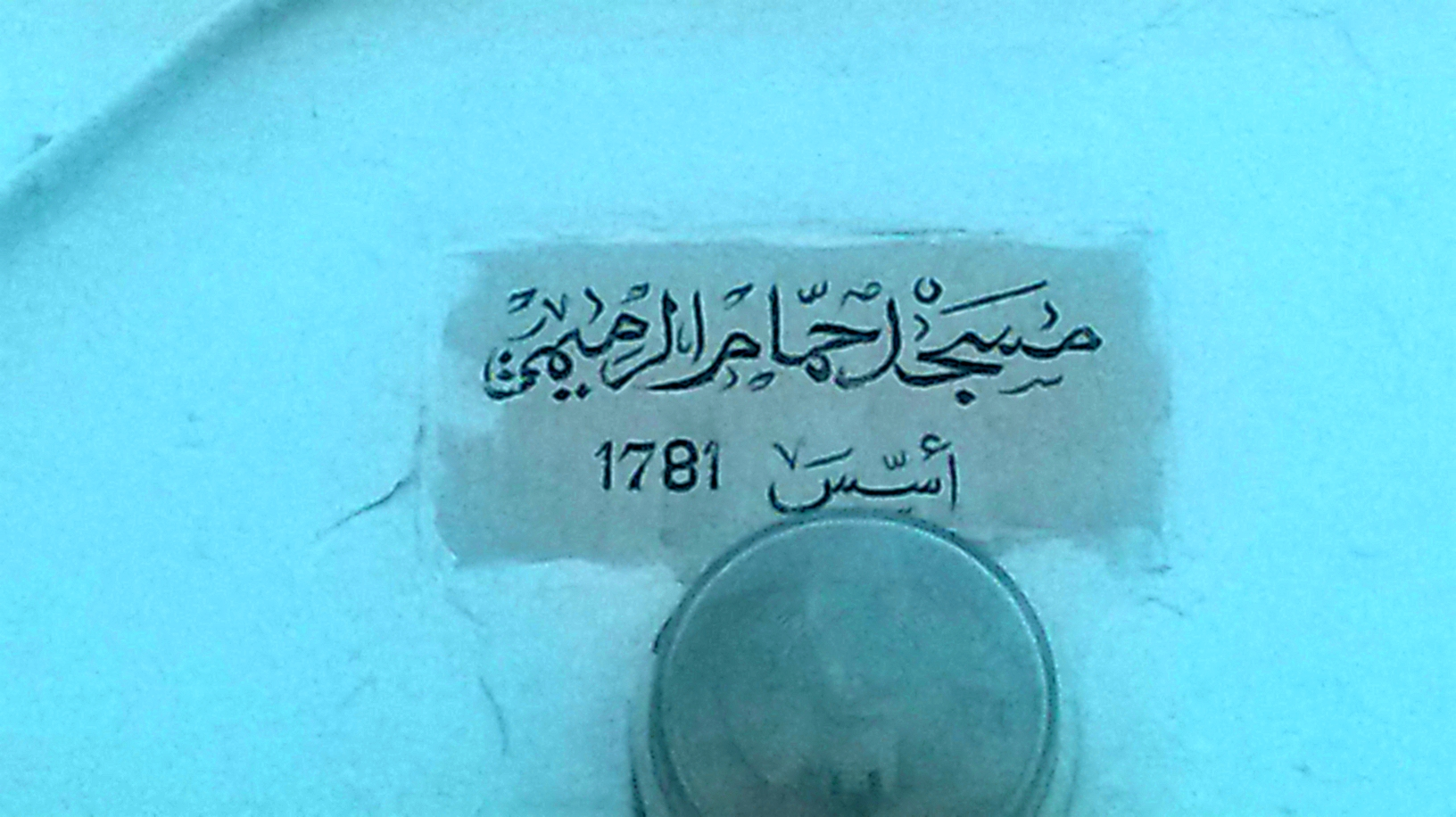
Commemorative plaque of the mosque

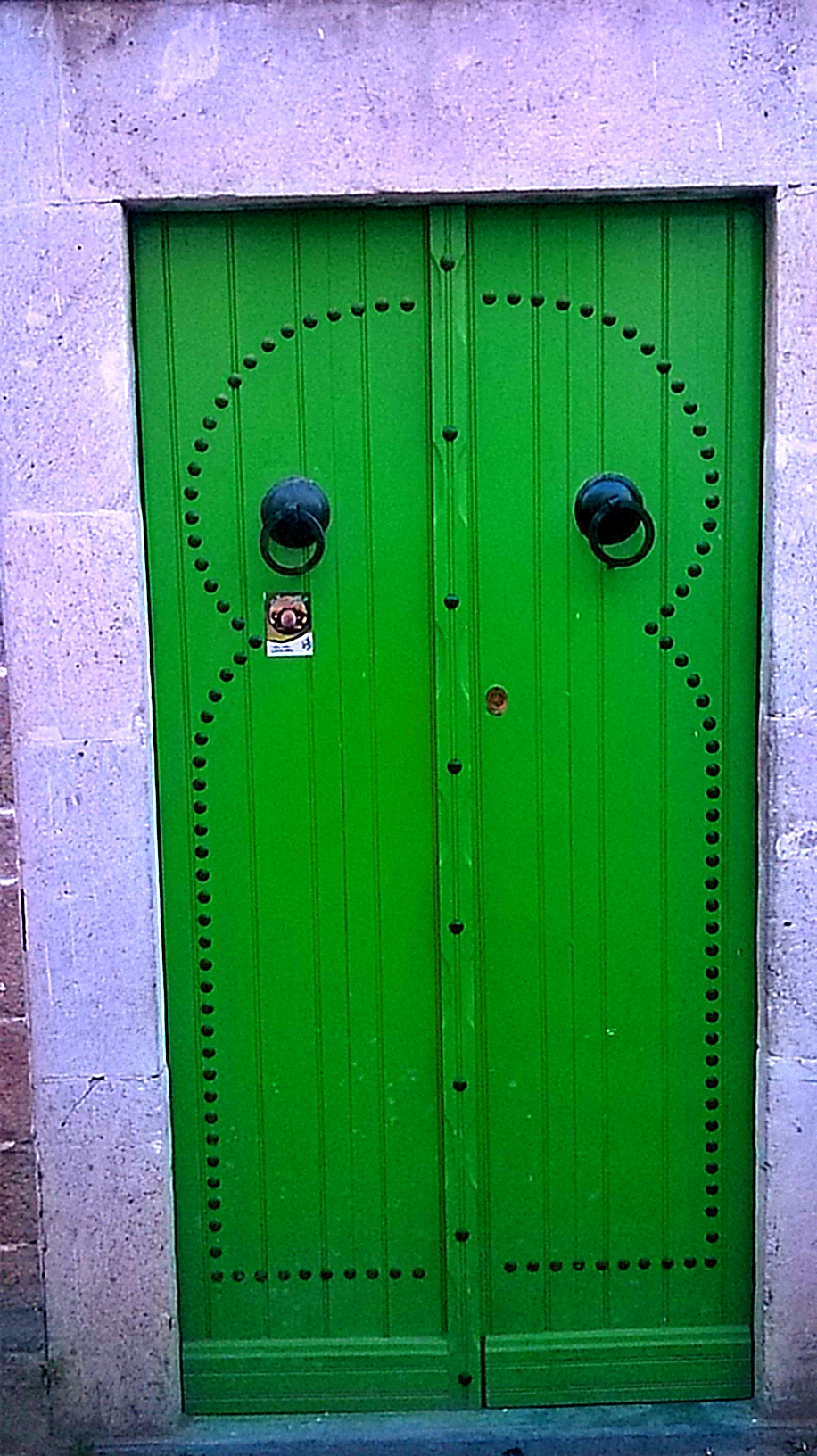
Entrance of the mosque

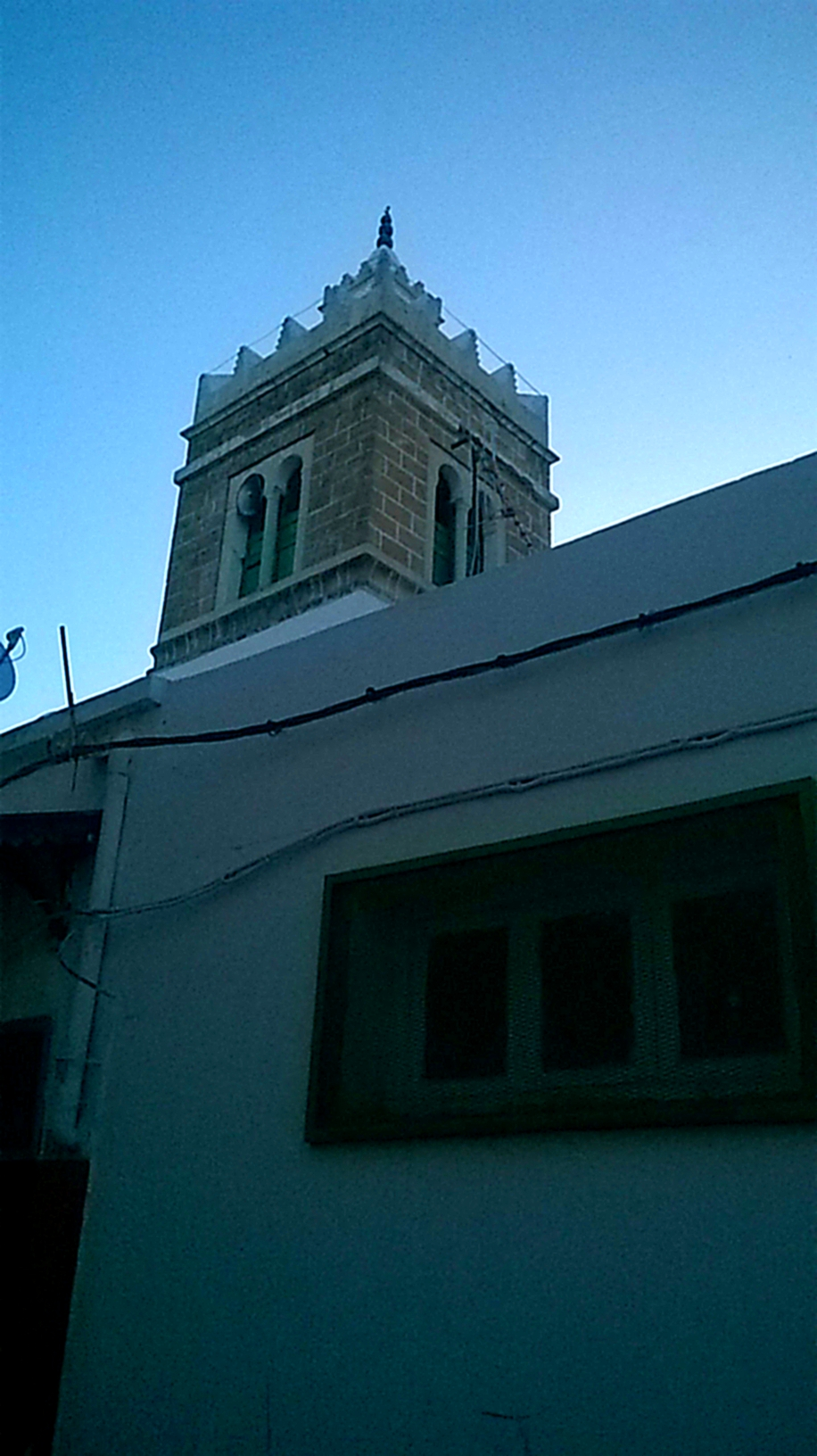
Minaret of the mosque
