= Palaces of Tunis =

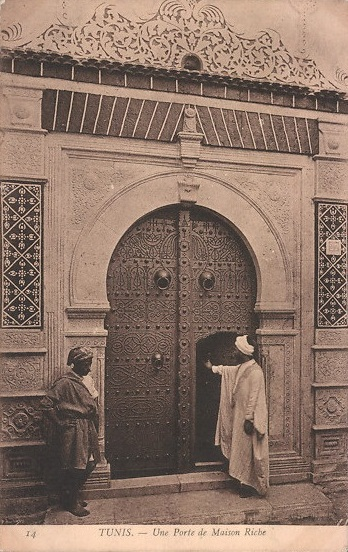
One of the palaces of Tunis, Dar Balma

The palaces of Tunis are considered as a historical monuments in the medina of Tunis, Tunis. Palaces in Tunis include:

- Dar Al Jaziri
- Dar Bach Hamba
- Dar Balma
- Dar Bayram
- Dar Belhouane
- Dar Ben Abdallah
- Dar Ben Achour
- Dar Ben Ayed
- Dar Bou Hachem
- Dar Caïd Nessim Samama
- Dar Daouletli
- Dar Djaït
- Dar Djellouli
- Dar El Bey
- Dar El Cherif
- Dar El Haddad
- Dar El Monastiri
- Dar Ibn Abi Dhiaf
- Dar Hammuda Pasha
- Dar Hussein
- Dar Lasram
- Dar Othman
- Dar Zarrouk
- Gnecco Palace
- Hayreddin Palace
- Khaznadar Palace
- Saheb Ettabaâ Palace
- Dar Jouini

== Gallery ==
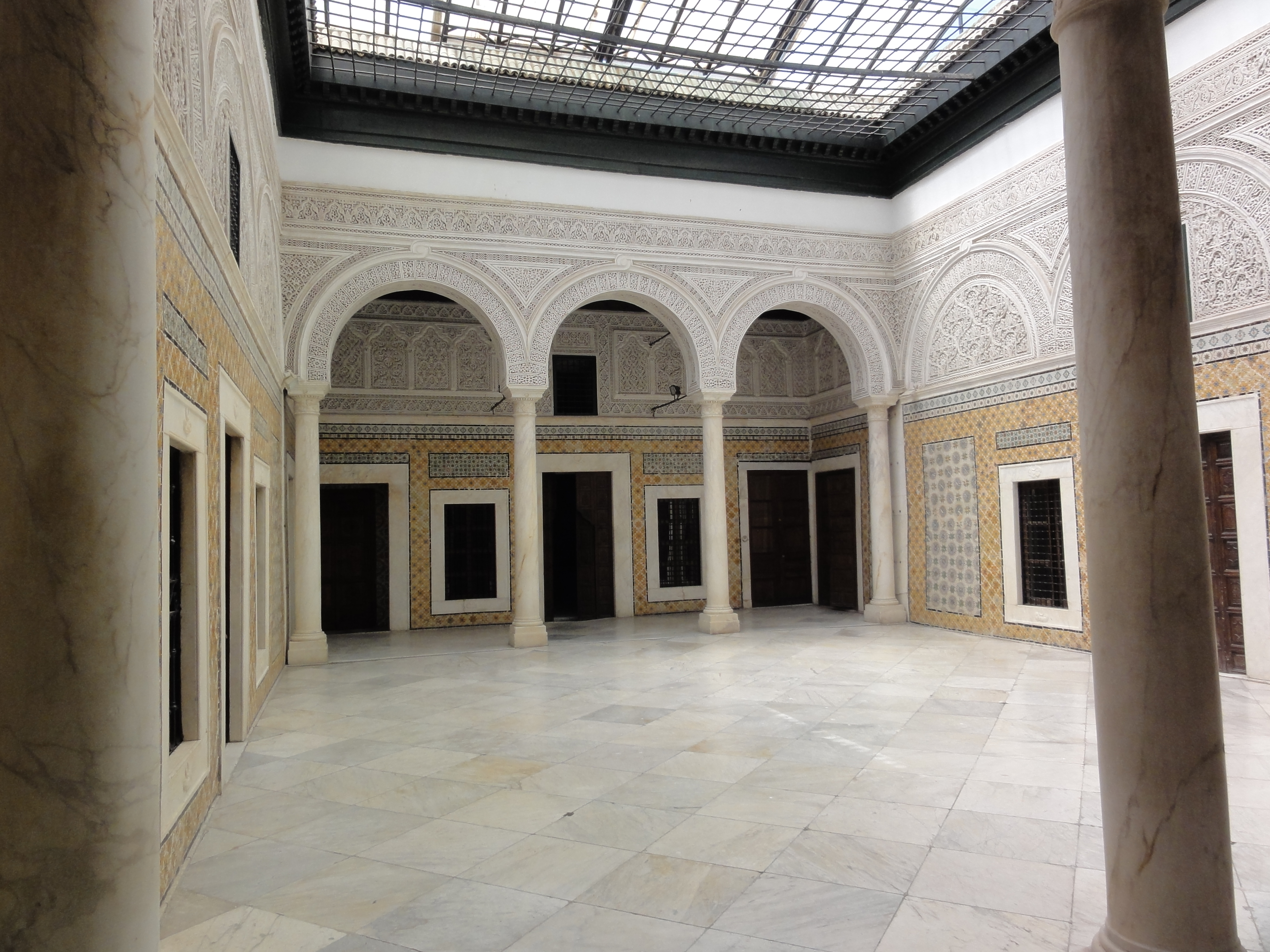
Dar Lasram

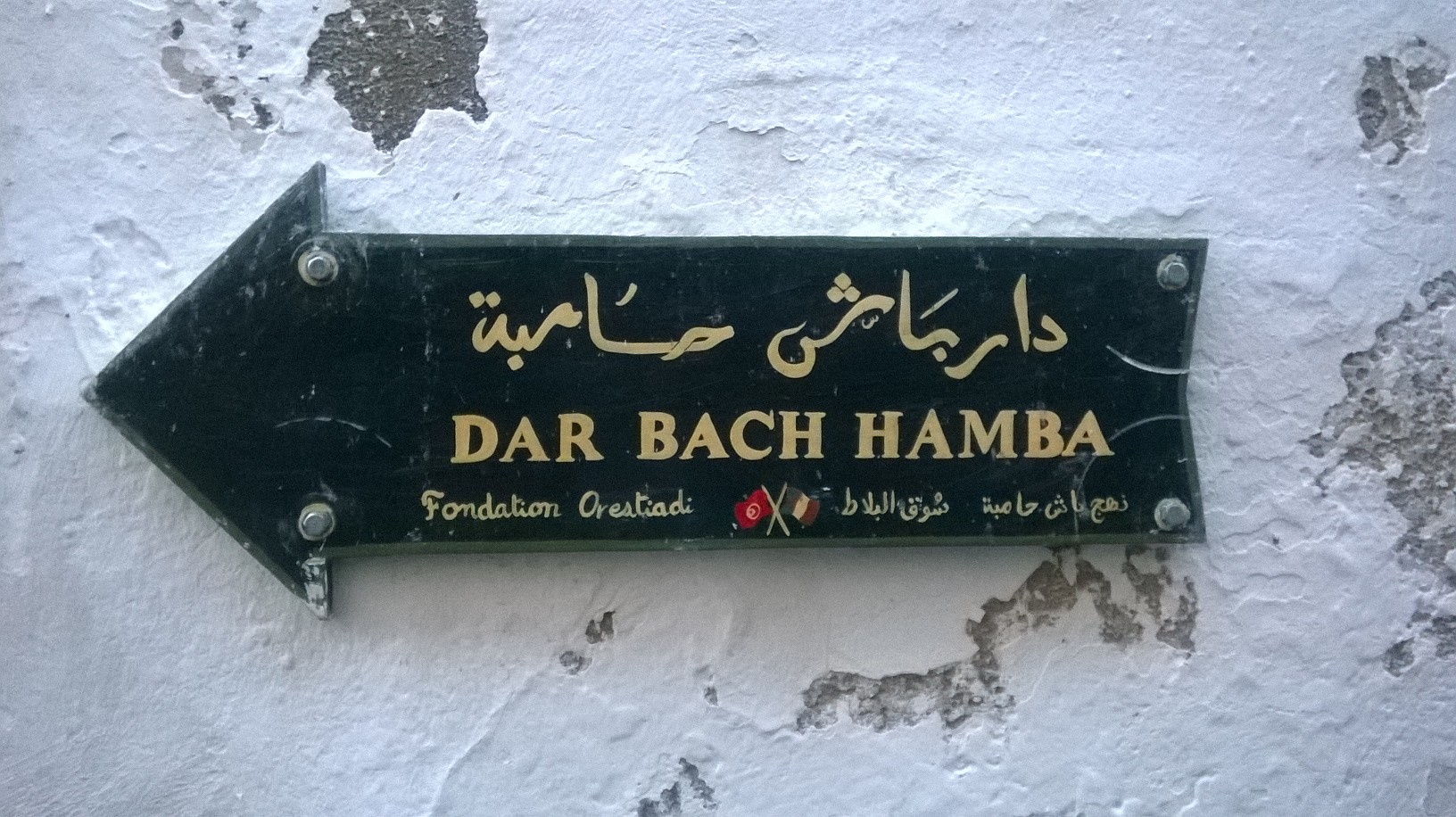
Dar Bach Hamda

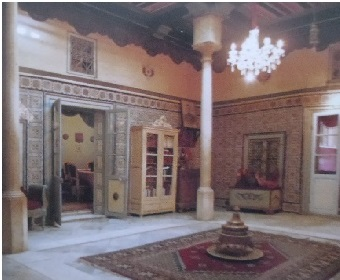
Dar Djellouli

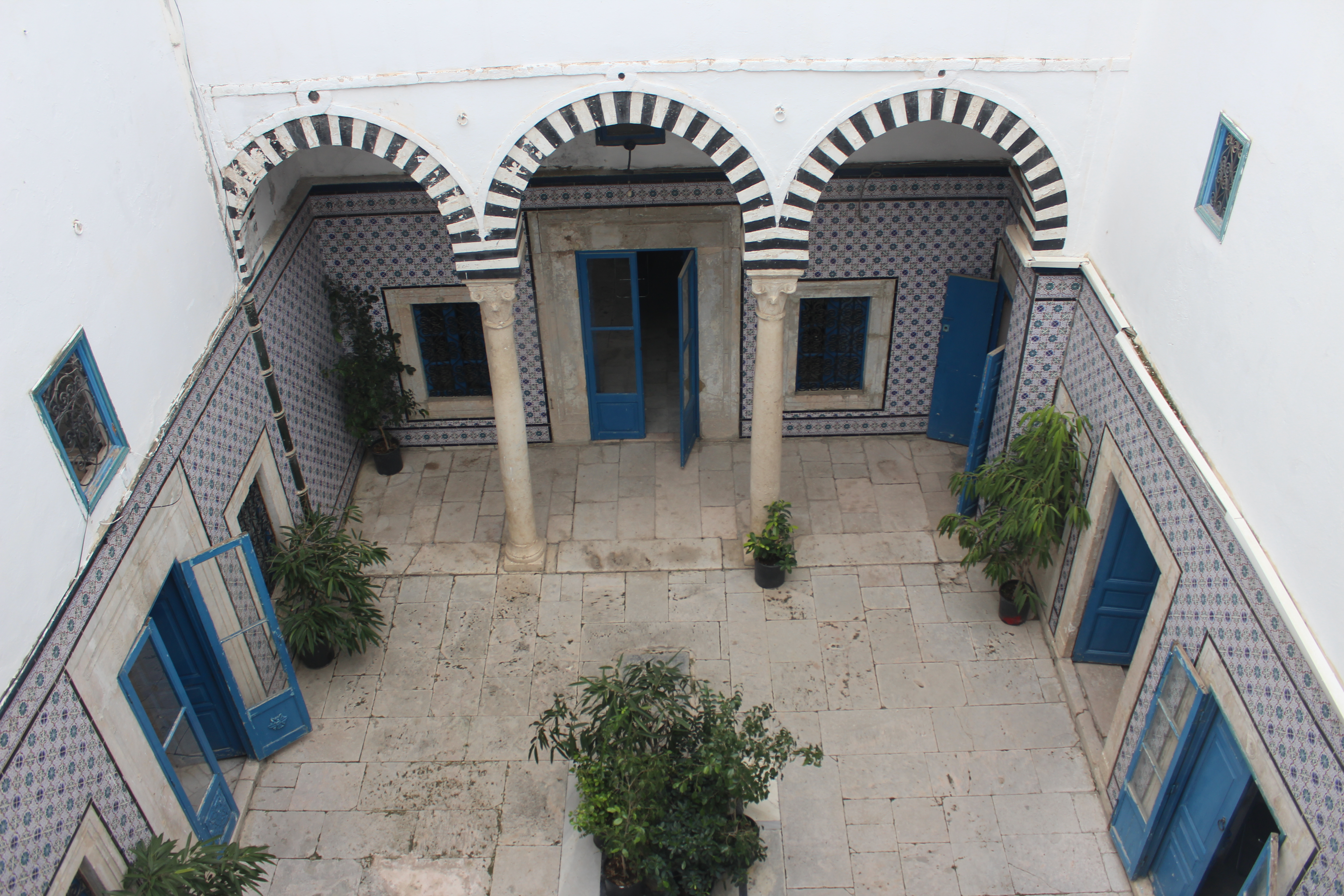
Dar Ben Achour

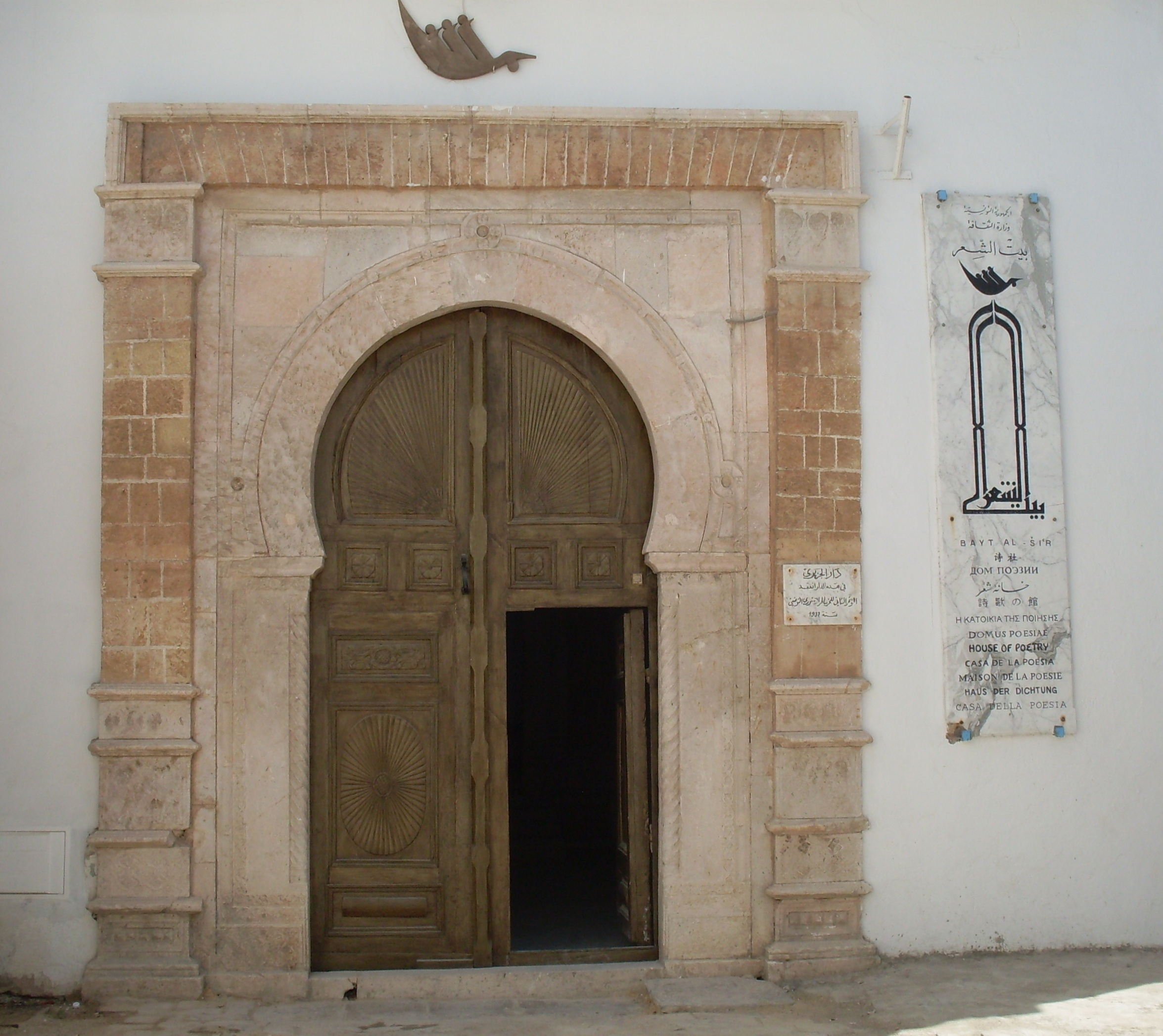
Dar Al Jaziri
