= Dar El Cherif =

Palace in Tunis

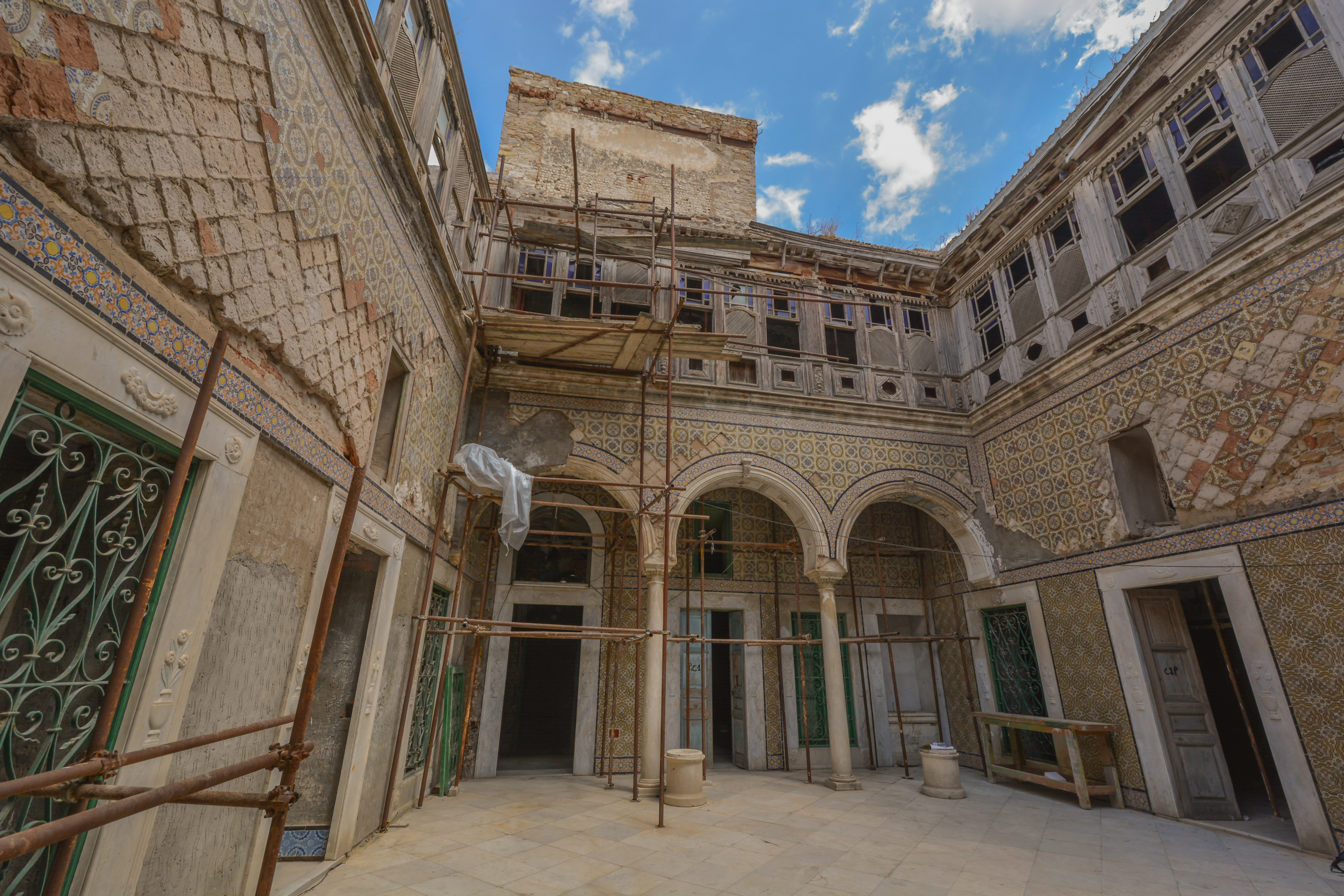
- Restoration work at The Courtyard of Dar El Cherif

General information
- Type: Palace
- Architectural style: Moorish; Tunisian; Italian
- Location: Medina of Tunis, Tunis, Tunisia
- Year built: 19th Century
- Client: El Cherif Family

Dar El Cherif is an old palace in the Medina of Tunis. It is located in Sidi Maaouia Street, near El Monastiri and Achour Streets.

The palace was built in the middle of the 19th century. It is known for its Ottoman inspired and Italian facade.

== Gallery ==
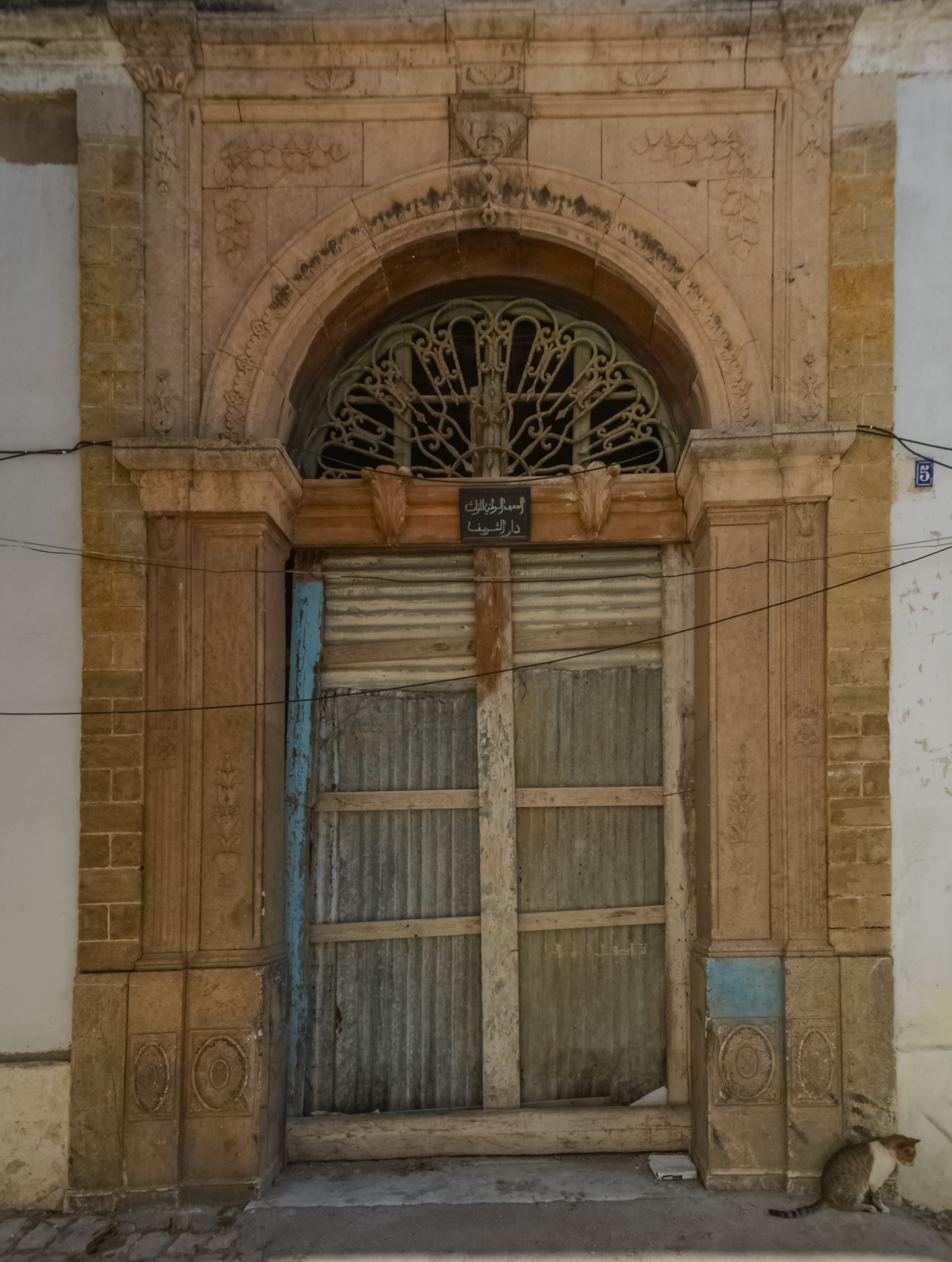
Entrance of Dar El Cherif

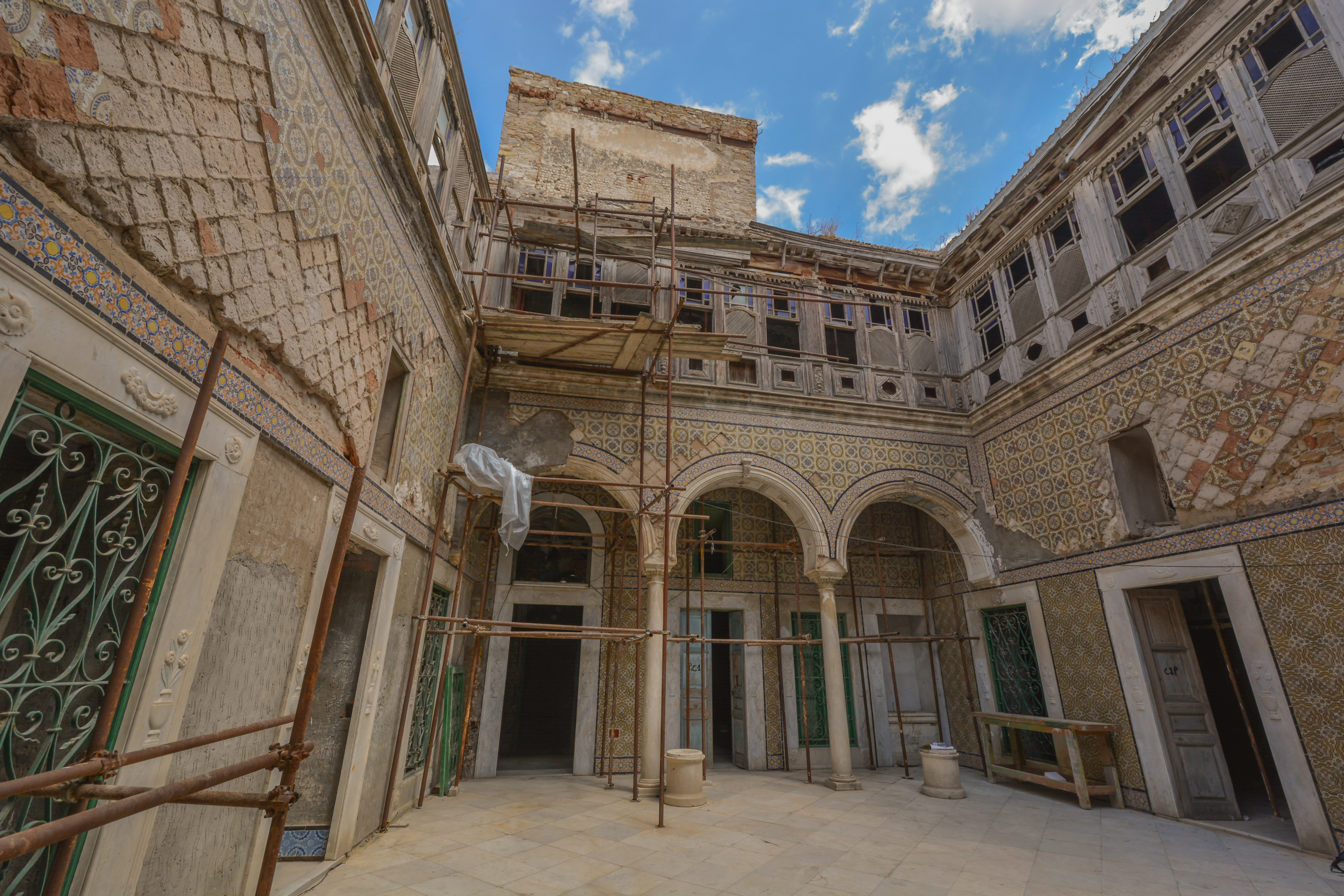
Hall of Dar El Cherif

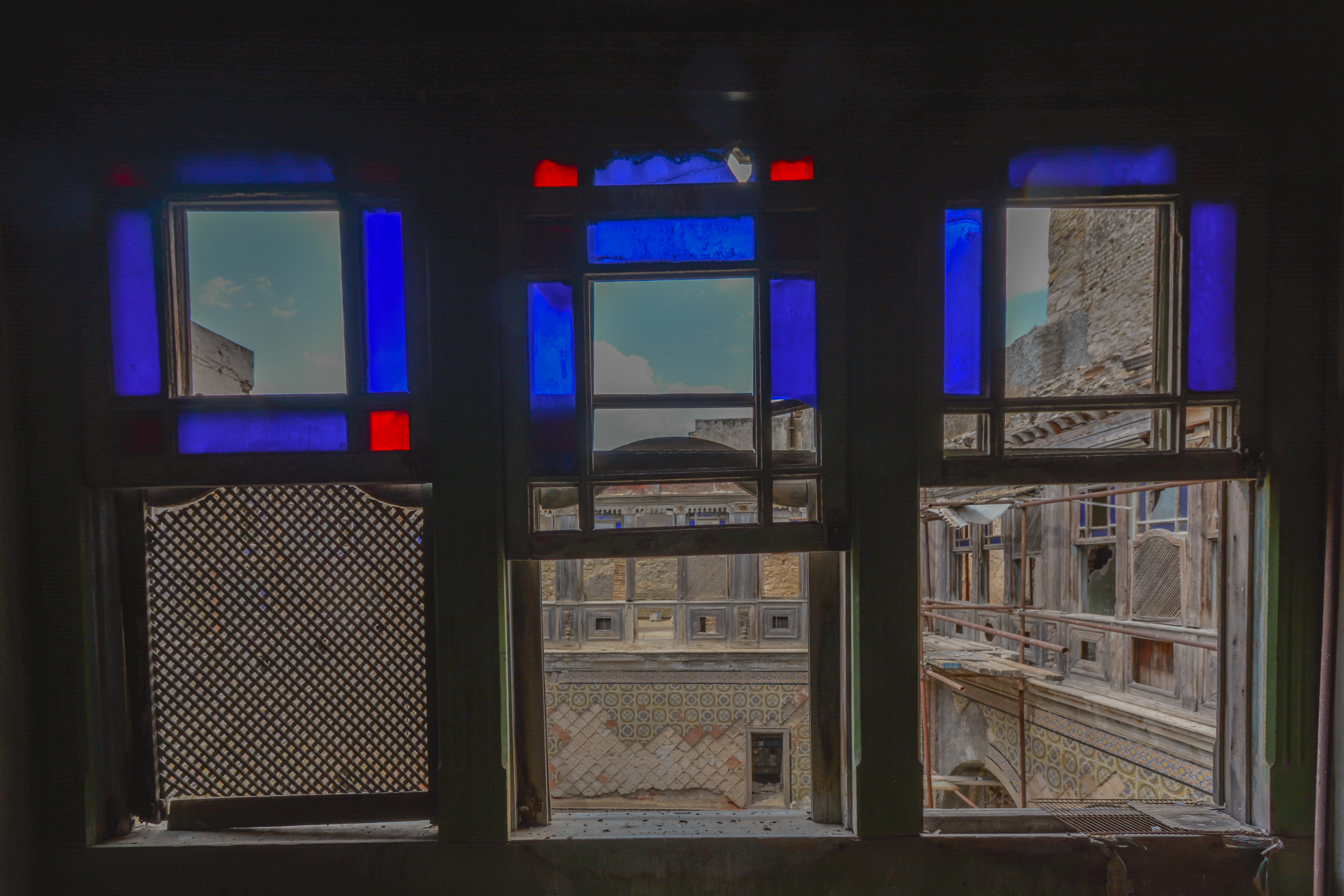
Balcony

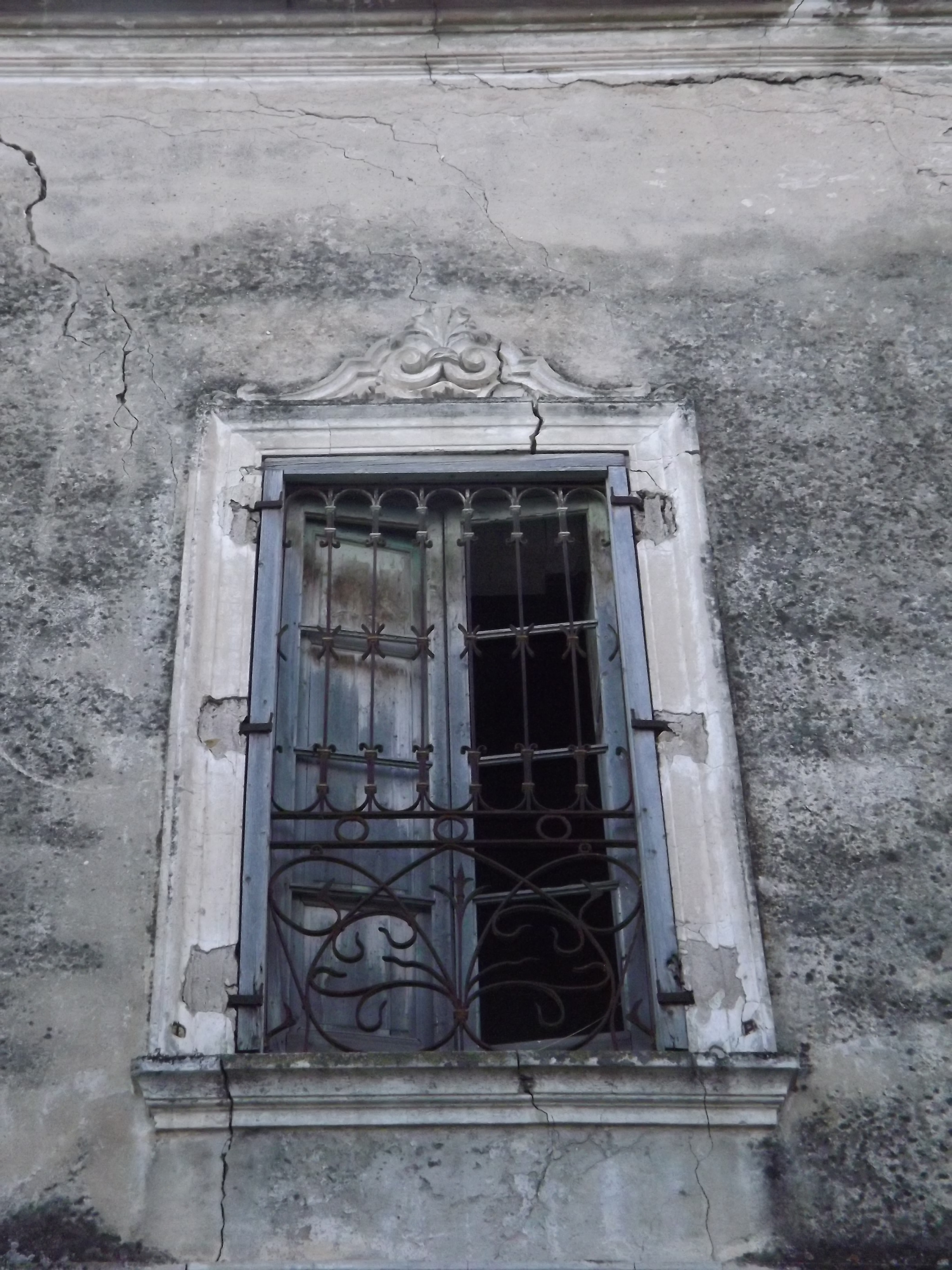
Italian window

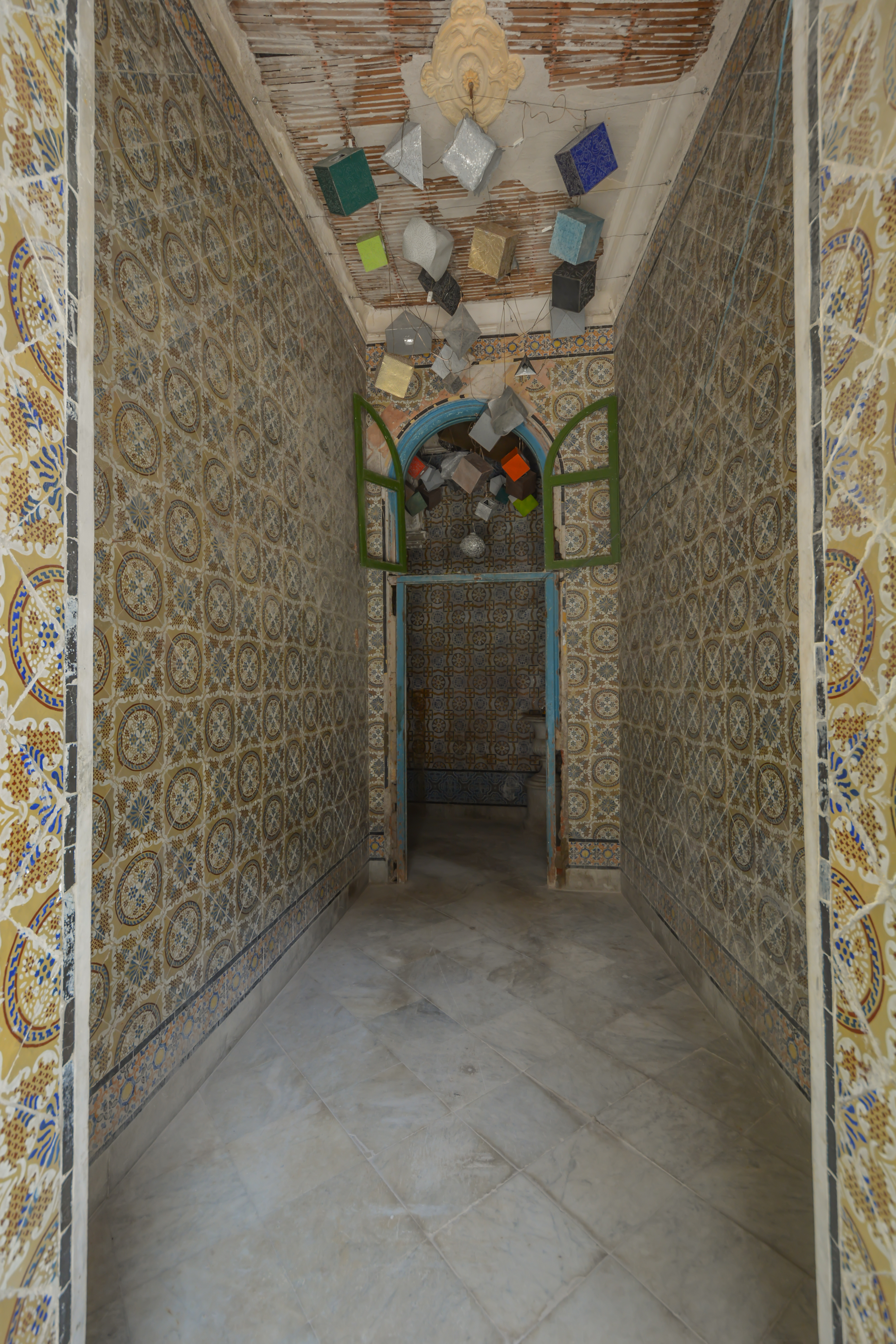
A corridor

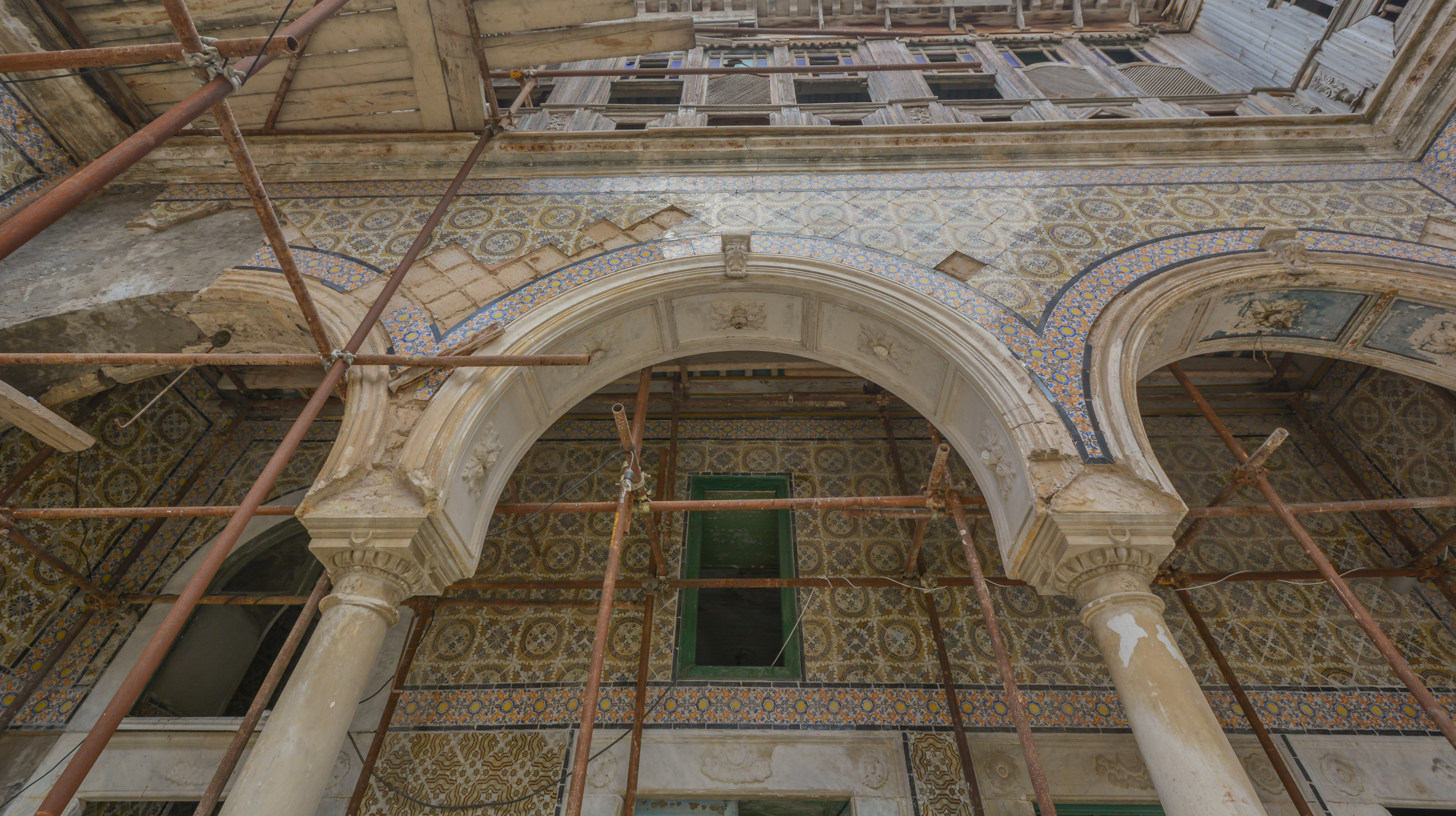
Arches of the hall

== See also ==
- Media related to Category:Dar Echerif at Wikimedia Commons
