= Dar Belhouane =

Palace in the medina of Tunis

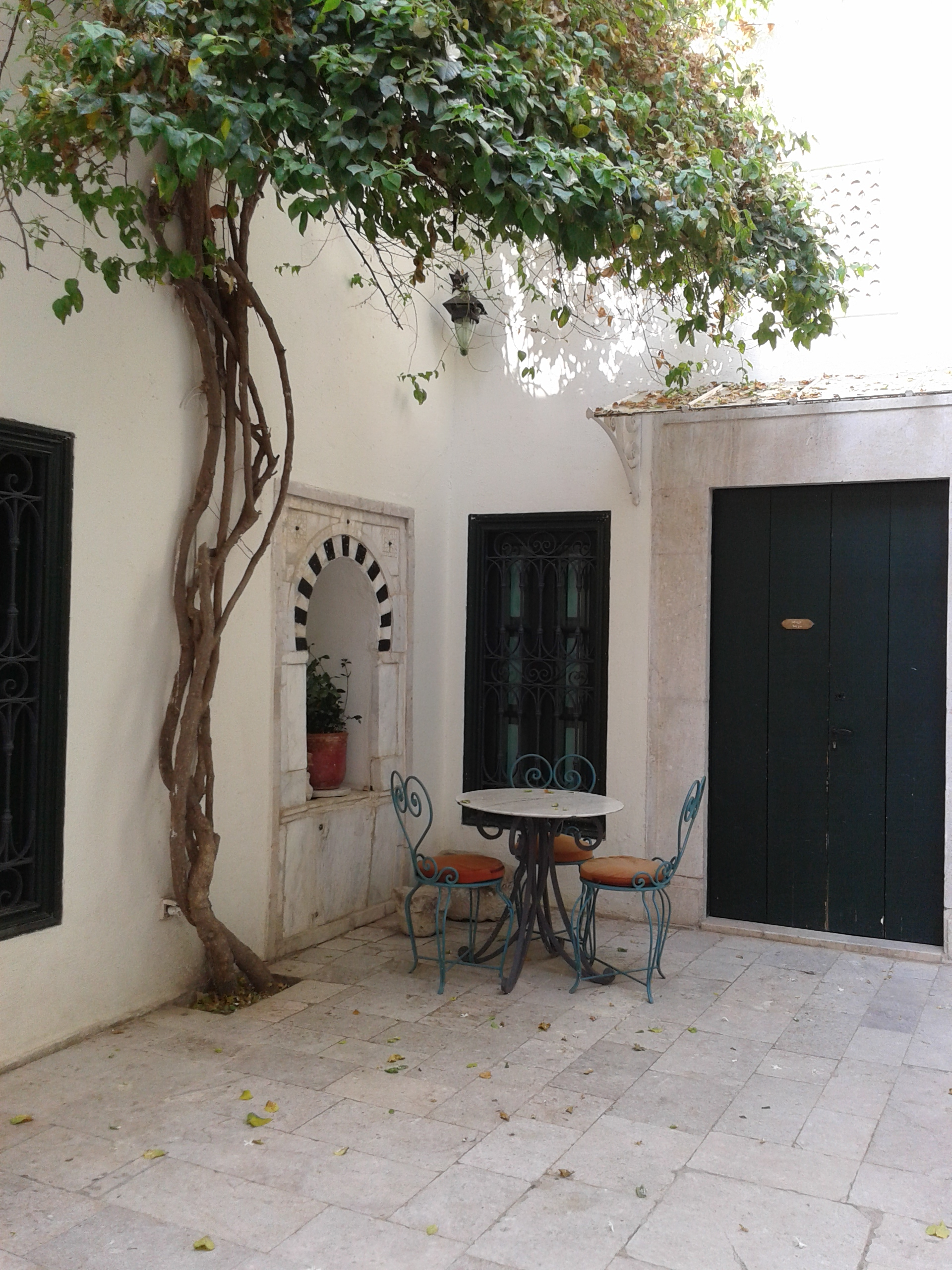
Patio of the current guest house.

Dar Belhouane is a palace in the medina of Tunis, located at 64 Sidi Ben Arous Street. Today, it operates as a guest house.

== History ==
One of the members of the Belhouane family served as a dey during the Ottoman period in the 17th century. This palace has since been transformed into a guest house which opened in 2005. The current hotel has twelve bedrooms.

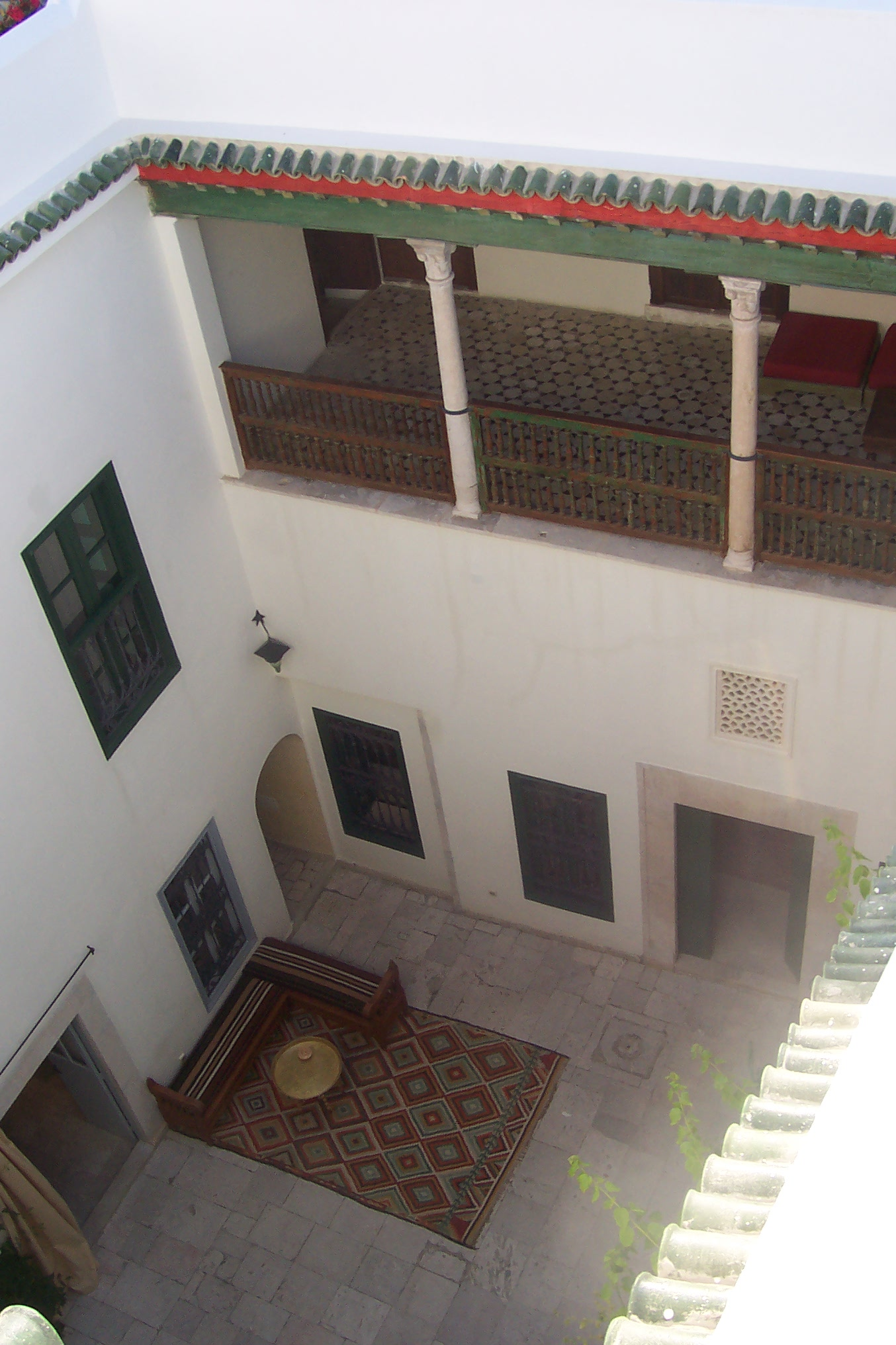
The hall

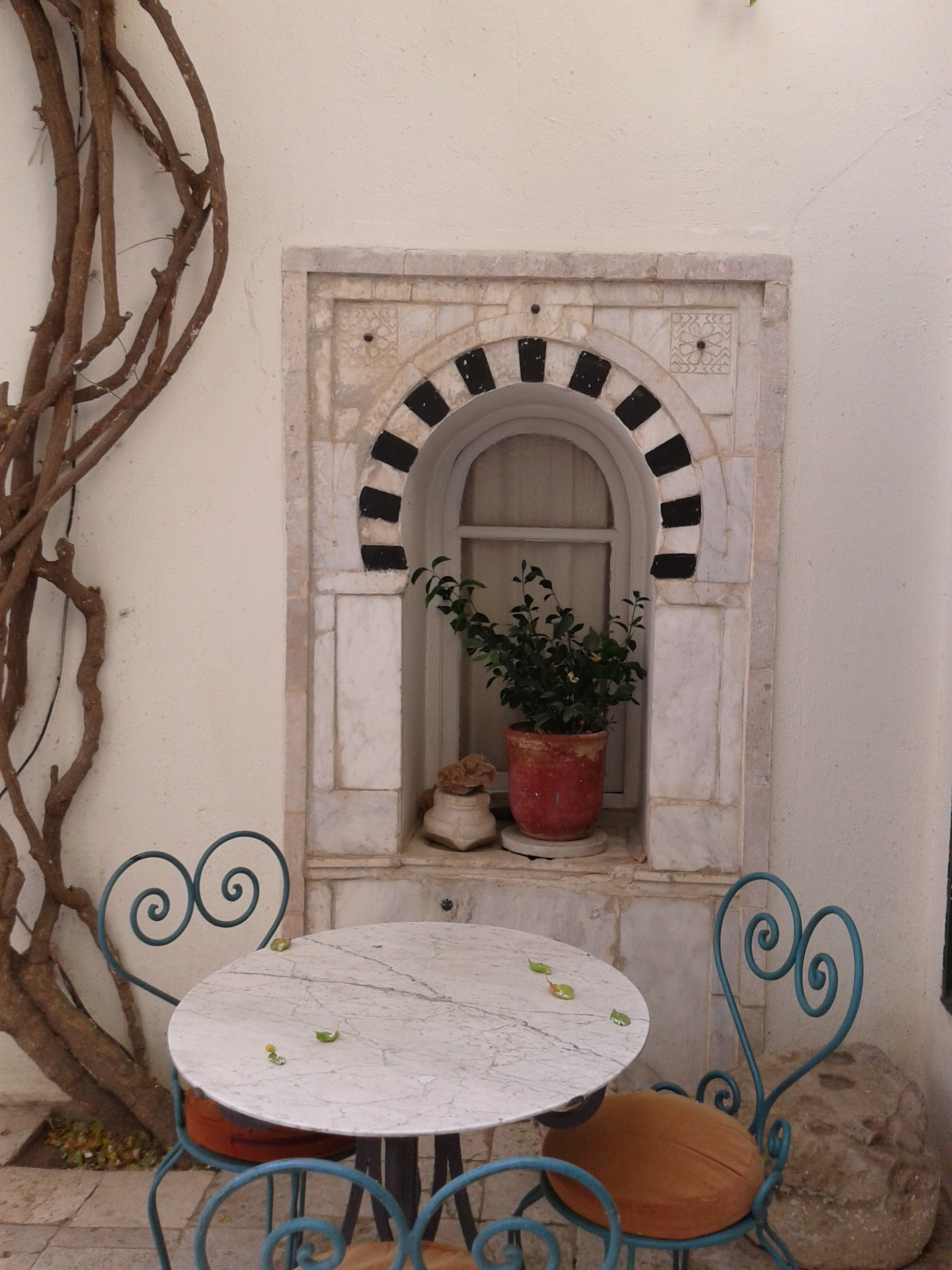
A table in the hall

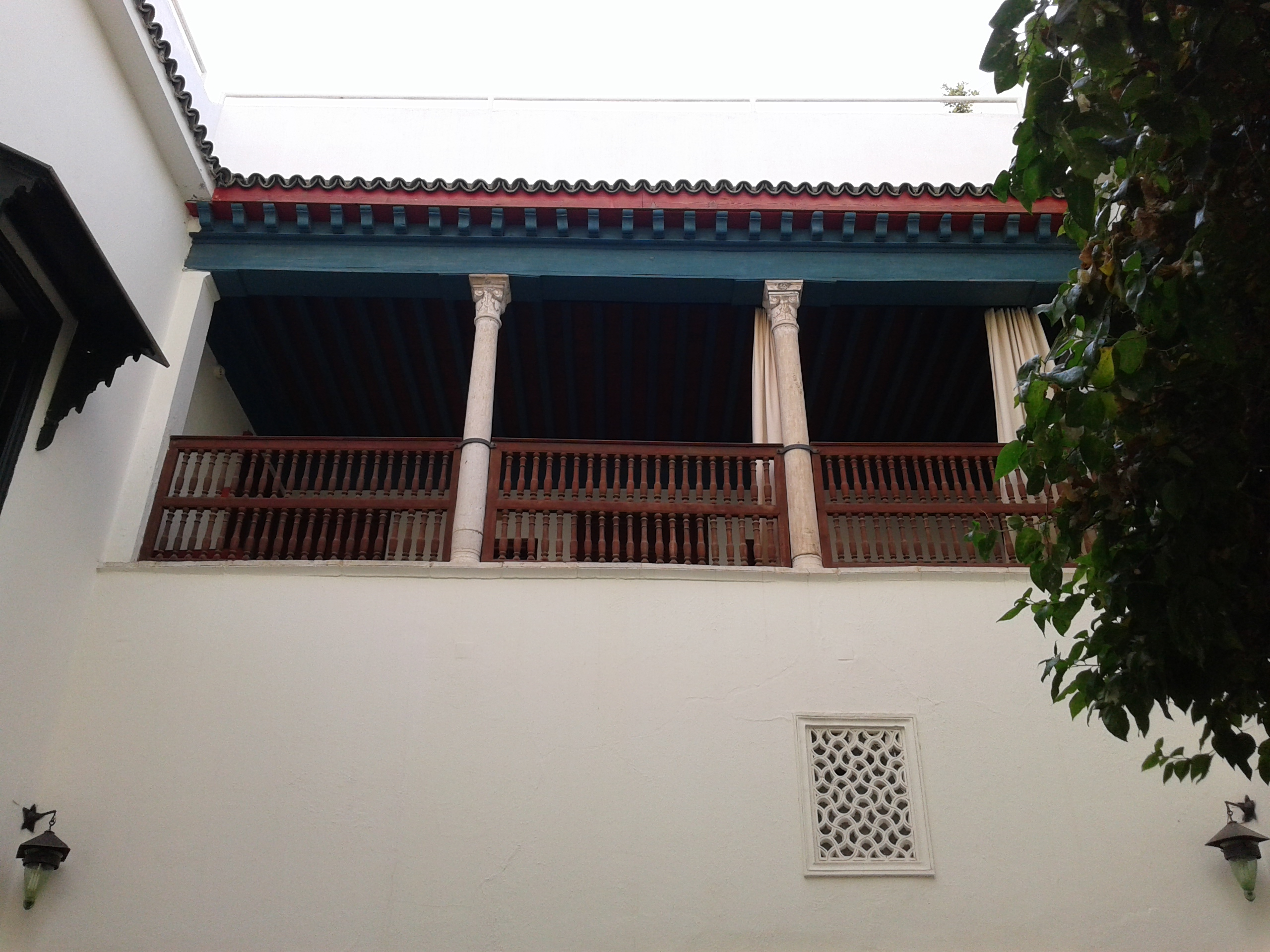
The balcony
