= Dar Bou Hachem =

Dar Bouhachem
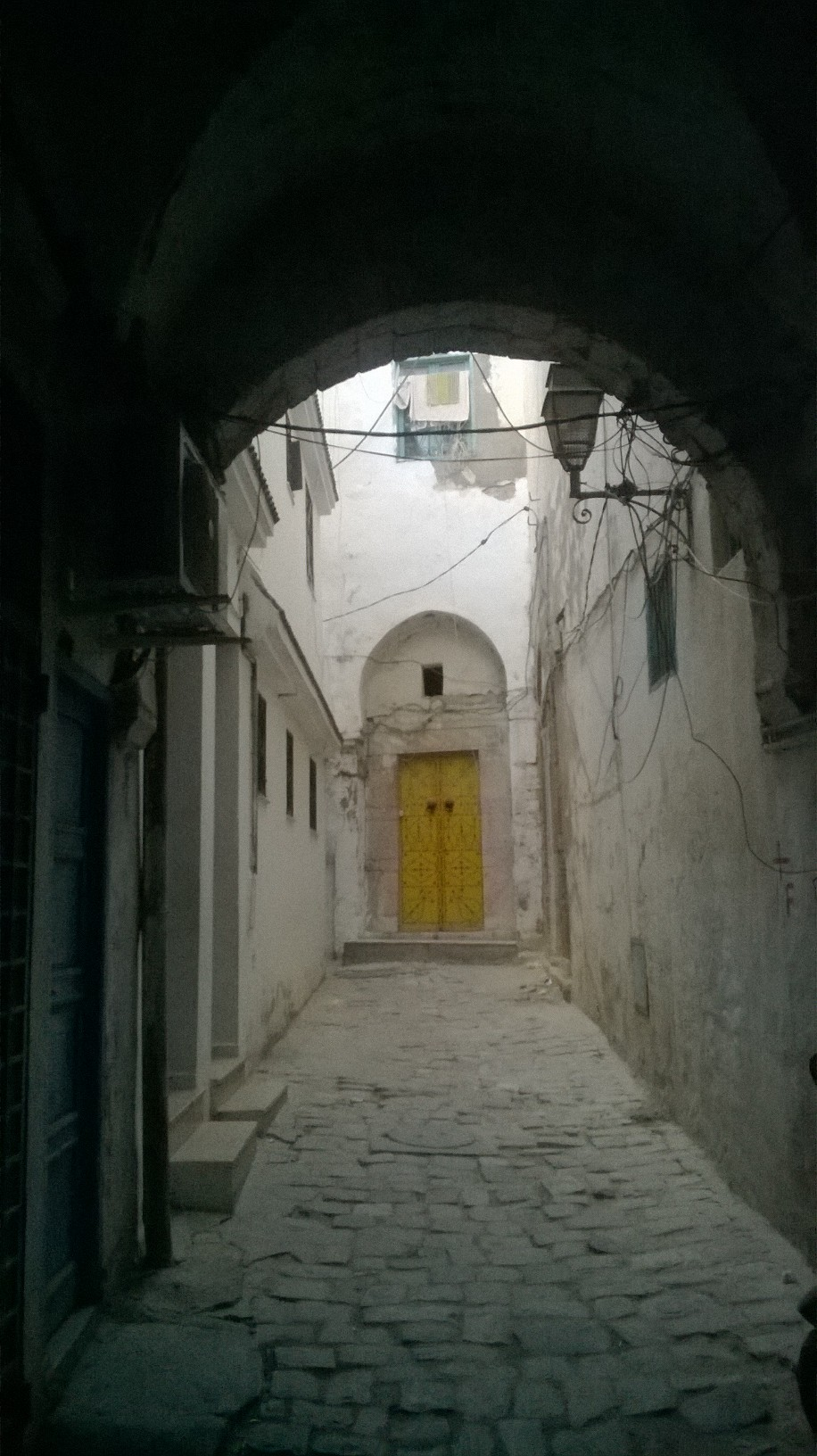
- View of Dar Bou Hachem
- Interactive map of the Dar Bouhachem area

General information
- Type: Palace
- Architectural style: Moorish; Tunisian; Ottoman
- Location: Medina of Tunis, Tunis, Tunisia
- Year built: 19th Century
- Client: Bouhachem

Dar Bou Hachem is a palace in the medina of Tunis.

== Localization ==
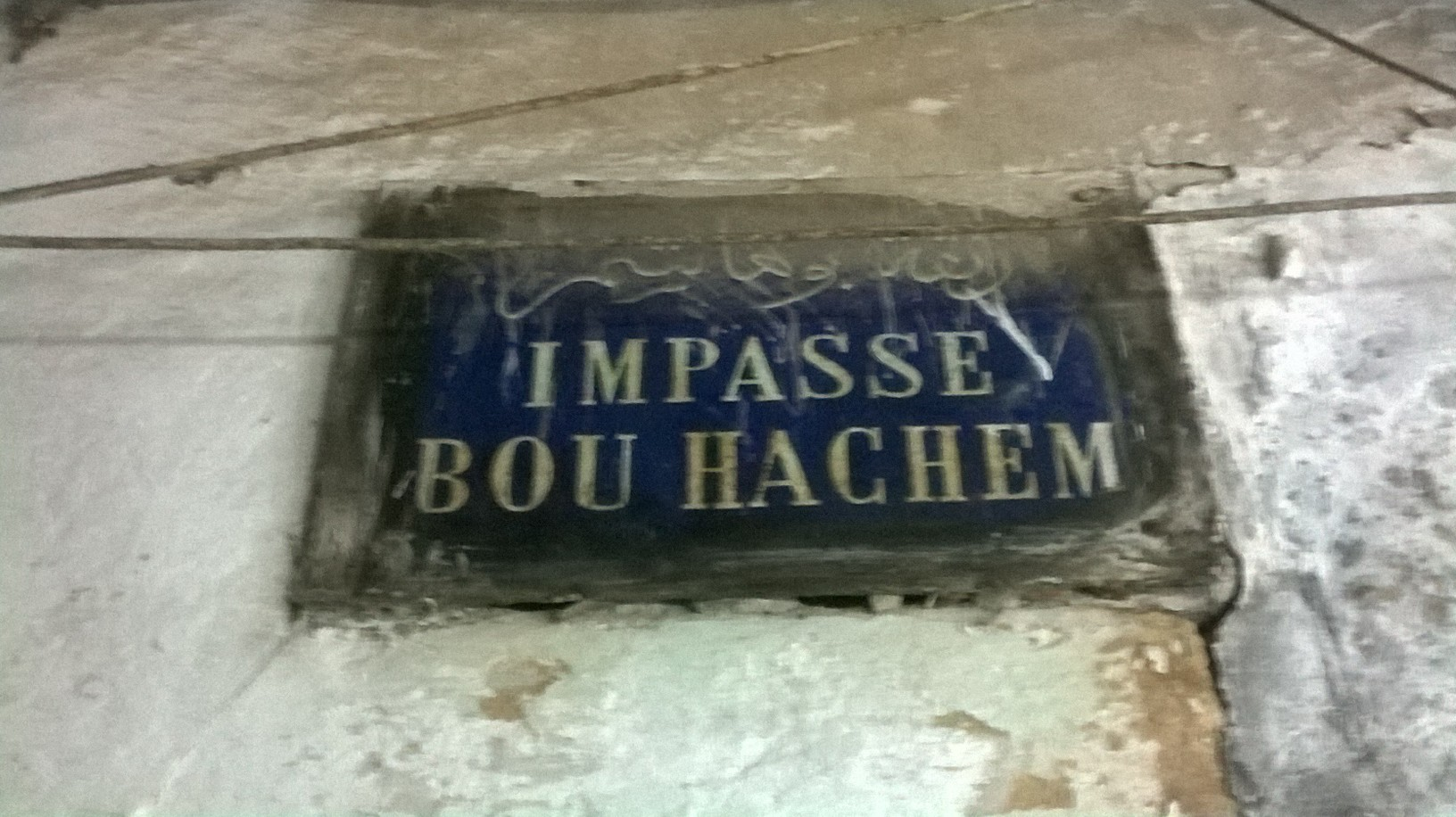
Metallic plaque indicating the Bou Hachem dead end

This palace is situated in a dead end named "Bou Hachem", which is deriving from the street where it is located.

== Bou Hachem family ==
The owners of this palace came to Tunis under the Hafsid dynasty's reign.

They lived in this house during the 19th and the early 20th century.

== Architecture ==
The access to this palace is defended by a solid closed door. It is a narrow passage, covered at its beginning by a series of five vaults.

The doors of the makhzen lead to a covered walkway.

The raised patio is surrounded by richly decorated apartments decorated with earthenware, stucco and marble.
