= Hayreddin Palace =

Old palace in the Medina of Tunis

Coordinates: 36.801706°N 10.168655°E

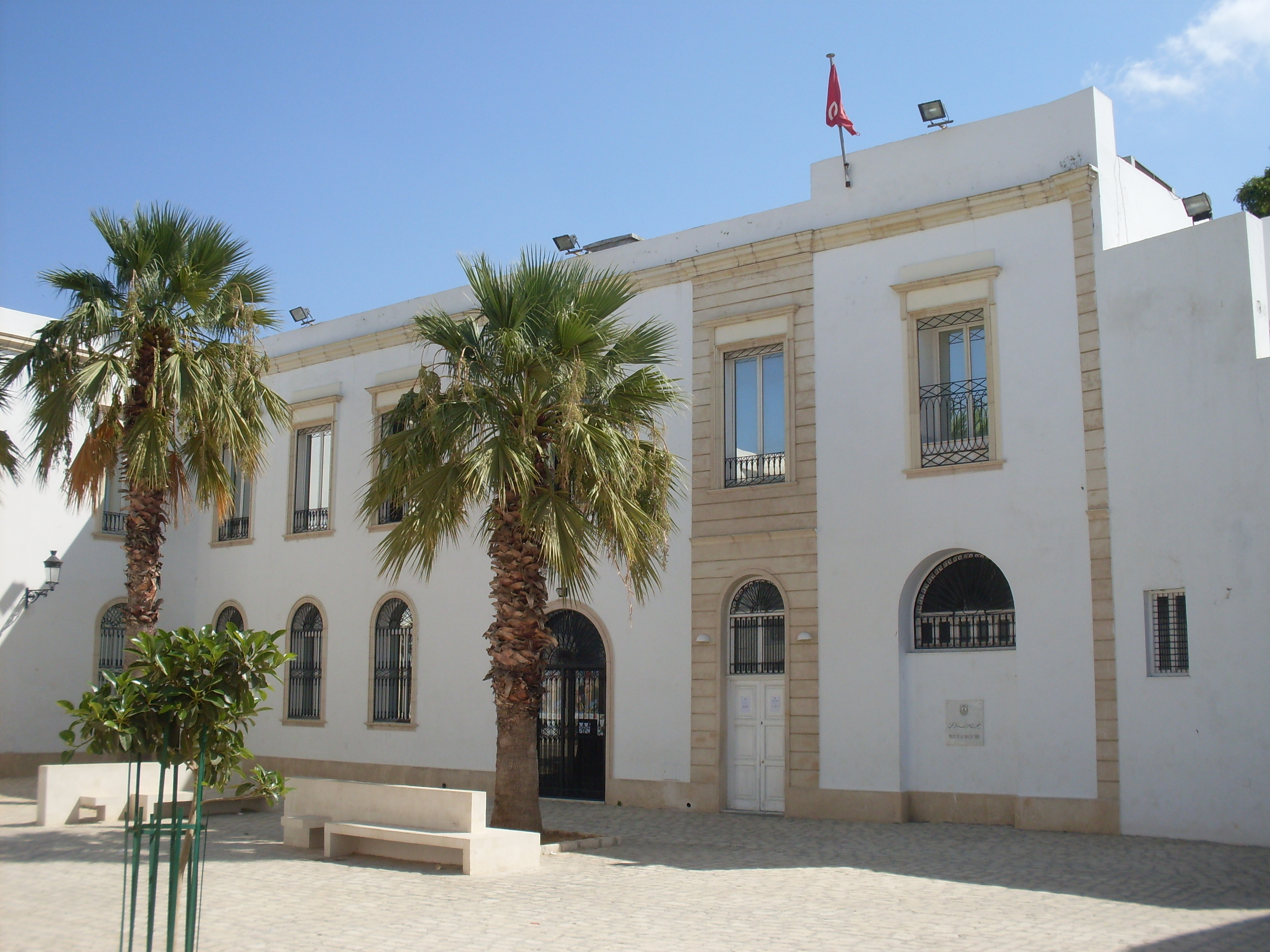
Facade of the palace and Tribunal's place

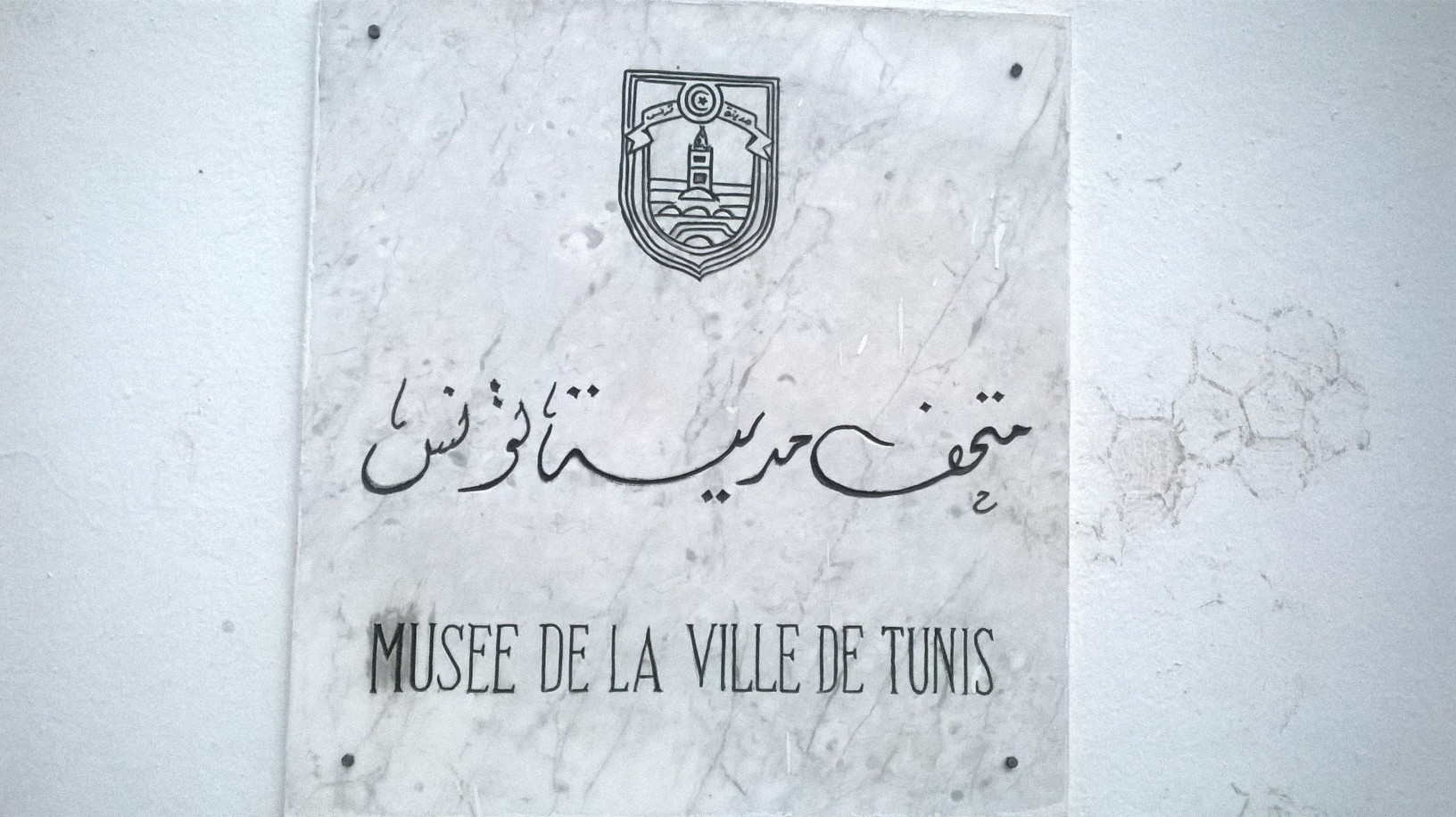
Marble plaque of the Museum of Tunis

Hayreddin Palace is an old palace in the Medina of Tunis. It is the current Museum of Tunis.

== Localization ==
It is located in the Tribunal's place, near El Hafsia district.

== History ==
It was built between 1860 and 1870 under the orders of Hayreddin Pasha.

The palace was sold in 1881 during the French occupation and became a justice court.

A big part of it was destroyed and got replaced by an Israelite school.

It is considered as an official monument according to the 19 October 1992 decree.

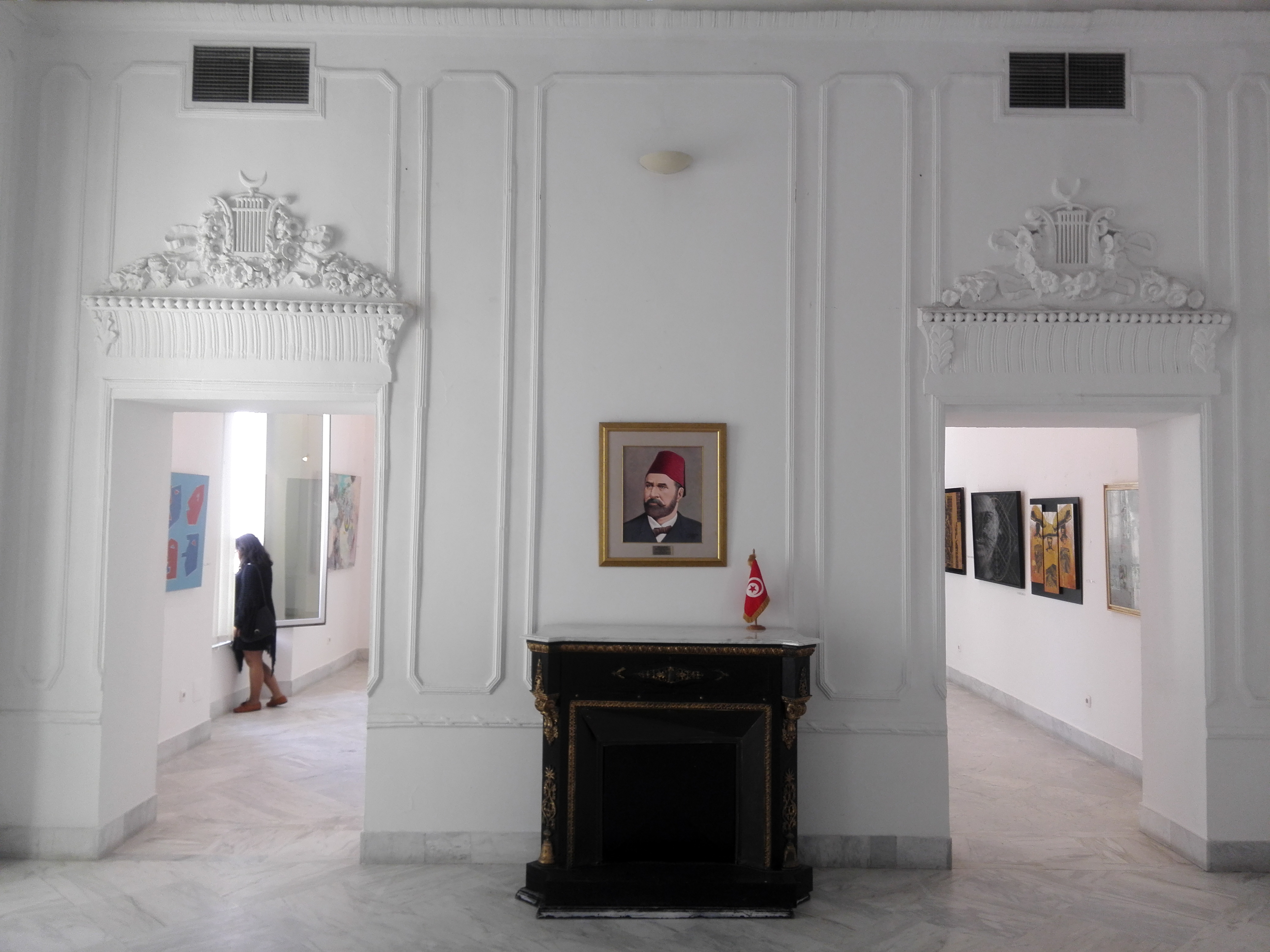
Remains of the old palace

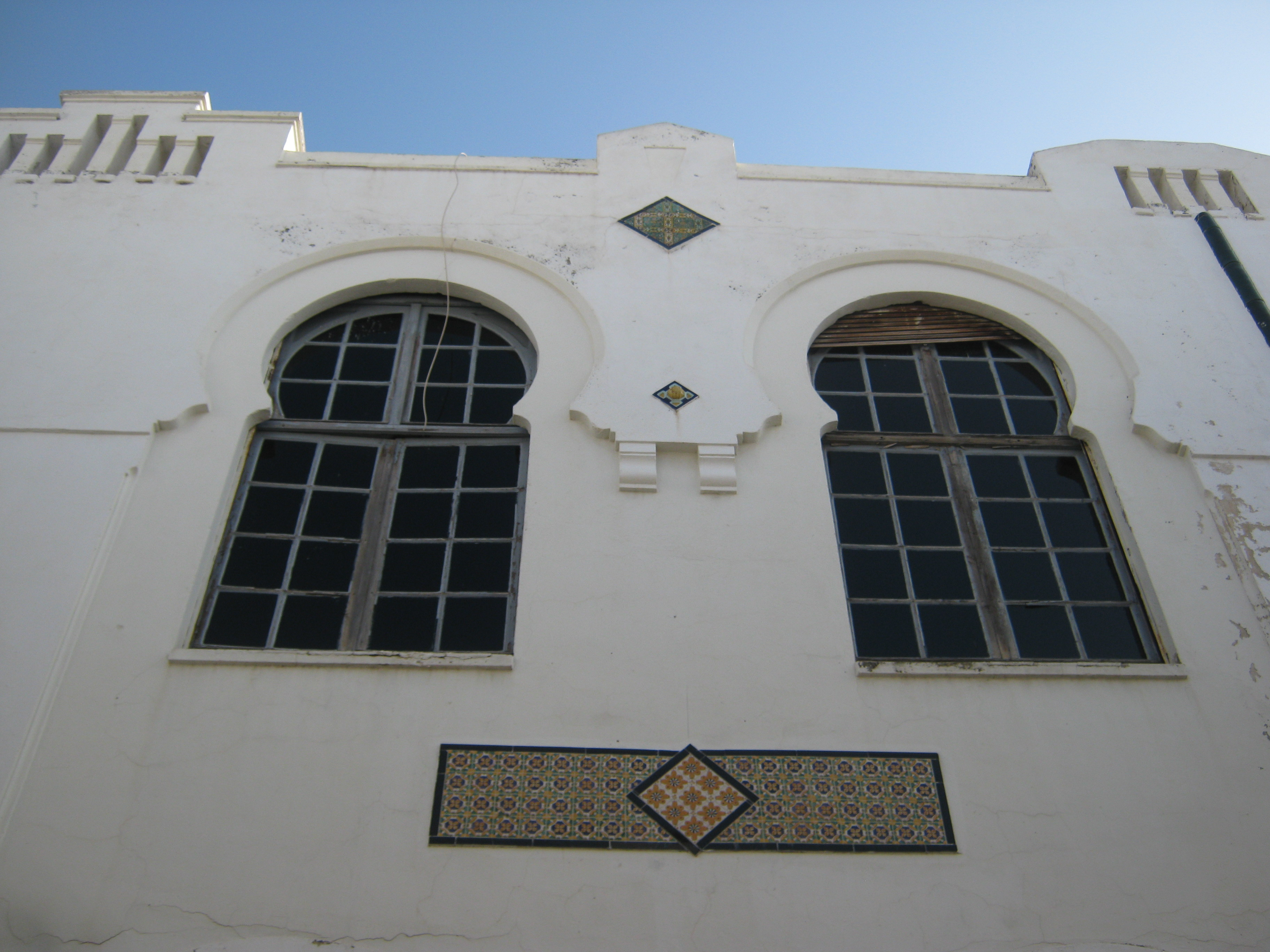
The Israelite school

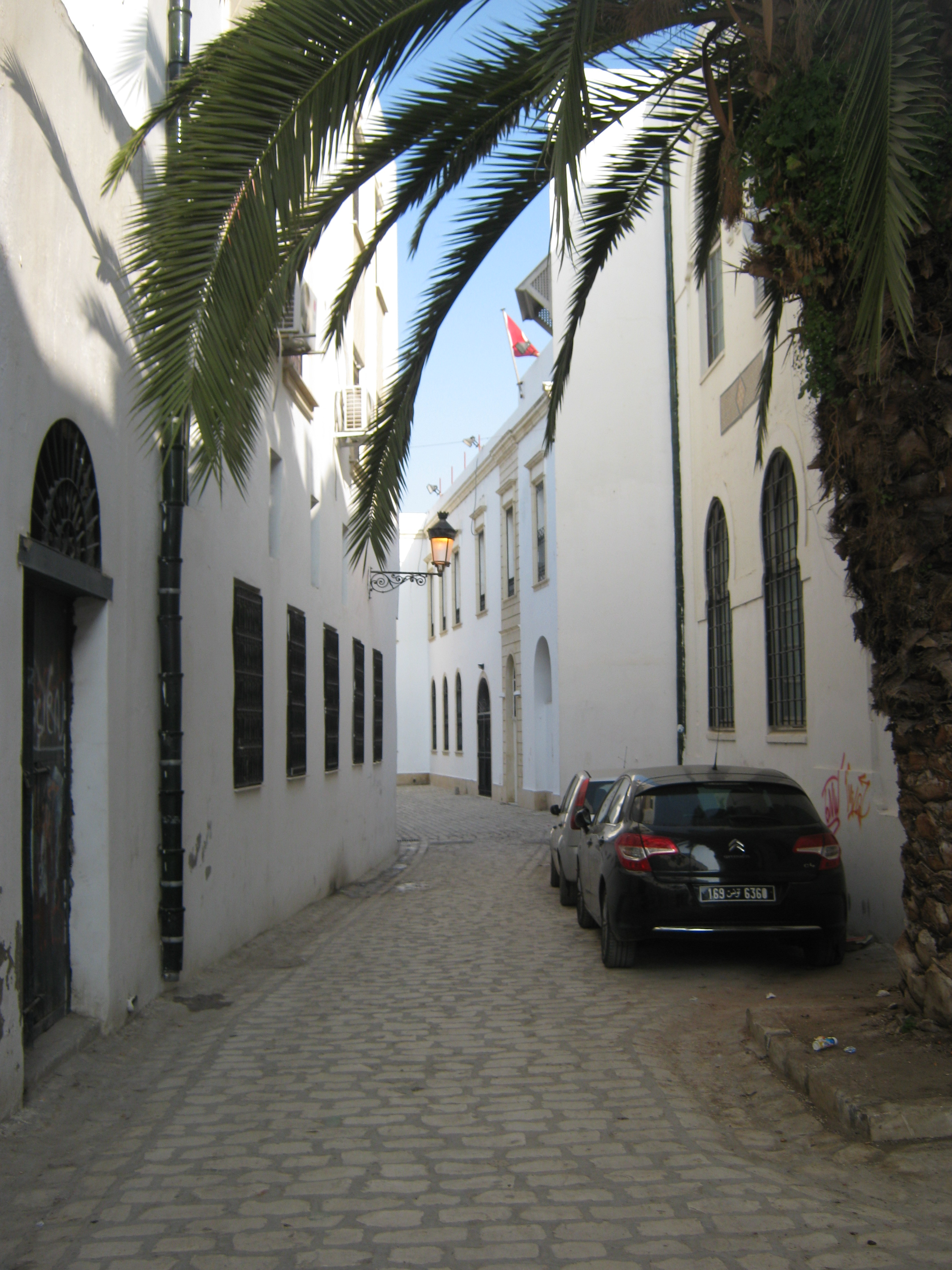
Tribunal Street

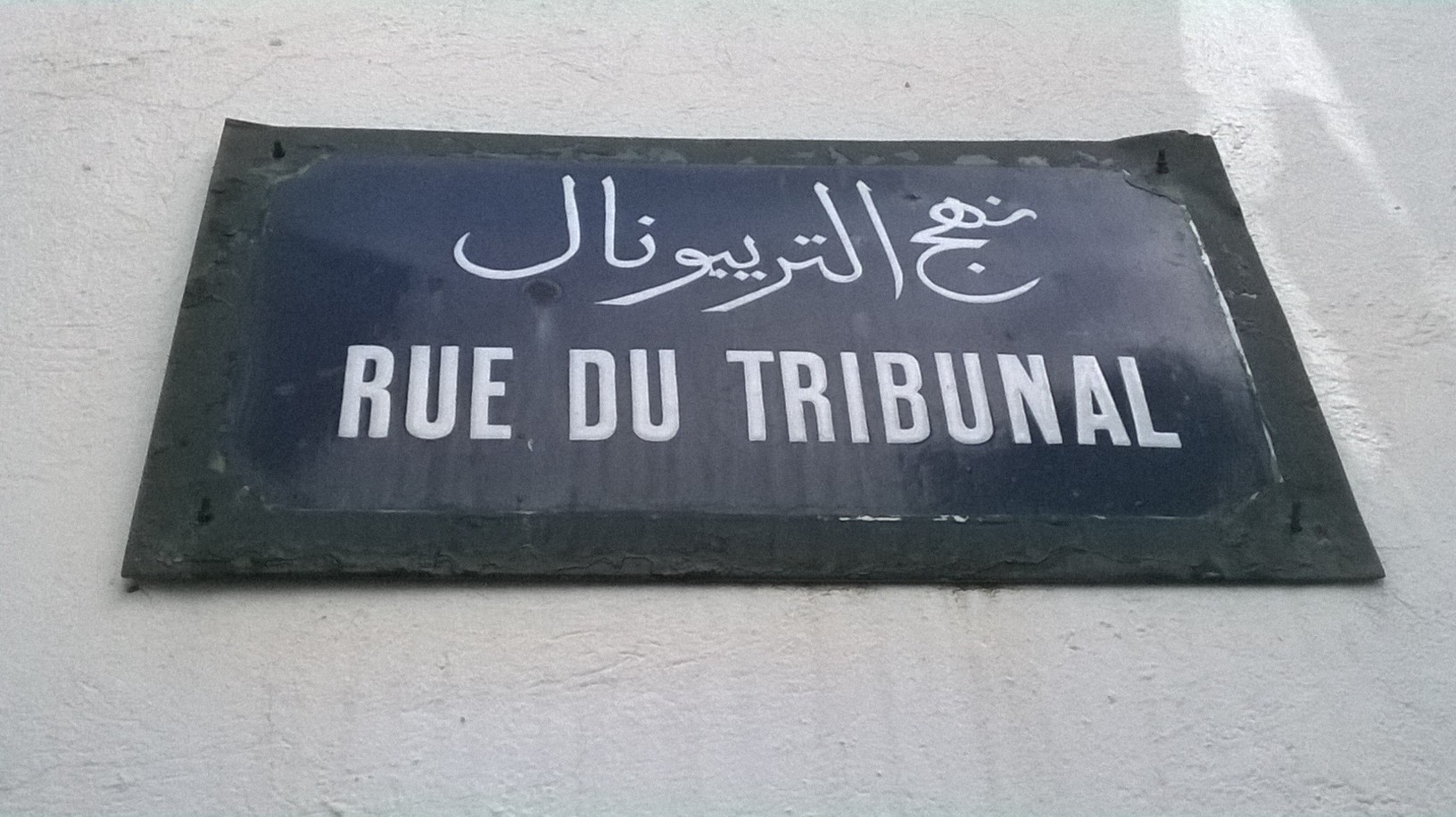
Metallic plaque of Tribual Street
