= Dar Djaït =

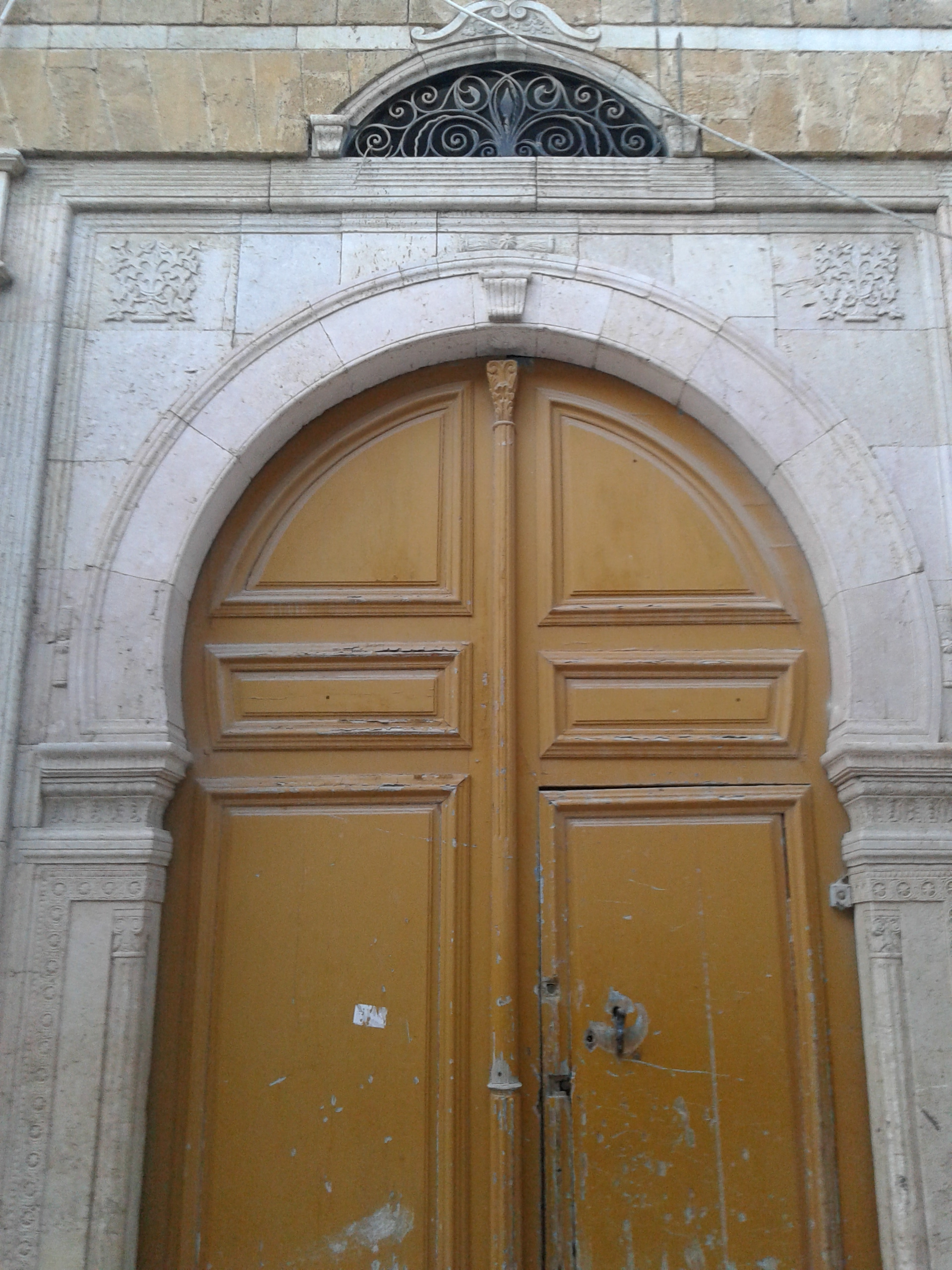
- Entrance of the palace

General information
- Type: Palace
- Location: Medina of Tunis, Tunis, Tunisia
- Year built: 19th Century
- Client: Djaït Fmaily; Youssef Djaït; Mohamed Djaït; Mohamed Abdelaziz Djaït; Abdeljalil Djaït; Mohamed Djaït

Dar Djaït is an old palace of the Medina of Tunis. It is located in the Street of Sidi ben Arous.

== History ==
The family of Djaït were a noble family of Tunisia, and they moved to Tunisia during the reign of Mourad III Bey

.

The palace was built during the 19th century. Many reparations were done during the second half of the 20th century, and it was inhabited by the Djaït family until 2008.

== Architecture ==
The front door of the entrance leads to a staircase made of white marble.
