= Dar Jouini =

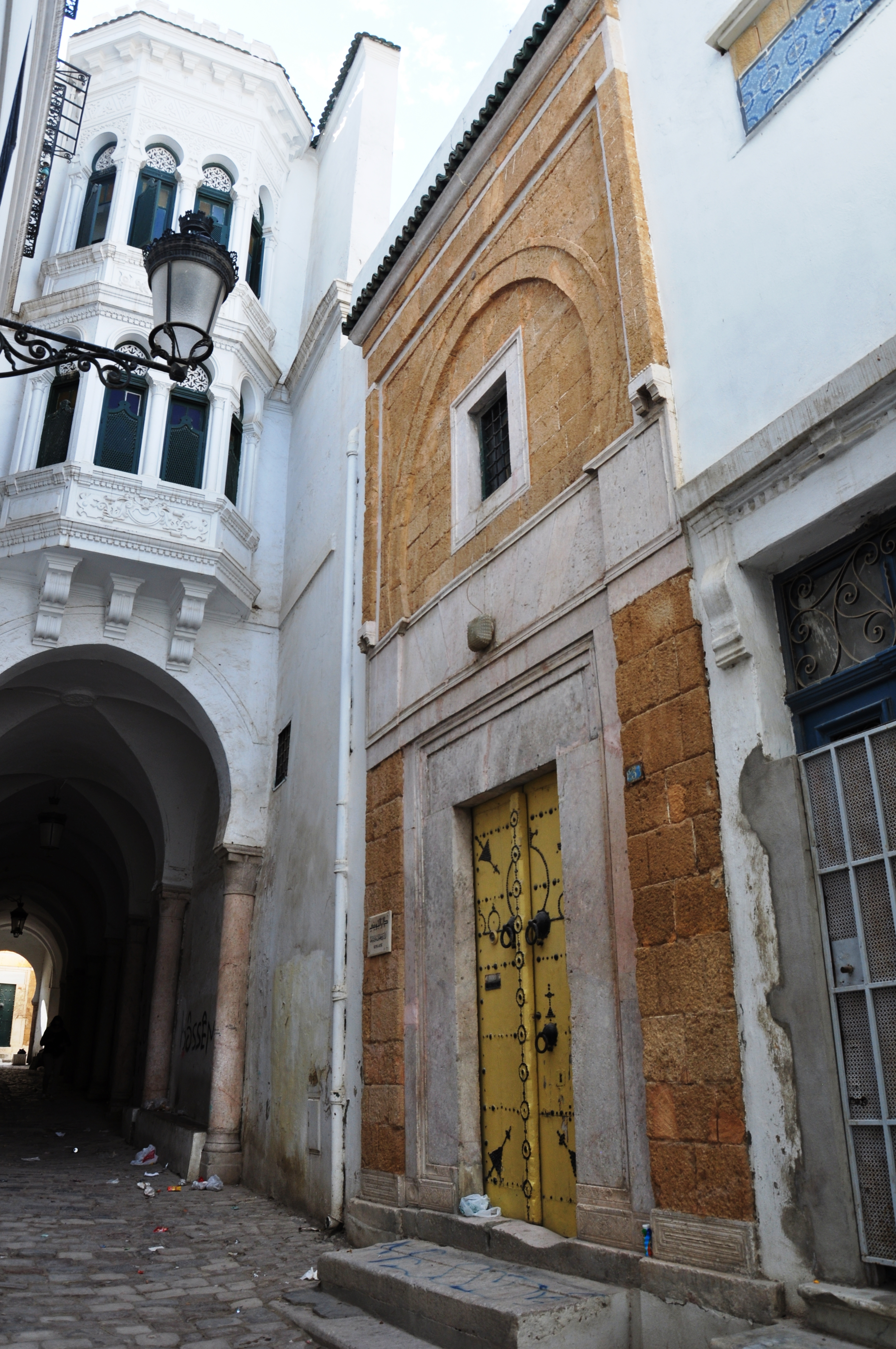
Dar Jouini's entrance

Dar Jouini (Arabic: دار الجويني), also known as Dar Romdhan Bey (دار رمضان باي) is one of the palaces of the medina of Tunis.

== Localisation ==
The palace is located next to Romdhane Bey Square and just in front of Dar Lasram.

== History ==
The monument was built during the 17th century. It was constructed in 1696 by Romdhane Bey who lived there until his death in 1699. In 1912, the musician Ali Riahi was born in the house. In 1936, an agricultural businessman, Mohamed Sadok Jouini, bought the house. Dar Jouini was classified as a national monument on 30 July 2002.
