= Dar Balma =

Palace in Tunis

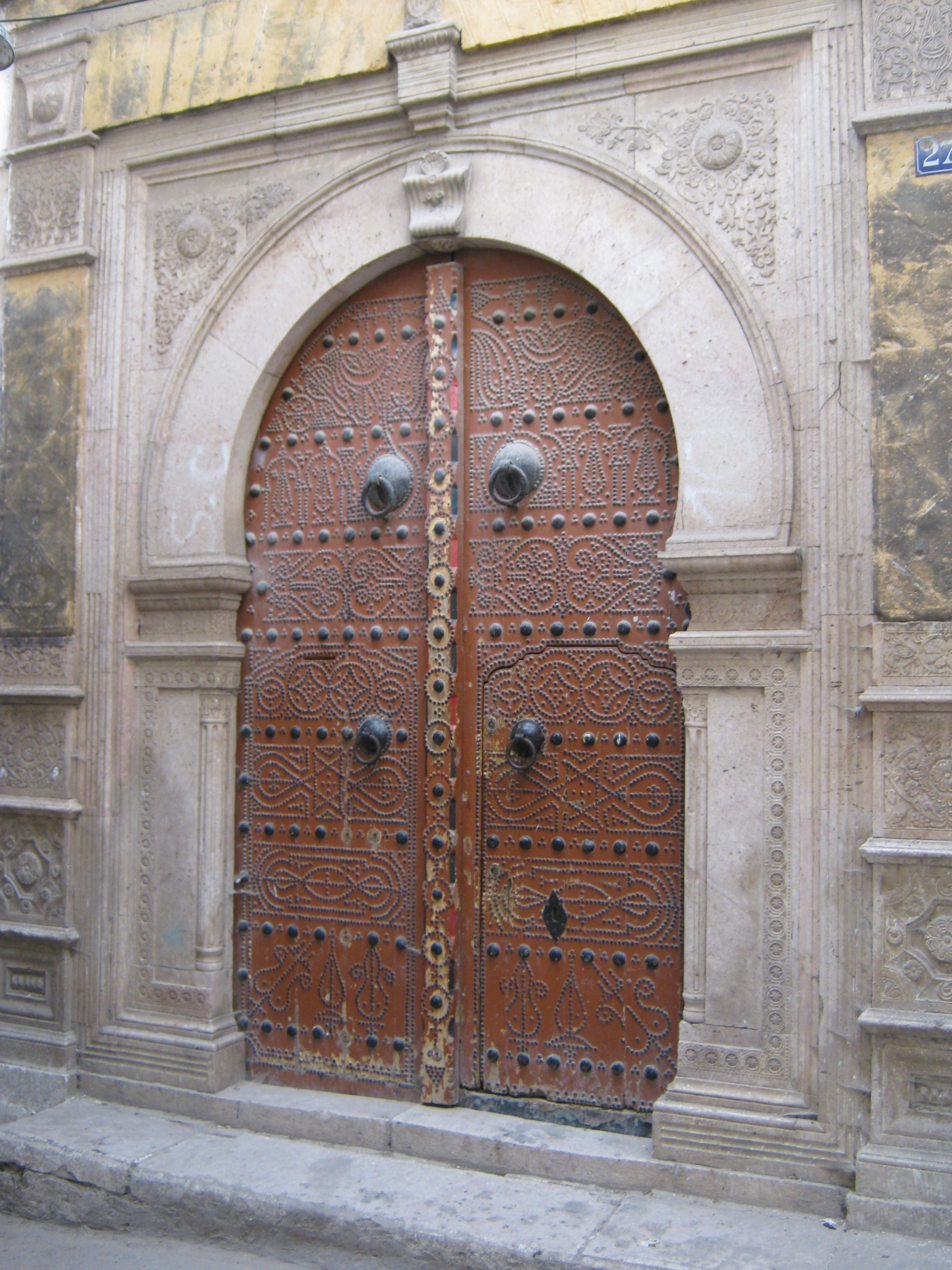
Door of Dar Balma

Dar Balma is an old palace in the medina of Tunis.

== Location ==
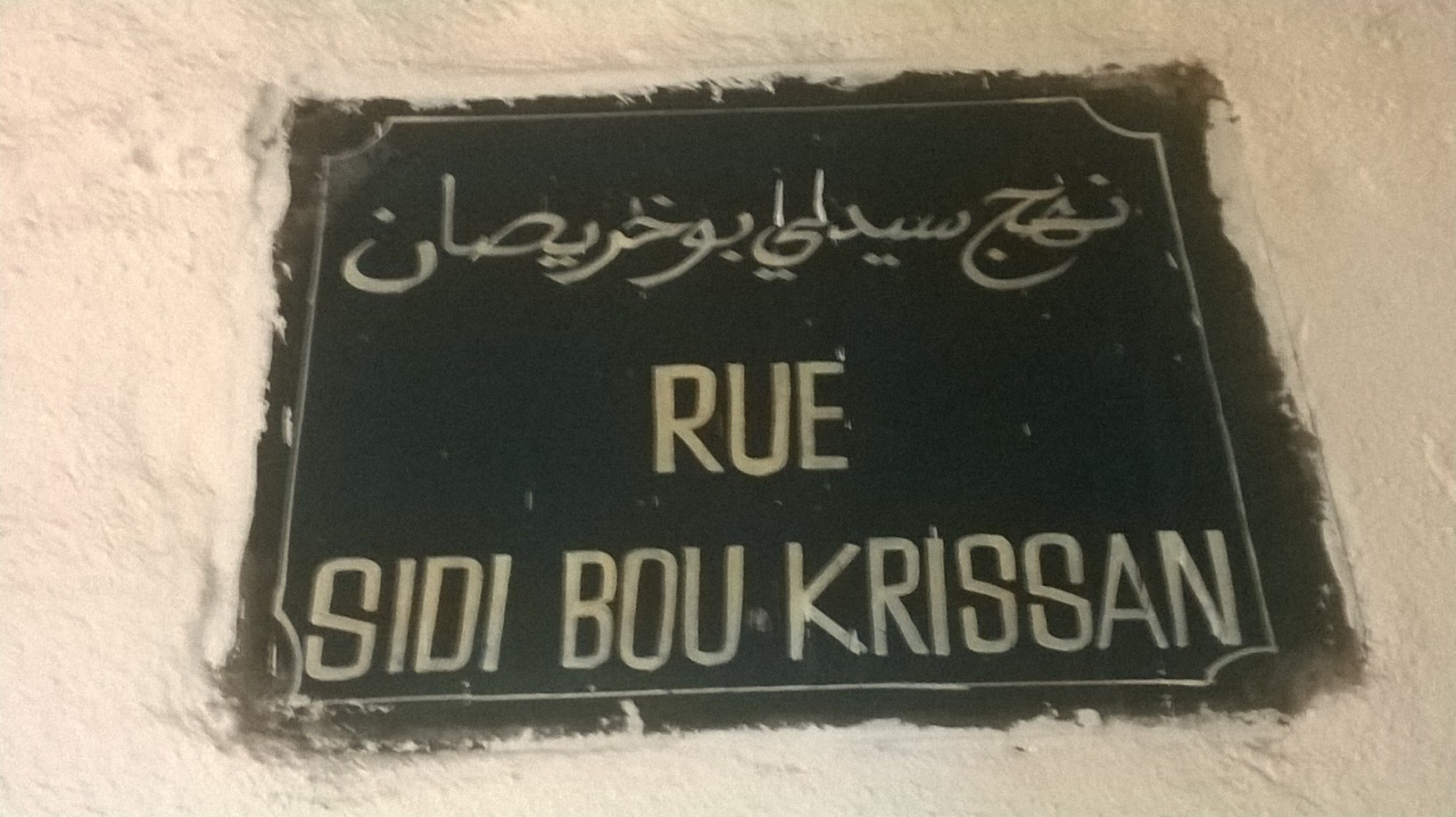
Metal plate of Sidi Bou Khrissan Street

The palace is located in the Sidi Bou Khrissan Street.

== History ==
An old Andalusian family built the palace at the end of the 16th century or at the beginning of the 17th century.

The first plank of Victor Valensi's book L'Habitation tunisienne represents the door of Dar Balma.

== Architecture ==
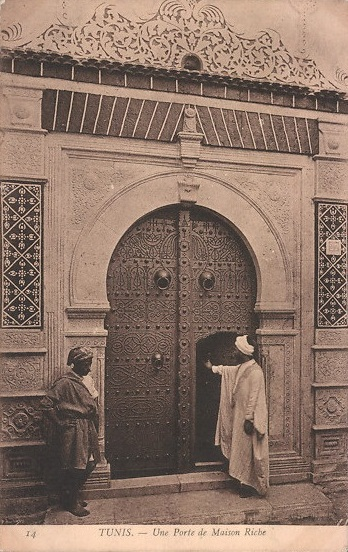
Postcard showing the palace's door

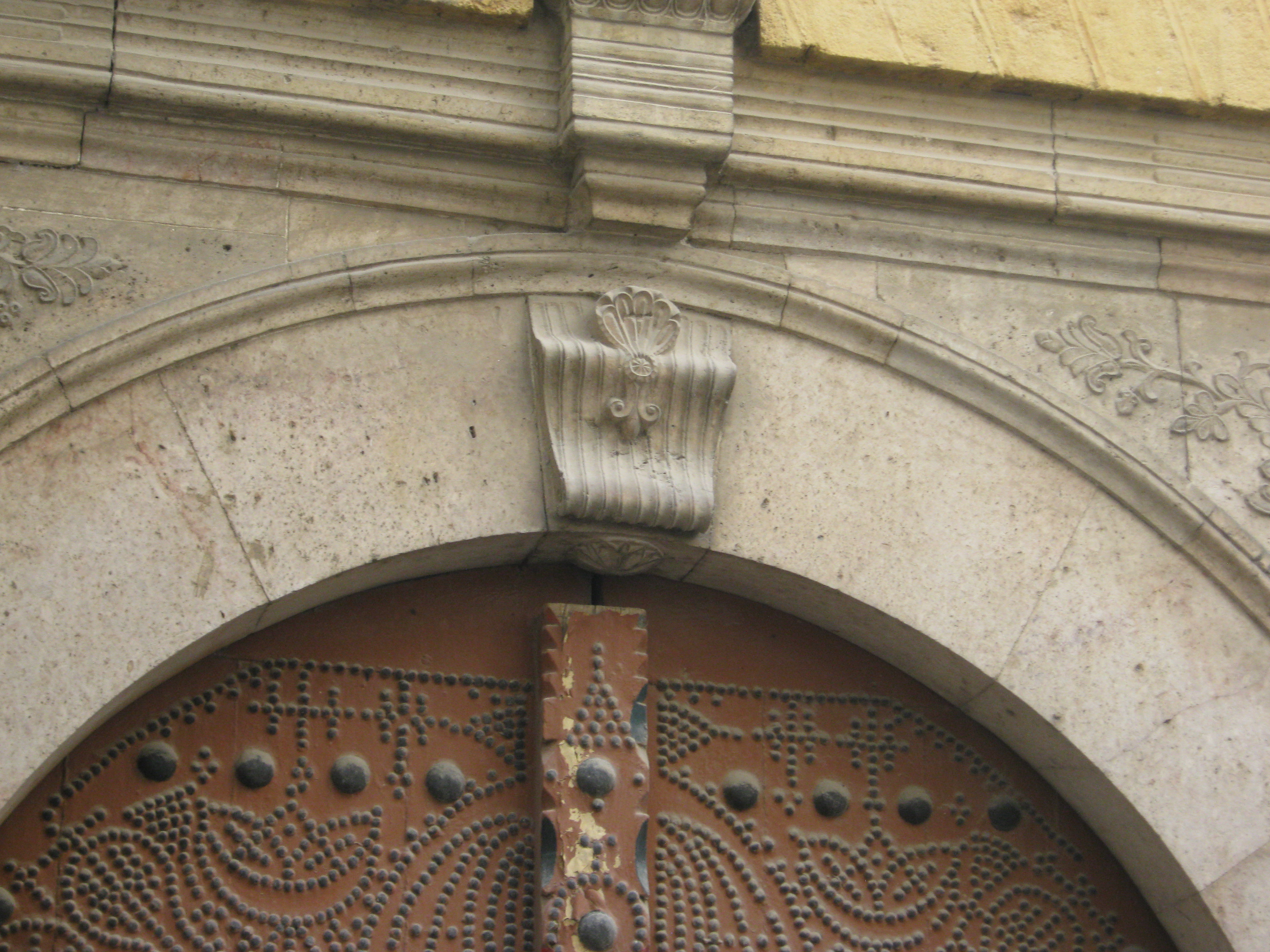
Keystone above the door

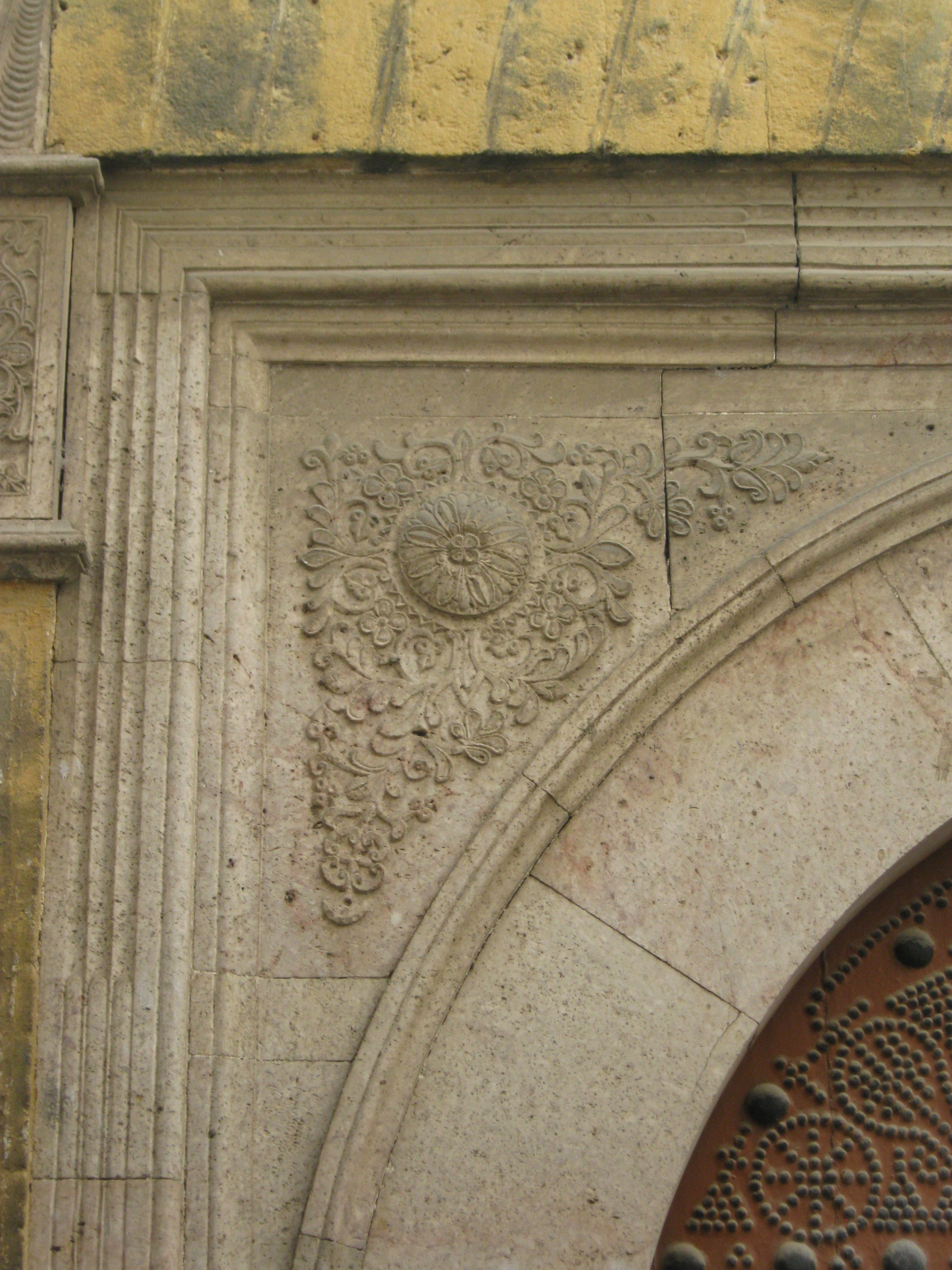
Lloral pattern in the doorway

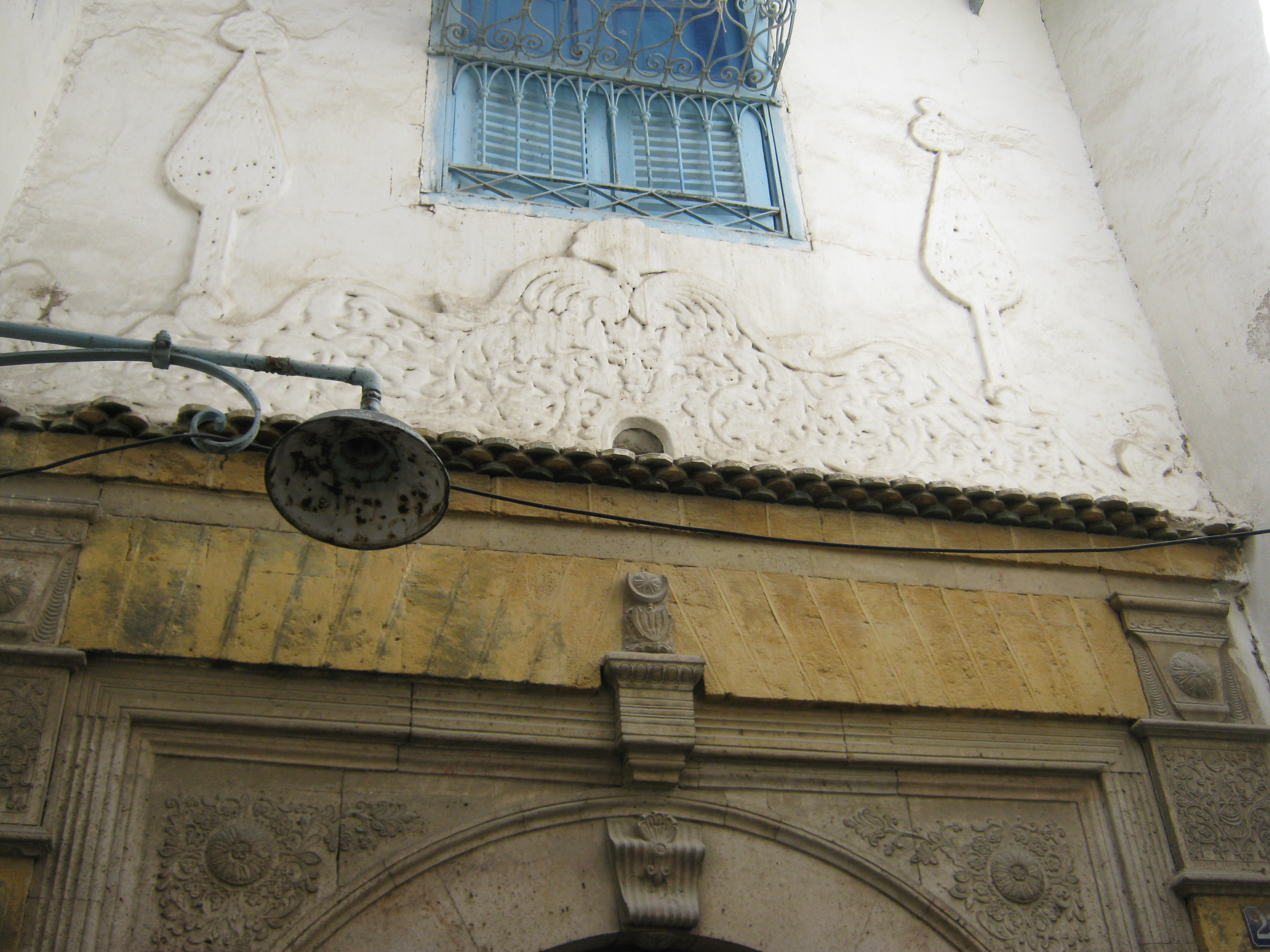
Stylized cypress above the door
