= Dar El Monastiri =

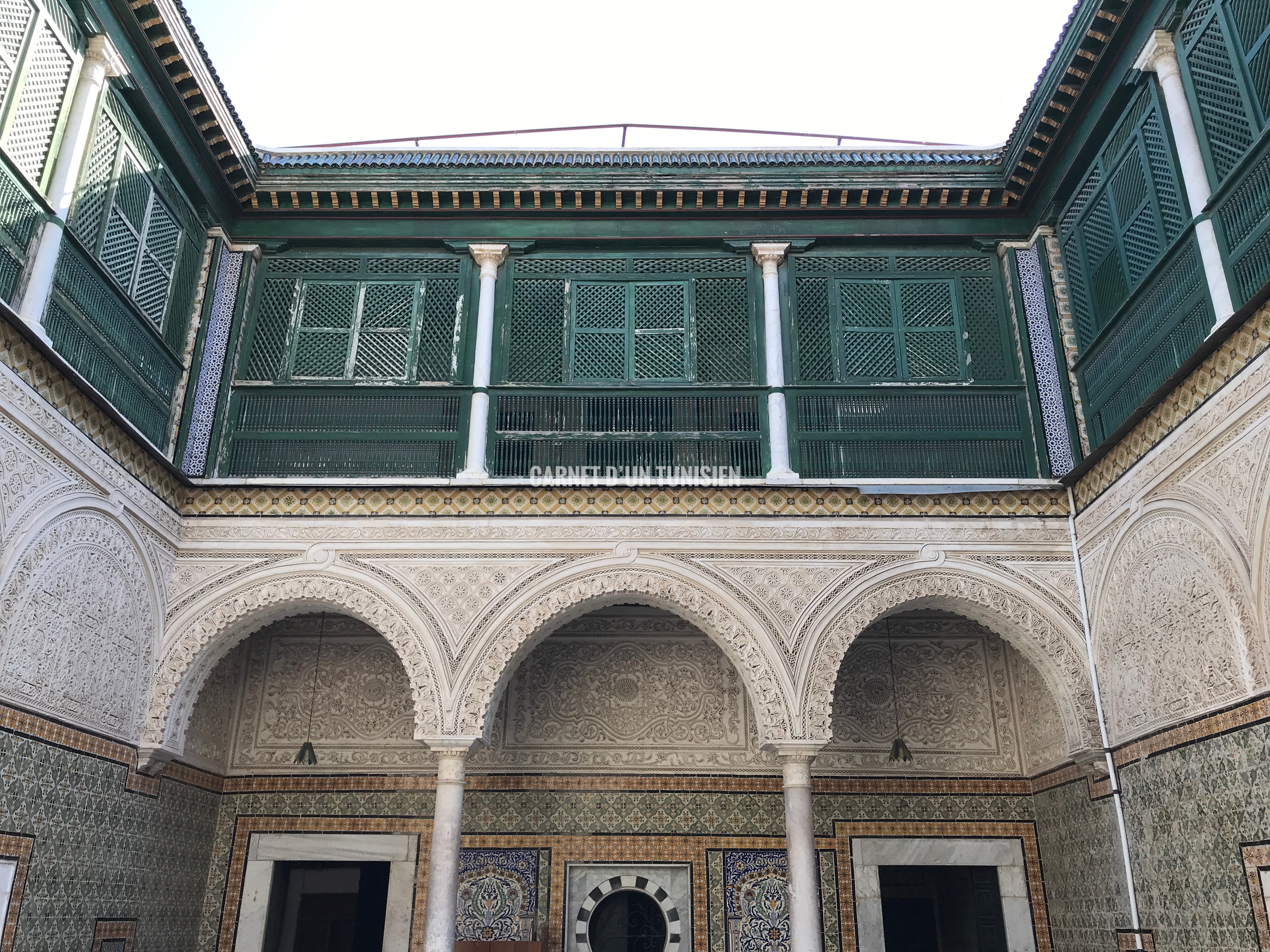
- Interactive map of the Dar El Monastiri area

General information
- Type: Palace
- Architectural style: Moorish architecture Tunisian architecture
- Location: Medina of Tunis, Tunis, Tunisia
- Year built: 1814
- Client: Hussein II Bey; M'hamed El Monastiri

Dar El Monastiri (Arabic: دار المنستيري) is a palace in the Medina of Tunis.

== Localization ==
It is located in 9 El Monastiri Street near Sidi Mahrez mausoleum.

== History ==
The palace was built in the 19th century during the reign of Mahmud Bey, by his son Al-Husayn II who later gave it to M'hamed El Monastiri, a noble and a trader of Chachia (chaouachi). During the French occupation, it was an arts institute.

In 1930, it became the office of craft training and then a regional center of Tunisian arts in 1940.

In 2007, it became the main office of the tunisian center of translation.
