= Dar Ibn Abi Dhiaf =

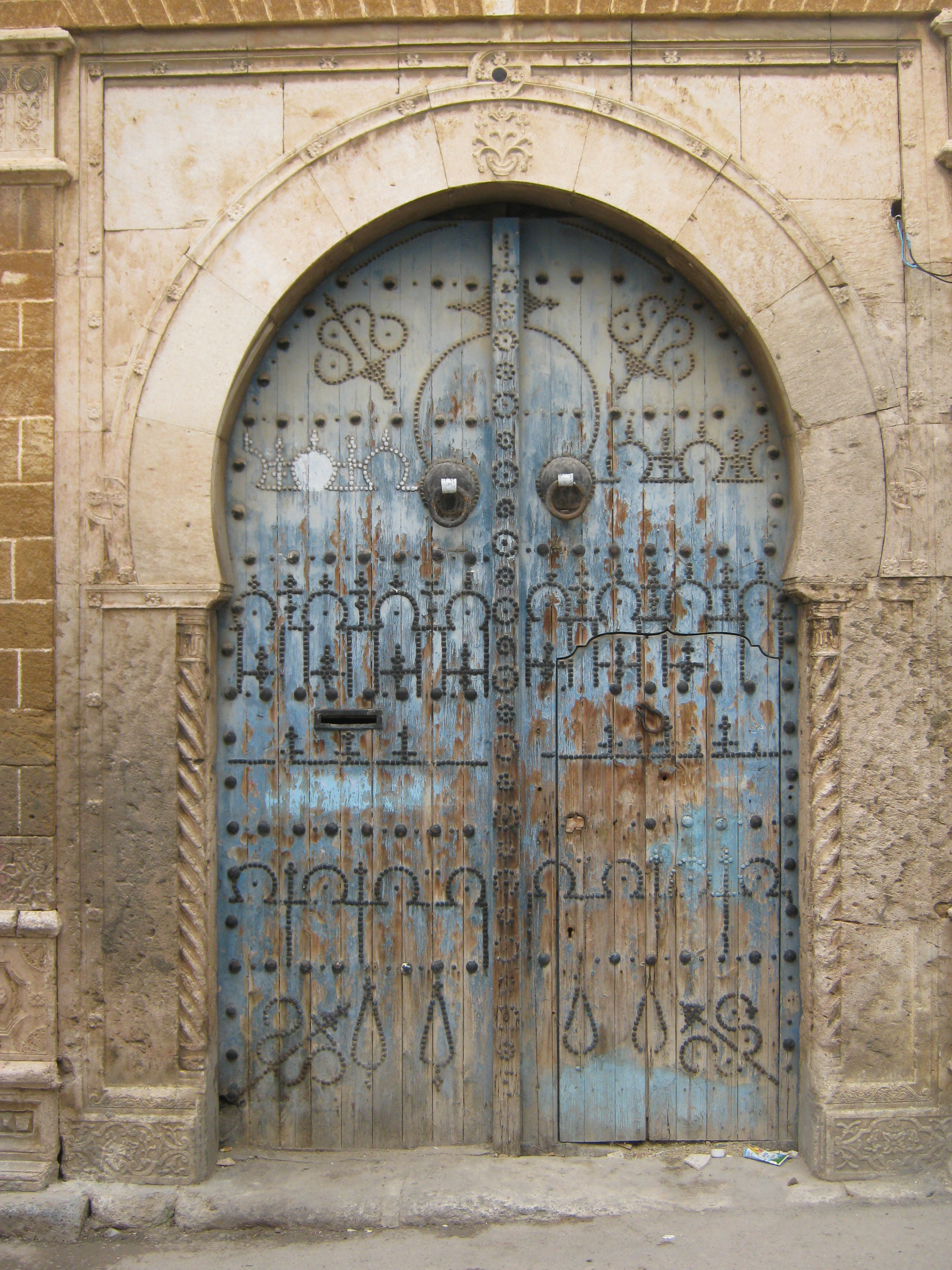
- Entrance of The Palace
- Interactive map of the Dar Ibn Abi Dhiaf area

General information
- Type: Palace
- Architectural style: Moorish; Tunisian; Ottoman
- Location: Medina of Tunis, Tunis, Tunisia
- Year built: 19th Century
- Client: Ahmad ibn Abi Diyaf

Dar Ibn Abi Dhiaf is a palace in the medina of Tunis, located near the Pasha Street and Sidi Mahrez Mosque, in the Ibn Abi Diaf dead end.

== history ==
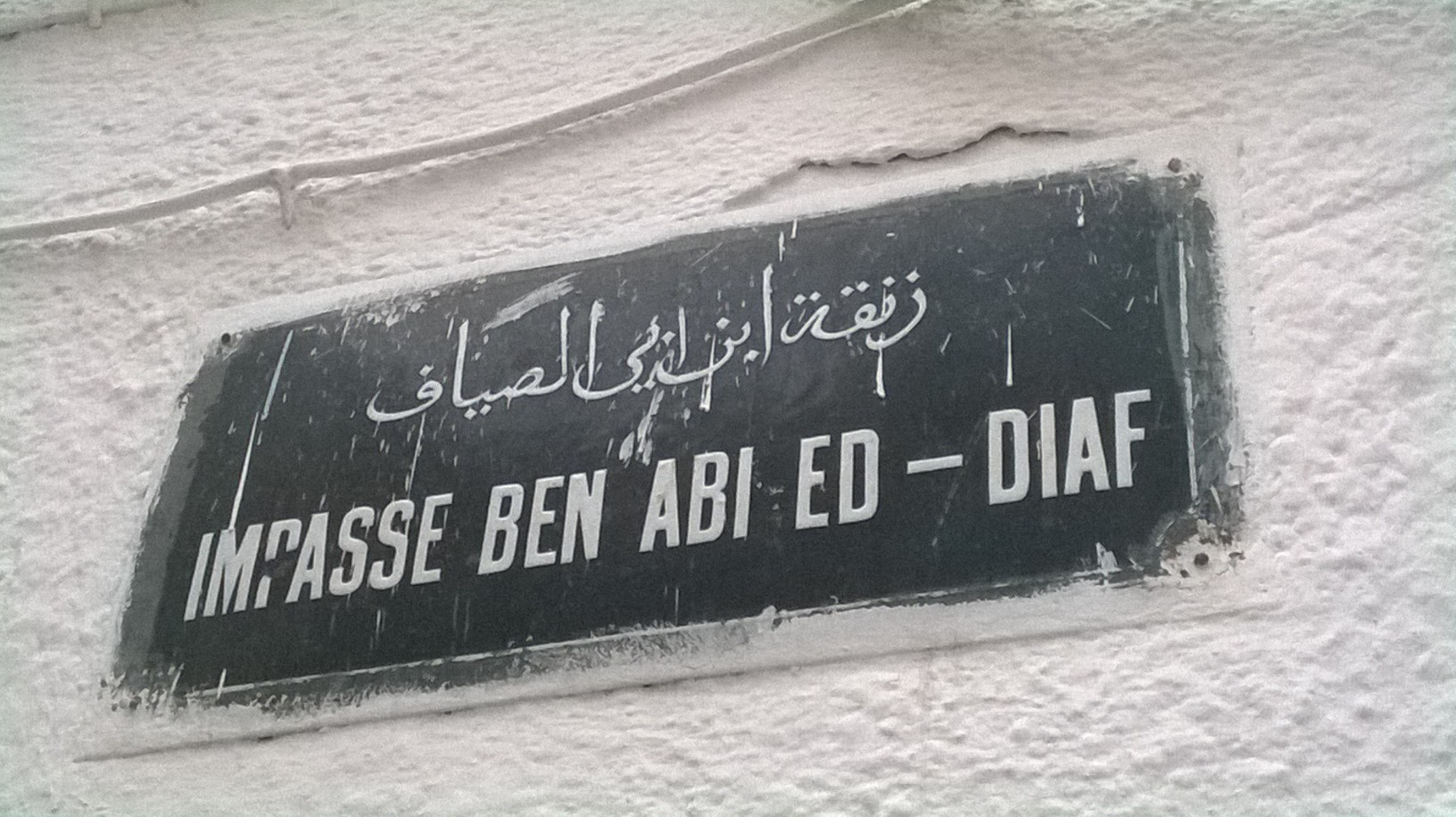
Metallic plaque indicating the Ibn Abi Diaf dead end.

The palace was built by the minister Ahmad ibn Abi Diyaf in the 19th century.

== Architecture ==
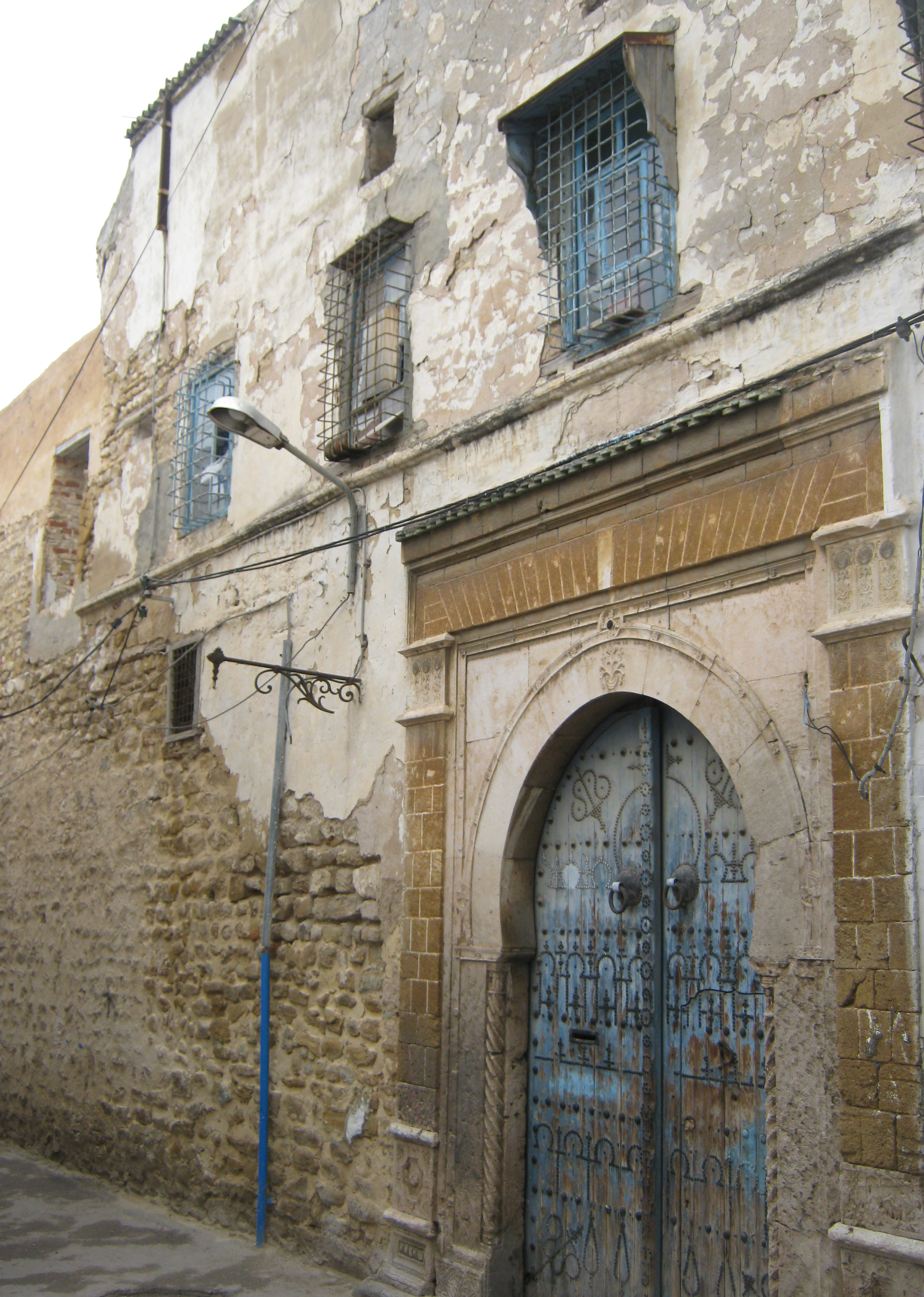
Recent view of the palace.

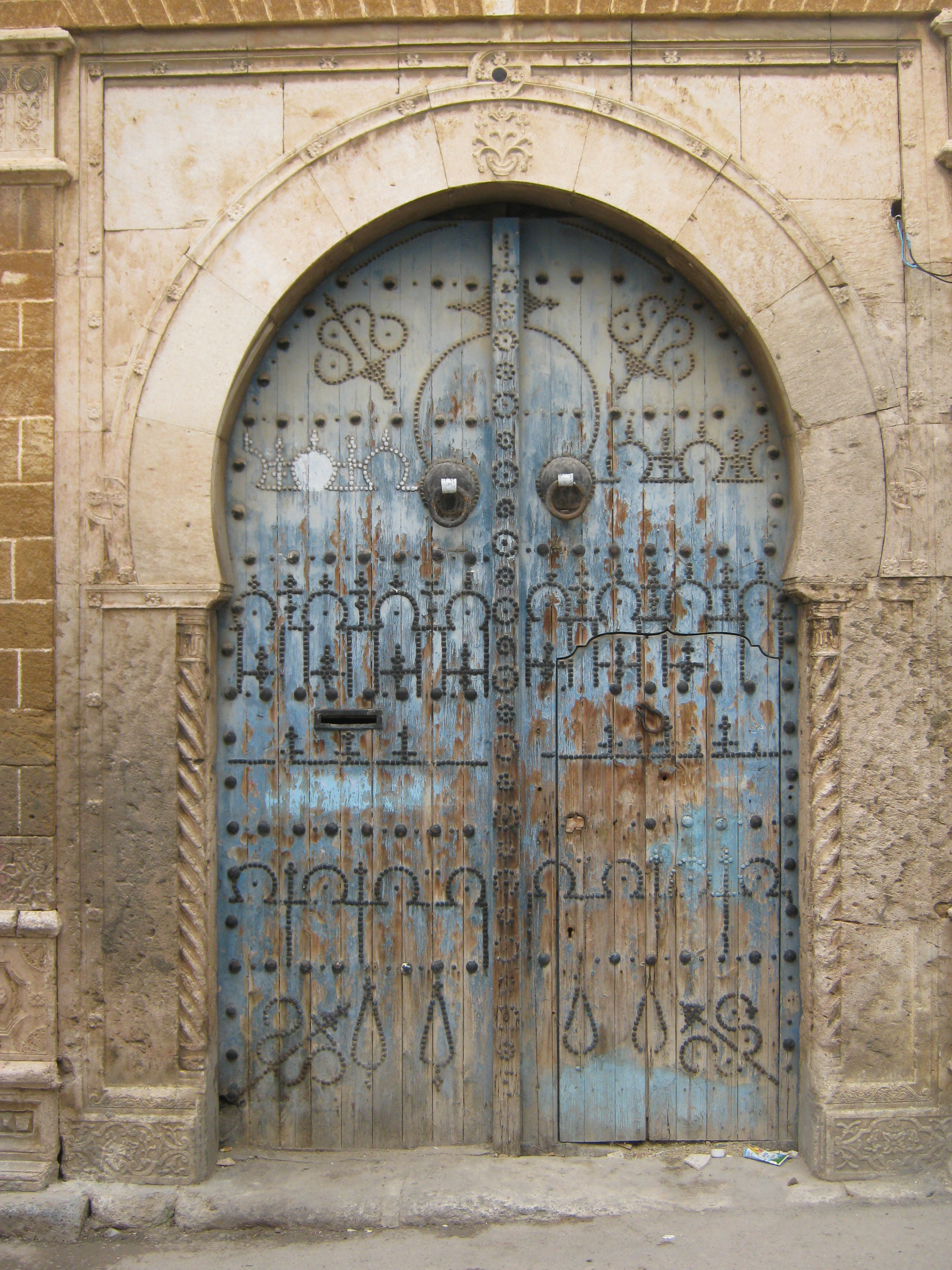
Palace gate

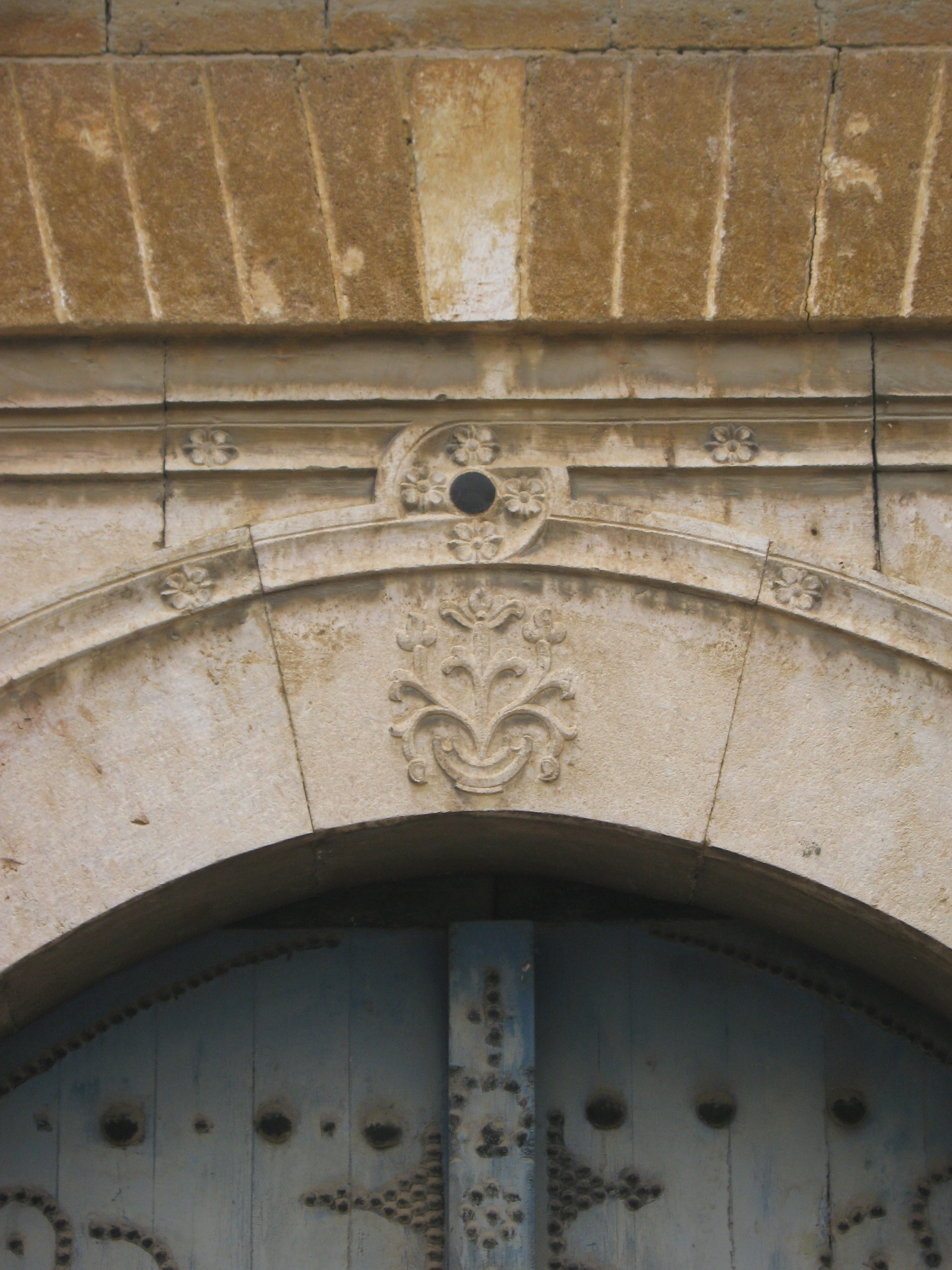
Detail of the palace gate

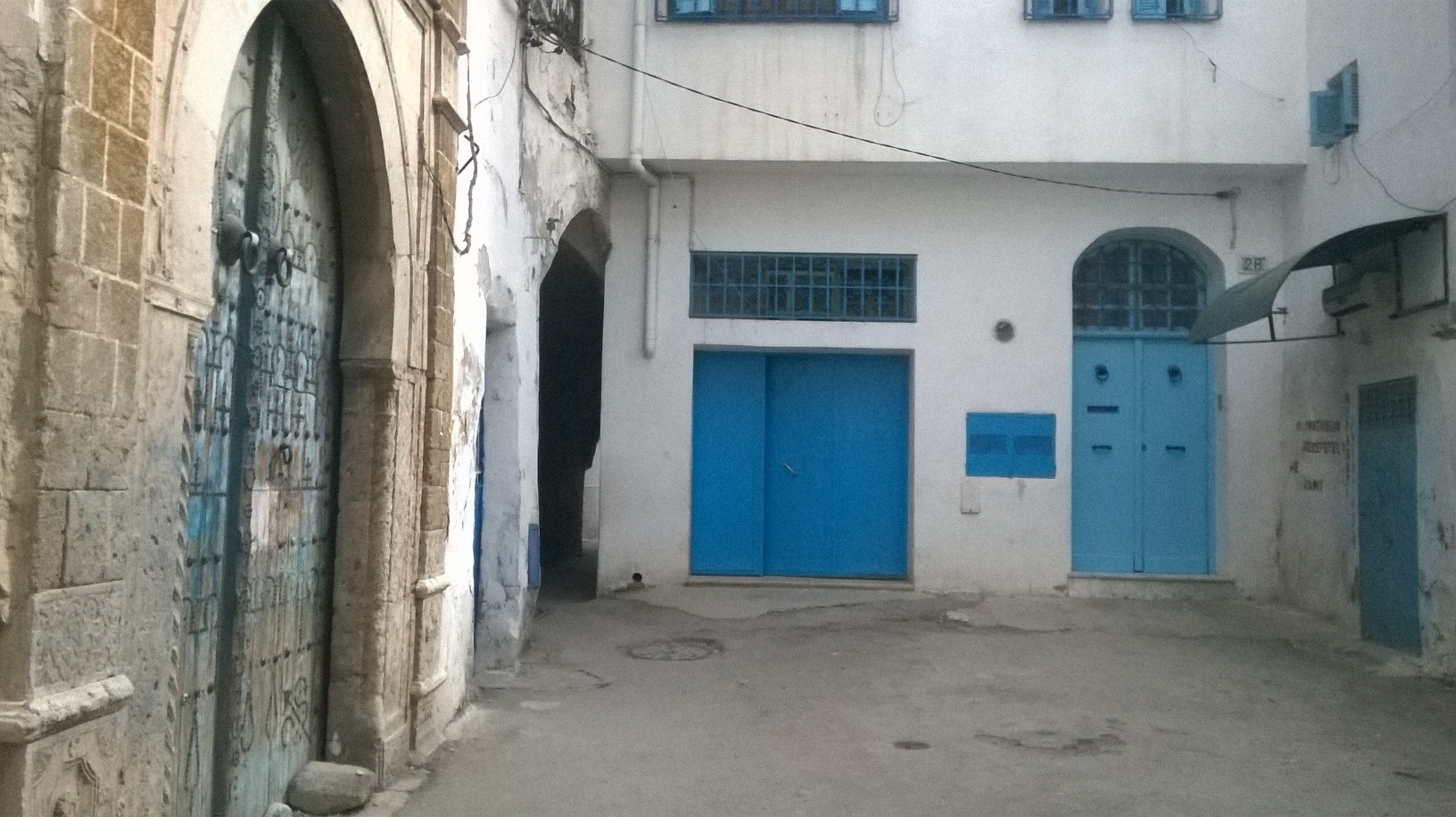
View of the palace
