= List of historical tekkes, zaviyes, and dergahs in Istanbul =

List of historical tekkes, zaviyes, and dergahs in Istanbul, Turkey:

== Eyüp ==
- Kaşgari Dergahı
- Karyağdı Baba Bektaşi Dergahı
- Çolak Hasan Dergahı ve İdris Köşkü
- İdris Muhtefi Dergahı ve Zevki Sultan Namazgahı
- Dolancı Mevlevihanesi
- Hatuniye Dergahı
- Bahariye Mevlevihanesi
- Özbekler Kalenderhanesi
- Abdulkerim Efendi Oluklubayır Dergahı
- Hacı Ali Nakşi Dergahı
- İslam Bey Bedevi Tekkesi
- Haki Baba Dergahı
- Kantari Baba Dergahı
- Baba Haydar Zaviyesi
- Şeyhulislam Mustafa Efendi Dergahı
- Musa Çavuş Kirpasi Tekkesi
- Ahmed Dede Dergahı
- Ümmi Sinan Türbesi, Nasuh Efendi Tekkesi
- Cemal Efendi Dergahı
- İzzet Mehmed Paşa Nakşi Dergahı
- Tamaşvar Defterdarı İbrahim Bey Tekkesi
- Lagari Mehmed Efendi Taşlıburun Sa’di Dergahı
- Şah Sultan Sünbüli Dergahı
- Adile Sultan Dergahı
- Hüsrev Paşa Dergahı
- Mehmed Paşa Tekkesi
- Cafer Paşa Tekkesi
- Yahya Efendi Dergahı
- Hasan Hüsnü Paşa Dergahı
- Tahir Ağa Dergahı
- Mahmud Efendi Kadiri Dergahı
- Abdülmecid Sivasi Halveti Dergahı
- Şeyh Murad Tekkesi
- Sertarikzade Tekkesi
- Kolancı Dergahı
- Emir Buhari Nakşi Dergahı
- Cemaleddin Uşşaki Asitanesi
- Ahmed Efendi Alaca Tekkesi
- Kolancı Şeyh Emin Baba Kuyubaşı Bektaşi Dergahı
- Mustafa Selami Efendi Nakşi Dergahı
- Mustafa Paşa Tekkesi
- Balçık Sadiye Dergahı
- Kılınçcı Baba Dergahı
- Afife Hatun Balcı Dergahı
- Haffaf Tekkesi
- Ser Tekke
- Ya Vedud (Hatice) Sultan Tekkesi
- Tokmak Dede Tekkesi
- Abdullah Ağa Dergahı

== Eminönü ==
- Şeyh Mehmed Geylani Bursa Tekkesi
- Yıldız Dede Halveti Dergahı
- Hoca Kasım Günani (Uşşaki) Zaviyesi
- Safveti Paşa Nakşi Dergahı
- Aydınzade Halveti (Hasan Ünsi) Dergahı
- Sancaktar Baba (Abdurrahman Şami) Rifai Dergahı
- Malatyalı İsmail Ağa Naziki (Mudanyalı-zade Nakşi) Dergahı
- Erdebili Sinan Halveti Dergahı
- Sultan Ahmet Tekkesi
- Mısırlı (İbrahim Efendi Kadiri) Dergahı
- Akbıyık Muhyiddin Efendi Halveti Dergahı
- Düğümlü Baba Zaviyesi (Arabacıbaşı Dergahı)
- Üçler Halveti (Bülbülcü-zade) Dergahı
- Özbekler Nakşi Dergahı
- Hindular Kalenderhanesi
- Sokullu Mehmed Paşa Tekkesi
- Şeyh Aziz Efendi Şeyhler Rufai Dergahı
- Küçük Ayasofya Celveti Dergahı
- İbrahim Paşa Sünbüli Dergahı
- Saraç İshak Rufai Dergahı
- Havuzlu Uşşaki Tekkesi
- Baba Ali Şahzengi (Seyyid Hasan Efendi) Dergahı
- Kadiri Dergahı
- Çalak Halveti Dergahı
- Hulusi Efendi Tekkesi
- Hacı Beşir Ağa Nakşi Dergahı
- Gümüşhaneli Ziyaeddin Efendi Nakşi Dergahı
- Kaygusuz Baba Kadiri Dergahı
- Havta Şazeli Dergahı
- Kasım Çelebi Dergahı
- Kara Baba Rufai Dergahı
- Çorlulu Paşa Tekkesi
- Hekim Çelebi Dergahı (Fazlullah Efendi Tekkesi)
- Abdüsselam Sa’di Dergahı (Kovacı Tekkesi)
- Çoban Çavuş Süleyman Ağa Dergahı
- Alaca Mescid Rufai-Nakşi (Sadık Efendi) Dergahı
- Musalla Tekkesi
- Üsküplü Çakır Ağa Mercimek Dergahı (Kurşunlu Türbe Halveti Tekkesi) (Hacı Müştak, Esad Baba Dergahı)
- Ali Çavuş-Altuncuzade Dergahı
- Üryani (Üryani Baba Türbesi) Zaviyesi
- Kalenderhane Camii
- Keşfi Osman Efendi Celvetiyye Dergahı
- Deruni Mehmed Efendi Nakşi Dergahı
- Şeyh Helvai Rufai Dergahı
- Pehlivanlar Tekkesi
- Şeyh Vefa Dergahı
- Süleymaniye Zaviyesi
- Hilalci Tekkesi
- Balıkpazarı Tekkesi

== Fatih ==
- Haydari Hüseyin Dede Kadiri Zaviyesi (Bekir Ağa Tekkesi)
- Hoca Mübarek Tekkesi
- Cism-i Latif (Gureba) Tekkesi
- Sırraciye Dergahı
- Kırkağaçlı Mehmed Emin Efendi Dergahı (Emin Ağa Tekkesi)
- Hindular Kalenderhanesi
- Yahya Efendi Nakşi Dergahı (İmam Sinan Tekkesi)
- Osman Efendi Atpazarı Tekkesi (Kul Nakşi, Fazl-ı İlahi Dergahı)
- Dülgerzade Dergahı
- Ordu Şeyhi Halveti (Yesarizade, Hafız Efendi) Dergahı
- Şeyh Alaaddin Celveti Dergahı
- Sırrı Efendi (Kambur Mustafa Paşa) Dergahı (Kıztaş, Esrar Efendi Tekkesi)
- Sofular Halveti Dergahı
- Ebe Kadın (Şeyh Tevfik Efendi) Tekkesi
- Feyzullah Efendi (Halıcılar, Şeyh Visali) Tekkesi
- İsmail Efendi Tekkesi
- Hasan Efendi Kadiri Dergahı (Sarıgüzel Tekkesi)
- Kilise Sa’diyye (İsa) Dergahı
- Muabbir Hasan Efendi Nakşi Dergahı (Kapı Halifesi, Ahmed Efendi Tekkesi)
- Hüsrev Paşa Dergahı (Arif Efendi Rifai Tekkesi)
- Çenezade Dergahı (Fındıkoğlu Tekkesi)
- Çakırzade Dergahı
- Emir Ahmed Buhari Asitanesi
- Süleyman Efendi Halveti Dergahı (Sinan Ağa Tekkesi)
- Mehmed Emin Tokadi Tekkesi
- Akşemseddin Dergahı (Semerci İbrahim Tekyesi)
- Bakkalbaşı Tekkesi (Mustafa Dede Nakşi Dergahı)
- Abid Çelebi (Şeyh Resmi) Tekkesi
- Hacegi (İplikçi Hüsameddin) Tekkesi
- Şeyh Resmi Kadiri Dergahı
- Sivasi Halveti (Yavsi, Şemseddin Sivasi) Dergahı
- Samanizade Ömer Hulusi Efendi Dergahı (Misli Ali Efendi Tekkesi)
- Osman Efendi Halveti Dergahı
- Kazasker (İsmail Hakkı) Tekkesi (Sarmaşık Dergahı)
- Ayşe Hatun Zaviyesi (Resmi Tekkesi)
- Mahmud Bedreddin Efendi Dergahı (Hazmi Efendi Tekkesi)
- Kabakulak Kadiri (Mescitzade, Tahtaminare ve Mustafa Ahi Resmi) Dergahı
- Karabaş Tekkesi
- Halil Nizami Taşçı Halveti Dergahı
- Acıçeşme Zaviyesi (Habbaz Muhyiddin, Ekmekçibaşı Tekkesi)
- Nuri Efendi Zıbın-ı Şerif Tekkesi
- Bekir Ağa Tekkesi
- Ejder Efendi Sa’di Dergahı (Mehmed Sıdkı Efendi Tekkesi)
- Ahmed Kamil Efendi Nakşi Dergahı
- Mehmed Şemseddin Efendi Dergahı (Muhyi Efendi Tekkesi)
- Muameleci Şeyh Tekkesi (Ümmi Kenan Rifai Dergahı)
- Salih Efendi Tekkesi
- Zekaizade Halveti Dergahı
- Mehmed Ağa Dergahı (Bayram Veli, Yayabaşı Tekkesi)
- Rakım Efendi Nakşi Dergahı
- Dırağman Nakşi Dergahı (Tercüman Yunus, İsazade Salih Efendi Tekkesi)
- Keşfi Efendi Nakşi (Kefeli) Dergahı
- Kurt Ağa Tekkesi
- Nureddin Cerrahi Asitanesi
- Kayserili Tekkesi
- Boyalı Mehmed Paşa Dergahı (Bülbülcüzade Tekkesi)
- Koğacı Dede Tekkesi
- Hamza Efendi Halveti Dergahı
- Başmakçı Tekkesi
- Keskin Dede Zaviyesi
- Sertarikzade Halveti Dergahı
- Mehmed Arif Efendi Dergahı
- Sirkeci Sünbüli Dergahı (Yorgani, Ebulfeth Gazi Tekkesi)
- Karasarıklı İbrahim Efendi Dergahı
- Ağa Şeyh Tekkesi
- Said Çavuş Ata Efendi Dergahı (Şeyh Raşid, Şeyh Murad ve Müfti Hamamı Tekkesi)
- Abdülhalim Efendi Dergahı (Şeyh Halim Efendi, Yeşil Tulumba Tekkesi)
- Mehmed Efendi Dergahı
- Emir Buhari Nakşi Dergahı
- Nalıncı Memi Dede (Şeyh Kapani) Zaviyesi
- Şazeli Ahmed Dergahı
- Muhyiddin Kocevi Zaviyesi
- Hıfzi Efendi Zaviyesi
- İsmet Efendi Zaviyesi
- Refet Efendi Halveti Zaviyesi (Lokmacı Tekkesi)
- Mesnevihane Camii Mesnevi Dergahı
- Murad Molla Nakşi Dergahı
- Mustafa Efendi (Şeyh Kamil Efendi) Dergahı (Kadı Sadi Efendi, Kesmekaya ve Şimşekler Tekkesi)
- Çakır Ağa Sa’di Dergahı
- (Yazıcızade) Hulusi Efendi Dergahı
- Sami Efendi Tekkesi
- Battal Gazi Dergahı
- Nakşibendi Dergahı
- Hakiki Osman Efendi Halveti Dergahı (Çuhadar Tekkesi)
- Gürcü Şeyh Ali Efendi Gülşeni Dergahı
- Ferruh Kethüda Tekkesi (Balat Zaviyesi)
- Hazreti Cabir Zaviyesi
- Çınarlı Tekke
- Yatağan Kadiri Dergahı (Hacı İlyas, Şeyh Ömer Tekkesi)
- Toklu İbrahim Dede Zaviyesi (Şeybetü’l Hudri Tekkesi)
- İvaz Efendi Kadiri Dergahı
- Emir Buhari Nakşi Dergahı (Şeyh Selim Tekkesi)
- Kuşadalı İbrahim Efend Asitanesi (Şamiler Tekkesi)
- Hafid Efendi Tekkesi
- Masum Efendi Tekkesi
- Cafer Ağa Tekkesi
- Kara Nohut Rufai Dergahı (Sülüklü, Sülüklü Çeşme ve Erzurumlu Fazıl Efendi Rufai Tekkesi)
- Oğlan Şeyh İbrahim Efendi Dergahı
- Hacı Bayram-ı Kaftani (Tavil Mehmed Efendi, Edhemler ve Tekirdağlı Mustafa Paşa) Tekkesi
- Rabia Hatun Zaviyesi
- Tokmaklı Bostan, Ekrem Efendi ve Hamidiye Tekkesi
- Kara Mehmed Paşa Sünbüli Dergahı
- Sancaktar Hayreddin Sa’di Dergahı (Şahbaz Paşa Tekkesi)
- İnebey Dergahı
- Yunus Efendi Tekkesi
- Küçükzade Dergahı
- Zıbın-ı Şerif Tekkesi
- Doğanlı Baba Tekkesi
- Keyçi Hatun (Taştekneler, Yalaklar Kadiri) Dergahı
- Bayrampaşa Başmak-ı Şerif (Baba Efendi) Dergahı
- Bekar Bey (Mehmed Kamil Efendi) Tekkesi
- Şeyh Canib (Sa’di) Dergahı
- Abayi Tekkesi
- Mimar Sinan Halveti Dergahı (Baba Saltuk, Sarı Saltuk Tekkesi)
- Kubbe Dergahı
- Hocazade Dergahı
- Aşık Paşa Dergahı (Yusuf Sinan Zaviyesi)
- Seyyid-i Velayet Tekkesi
- Tahir Ağa Dergahı (Selahaddin Uşşaki Tekkesi)
- Şeyh Bedreddin Tekkesi
- Saçlı Efendi Çırakçı (Şeyh Labib Efendi, Tarakçı) Tekkesi (Kılcı Dergahı)
- Şeyh Murad Tekkesi (Yeni Tekke)(Raşid Efendi Dergahı)
- Mecidiye Zaviyesi (Şerif Kuddusi Nakşi Dergahı)
- Tarsus Rufai Dergahı (Kokçüzade Tekkesi)
- Bala Süleyman Ağa Nakşi Dergahı
- (Zerdeci Şeyh Hüseyin Efendi) Karagöz Halveti Tekkesi
- Örümcekli Dede Tekkesi
- Peyk Dede Kadiri Dergahı
- Seyfullah Efendi Emirler Tekkesi
- Üçler Dergahı
- Alyanak Dergahı (Zehgirci Kemal Tekkesi)
- Mehmed Emin Efendi Tekkesi
- Mimar Acem Dergahı
- Şevki Efendi Dergahı
- Ciğerci Baba Dergahı
- Kal’adibli Dergahı
- Kılınçcı Baba Tekkesi (Kalaycı Tekke)
- Kolancı Baba Tekkesi
- Kırımlı Hasan Efendi Tekkesi (Kırımi Halveti Dergahı)
- Vasfi Efendi Tekkesi
- Hasan Kudsi Efendi Dergahı
- Şeyh Matrak Sa’di (Arabzade, Odabaşı, Şeyh Izzi ve Hasan Kutbi) Tekkesi
- Ahiler (Safvet Efendi Ahiler Vacid) Dergahı
- Gavsi Efendi Kadiri Dergahı (Aydın Kethüda, Numan Efendi Tekkesi)
- Kelami (Esad Efendi) Dergahı
- Yakubzade Tekkesi
- Ebul Huda (Ahmed Safi) Tekkesi
- Ceylanlı Tekkesi
- Hulvi Mahmud Dede (Şirvani) Dergahı
- Deniz Abdal Kadiri Dergahı
- Remli Mehmed Efendi Dergahı (Sırrizade, Kolancı ve Karakullukçu Tekkesi)
- Başçı Mahmud Gülşeni Dergahı (Said Efendi Tekkesi)
- Seydi Baba Nakşi Dergahı (Osman Baba Tekkesi)
- Nureddin Hakkı Efendi Dergahı
- Piri Mehmed Paşa Koruk Tekkesi
- Mahmud Taha Efendi Kadiri Dergahı
- Beşikçizade M. Süleyman Efendi Dergahı (Çavuş Hamam Tekkesi)
- (Yahya Efendi) Yolgeçen Tekkesi
- Şeyh Halil Efendi Kadiri Dergahı
- Cündi Hürrem Dergahı (Yakubzade Tekkesi)
- Seyyid Halife Halveti Dergahı (Kız Ahmed Efendi Tekyesi)
- Fenayi Tekkesi
- Şerbettar Rifai Dergahı (Elvan Efendi, Elvanzade, Numan Efendi Tekkesi)
- Vani (Kürkçü) Dergahı (Lalezar Tekkesi)
- Kadızade Mehmed Kadiri Dergahı (Altıpatlar, Haffafzade Şeyh Süleyman Efendi, Haffaf Mehmed Efendi Kadiri Tekkesi)
- Şeyh Ahmed Efendi Dergahı
- Himmetzade Bayrami Dergahı
- Fındıkzade Hacı Ahmed Efendi Dergahı
- Alaybeyi Tekkesi
- Ketenci Baba Tekkesi
- Rukiye Hatun Tekkesi
- Koruk Rifai (Abdullah, Şakir Efendi) Dergahı (Odabaşı, Koruk Tekkesi)
- Şeyh Raşid Efendi Sa’di Dergahı (İnadiye Salı Tekkesi)
- Hariri Mehmed Efendi Dergahı (Salih Efendi, Pazar Tekkesi)
- Ümmi Sinan Asitanesi (Zekaizade Tekkesi)
- Arpacı Tekkesi (Şamlı Hasan Efendi Sa’di Dergahı)
- Yavaşca Mehmed Ağa (Nazım Efendi) Dergahı
- Müneccim Sa’di Efendi Gülşeni Dergahı
- Gazi Kara Ahmed Paşa Zaviyesi
- Kıllı Yusuf Cumartesi (Berberler Şeyhi) Tekkesi (Berberler Şeyhi Seyyid Osman Efendi Rifai Dergahı)
- Çivizade Mehmed Efendi Dergahı
- Bedreddinzadeler Sünbüli Dergahı
- Hacı Kadın Halveti Dergahı
- Mirahur İlyas Bey Halveti Dergahı (Şeyh Vahyi Tekkesi)
- Hüseyin Ağa (Arabkuyusu) Tekkesi
- Şeyh Emin Kadiri Dergahı
- Halid Efendi Uşşaki Tekkesi
- Gümüş Baba (Taşçıbaşı, Şeyh İbrahim Efendi) Kadiri Tekkesi
- Kuledibi Dergahı
- Hamid Ağa Tekkesi
- Etyemez Mirza Baba Sünbüli Dergahı (Karabacak Veli Tekkesi)
- Kadem-i Şerif Sa’di Dergahı (Halil Hamid Paşa Tekkesi)
- Abdal Yakub Dede (Hekimoğlu Ali Paşa) Dergahı
- Lamekani (Hüseiyn Efendi) Zaviyesi
- Erdi Baba Dergahı
- Bebek Dede Dergahı
- Sünbül Efendi Asitanesi
- Nuh Efendi Tekkesi
- Kadı Efendi Ağaçkakan (Feyzi Efendi, Nail Efendi Bedevi) Dergahı
- Ağa Çayırı Safveti Sünbüli Dergahı (Ağaçayırı, Kasım Çavuş, Çayır Tekkesi)
- Ahmed Niyazi Efendi Dergahı
- Hacı Evhad Sünbüli Dergahı
- Feyziye (Küçük Efendi) Tekkesi (Feyzüddin Efendi Nakşi Dergahı)
- Ramazan Efendi Asitanesi (Bezirgah Hüsrev Çelebi Halveti Dergahı)
- Körükcü (Kürkçü) Tekke
- Öksüzce Baba Dergahı (Akarca Tekkesi)

== Zeytinburnu ==
- Merkez Efendi Sünbüli Dergahı
- Alemdar (Bayrak Dede Alemdar, Sancaktar) Zaviyesi
- Yenikapı Mevlevihanesi
- Duhani Mahmud Efendi Şaban Ağa Tekkesi
- Bayram Dede Tekkesi
- Seyyid Nizam Şabani Dergahı
- Arakıyeci İbrahim Efendi Halveti Dergahı
- Abdullah Baba Bektaşi Dergahı
- Perişan Ali Baba Zakirbaşı Dergahı

== Büyükçekmece ==
- Nasuhi Dede Tekkesi

== Beyoğlu ==
- Gül Baba Dergahı
- Tomtom Mescidi Tekkesi
- Galata Mevlevihanesi
- Okçu Baba (Musa Baba) Dergahı
- Mustafa Efendi Bedevi Dergahı
- Paşa Baba (Hocazade Rufai) Dergahı
- İsmail Rumi Kadiri Asitanesi
- Karabaş Mustafa Ağa Dergahı
- Hasan Burhaneddin Cihangiri Asitanesi
- Kurşunlu Mahzen Zaviyesi
- Nebati Efendi Kadiri Dergahı
- Ali Dede Tekkesi
- Tatar Efendi Gülşeni Dergahı
- Çavuşbaşı Tekkesi
- İlyas Çelebi Akarca Zaviyesi
- Keşfi Cafer Efendi Dergahı (Nebi Efendi Tekkesi)
- Canfeda Tekkesi
- Said Efendi Dergahı
- Ali Baba Ayaspaşa Tekkesi
- Hacı Kılıç Tekkesi
- Kantari Baba Sadiyye Dergahı
- Çizmeciler Tekkesi
- Çakır Dede Nakşi Zaviyesi (Karaabalı Tekkesi)
- Okçular Tekkesi
- Sinan Paşa Tekkesi
- Hamdi Efendi Dergahı
- Kasımpaşa Mevlevihanesi
- Ayni Ali Baba Kadiri Zaviyesi
- Seki (Gülşen) Dede Tekkesi
- Ahmed Safai Efendi (Yanık Şeyh) Tekkesi
- Piyale Paşay-ı Kebir Kadiri Dergahı
- Muabbir Hasan Efendi Kadiri (Arabacılar) Dergahı
- Turabi Baba Dergahı
- Ciğerim Dede Sadi Dergahı
- Ali Efendi Arabzade Mustafa Efendi Bedevi Dergahı (Şeyh Mustafa Tekkesi)
- Şeyh Cevheri Sadi Dergahı
- Kalafatçı Yusuf (Hamdi Efendi) Tekkesi
- Yahya Kethuda (Kasım Çavuş Halveti, Yusuf Çavuş ve Yahya Baba) Dergahı
- Piyale-i Sağır Kurt Bey Kadiri Zaviyesi
- Divanhane Dergahı
- Eburrıza Mehmed Efendi Dergahı
- Doğramacı Dergahı (Badula Tekkesi)
- Muarrifi Rifai Dergahı
- Ali Kuzu (Bedreddin) Tekkesi (Çürüklük Dergahı)
- Haşimi Osman Efendi Bayrami Dergahı (Emir Efendi Tekkesi)
- Hüsameddin Uşşaki Asitanesi
- Mehmed Çavuş Tekkesi
- Turşucu Tekkesi
- Zincirli Tekkesi
- Çıksalın Tekkesi (Çıksalın Kadiri Dergahı)
- Abdüsselam Efendi Dergahı (Fıstıklı, Taşcı Tekkesi)
- İshak Karamani (Uyuni) Tekkesi
- Hasirizade Sadi Dergahı
- Münir Baba Dergahı (Bademli Tekke)(Caferabad, Şahkulu ve Şeyh Murad-ı Buhari Nakşi Zaviyesi)

== Kağıthane ==
- Karaağaç Bektaşi Dergahı
- Abdüssamed Efendi Bayrami Dergahı
- Yeniçeriler Tekkesi
- Tahta Kadı Zaviyesi

== Beşiktaş ==
- Mehmed Niyazi Efendi Kadiri Dergahı
- Durmuş Dede Dergahı
- Şeyh Zafiri Dergahı
- Ebulhüda Dergahı (Sayyadiye Tekkesi)
- Beşiktaş Mevlevihanesi
- Neccarzade Nakşi Tekkesi
- Ahmed Turani Sungur Baba Nakşi Zaviyesi
- Muhyiddin Efendi Şabani Zaviyesi (Şeyh İhsan Efendi, Maçka Tekkesi)
- Yahya Efendi Nakşi Dergahı

== Sarıyer ==
- Tezveren Baba Dergahı
- Nalbant Mehmed Efendi Nakşi Dergahı (Nalburi Tekkesi)
- Karabaş Halveti Dergahı
- Nafi Baba Bektaşi (Şehidlik) Tekkesi
- Haffaf Hüseyin Efendi Kadiri Dergahı
- İsmail Efendi Halveti (Raufi) Dergahı
- Sarı Baba Nakşi Dergahı

== Beykoz ==
- Akbaba Dergahı
- Yuşa Tepesi Nakşibendi Dergahı
- Şeyh Kadir Efendi Nakşibendi Tekkesi (Serviburnu Tekkesi)
- Serbostani (Mehmed Kethüda Halveti) Tekkesi
- Çayır (Şeyh Edhem Sırrı Efendi) Tekkesi
- Şeyh Ahmed Efendi Bedevi Dergahı
- Hafız Efendi (Mehmed Tevfik Efendi, Şamiler) Tekkesi
- Şabani Dergahı
- Ubeydullah Efendi Nakşibendi Tekkesi
- Ataullah Efendi Nekşibendi Dergahı
- Nazif Dede Nakşi Dergahı (Anadoluhisarı Tekkesi)

== Üsküdar ==
- Fatma Adaviyye Dergahı (Şeyh Ahmet Efendi Bedevi Tekkesi)
- Mustafa İzzet Efendi Settariye Dergahı (Şeyh Hamil, Abdullah Ağa Tekkesi)
- Şeyh Nevruz Tekkesi (Kadiri Afgan Kalenderhanesi)(Havuzbaşı Özbekler Tekkesi)
- İstavroz Bedevi Kalenderhanesi (Şeyh Hüseyin Hıfzı Efendi Dergahı)(Beylerbeyi Bedevi Tekkesi)
- Kazım Efendi Tekkesi
- Yarımca Dede Baba Dergahı
- Selami Ali Efendi Asitanesi
- Musalla Dergahı
- Nur Baba Bektaşi Dergahı
- Özbekler Tekkesi (Hacı Hoca Nakşi Dergahı)
- Mihrimah Sultan Zeviyesi (Şeyh Celaleddin Efendi Rifai Tekkesi)
- Toygartepe (Saçlı Hüseyin Efendi) Dergahı
- Selim Baba Nakşi Dergahı (Şeyh Sadık Efendi Tekkesi)
- Feyzullah Efendi Kalenderhanesi
- Selami Ali Efendi Selamiye Dergahı
- Selami Ali Efendi Acıbadem Dergahı
- Şeyh Devati Dergahı
- Balaban Tekkesi
- Aziz Mahmud Hüdai Asitanesi (Aziz Mahmud Hüdai Bacılar Celveti Tekkesi)
- Halil Paşa Zaviyesi (Kapıcı Tekkesi)
- Üsküdar Mevlevihanesi
- Ayşe Sultan Tekkesi
- Nasuhi Mehmed Efendi Asitanesi
- Safvet Efendi Şabani Dergahı (Ahmed Paşa, Kaz Deresi Tekkesi)
- Etmek Yemez Bayrami Dergahı
- Raufi Efendi Asitanesi
- Selimiye Hankahı
- Hafız İsmail Efendi Dergahı
- Miskinler Tekkesi
- Keşfi Ahmed Efendi Dergahı
- Avni Efendi Kadiri Dergahı
- Himmet Efendi Asitanesi (Himmetzade Salı Dergahı)
- Kıncı Baba Tekkesi
- Mehmed Arif Dede Dergahı (Kapıağa Tekkesi)
- Kurban Nasuh Rifai Dergahı (Nuri Efendi, Çarşamba Tekkesi)
- Hallaç Baba Sa’di Dergahı
- Atpazari Osman Efendi Dergahı
- İbrahim Edhem Efendi Dergahı (Sandıkçı Tekkesi)
- Karabaş Veli Asitanesi
- Kavsara Mustafa Efendi Halveti Dergahı
- Acıbadem Dergahı
- Çamlıcalı Mehmed Efendi Dergahı (Çınarlı Tekke)
- Seyfeddin Efendi Sa’di Dergahı
- Hacı Dede Nakşi (Sadık Efendi) Dergahı
- Kartal Baba Kadiri Dergahı
- Fenai Ali Efendi Asitanesi
- Ümmi Ahmed Efendi Şabani Dergahı
- Afganlar Kalenderhanesi (Numan Bey Tekkesi)
- Hasib Efendi Bedevi Dergahı
- Balcı Dede Dergahı
- Nalçacı Halil Efendi Şabani Dergahı (Tului Tekkesi)
- Halim Gülüm Kadiri Dergahı (Zincirlikuyu Tekkesi)
- Feyzullah Efendi Dergahı
- Abdullah Efendi Nakşi Dergahı (Şeyh Selim Tekkesi)
- Tombul Mehmed Efendi Tekkesi (Tombul Mehmed Efendi Halveti Dergahı)
- Külhancı Baba Dergahı
- Ahmed Sıtkı Efendi Tekkesi
- Saçlı Hüseyin Efendi (Şah Nurullah, Şeyh Nurullah) Dergahı
- Ahmediye Rifai Dergahı
- Şemseddin Efendi Tekkesi
- Feyzullah Efendi Dergahı (Rumi Efendi Tekkesi)
- Şeyh Fethi Sa’di Dergahı
- İskender Baba Kaymakçı Tekkesi
- Yusuf Rıza Efendi Rifai Asitanesi
- Haşim Baba Asitanesi (Bandırmalı Yusuf Nizam Dergahı)
- Osman Efendi Tekkesi
- Bali Çavuş Zaviyesi
- Karaca Ahmet Sultan Tekkesi
- Acemler Dergahı
- Sarıgazi Zaviyesi

== Kadıköy ==
- Gözcü Baba Ribatı
- Şahkulu Dergahı
- Abdulhalim Efendi Dergahı
- Ayşe Sıddıka Hanım Mecidiye (Abdulbaki Efendi, Kuşdili Hamidiye Sa’di) Dergahı
- İbrahim Ağa Mustafa Efendi Kadiri Dergahı

== Kartal ==
- Ali Sabit Efendi Rifai Muarrifi Dergahı
- Mustafa Ağa Kadiri Dergahı (Yakacık Tekkesi)
- Halveti Mustafa Efendi Dergahı (Vezir Tekkesi)
- Daver Baba Tekkesi
