= Sidi Kacem El Jellizi Mausoleum =

Zawiya in Tunis, Tunisia

Coordinates: 36°47′37″N 10°09′49″E

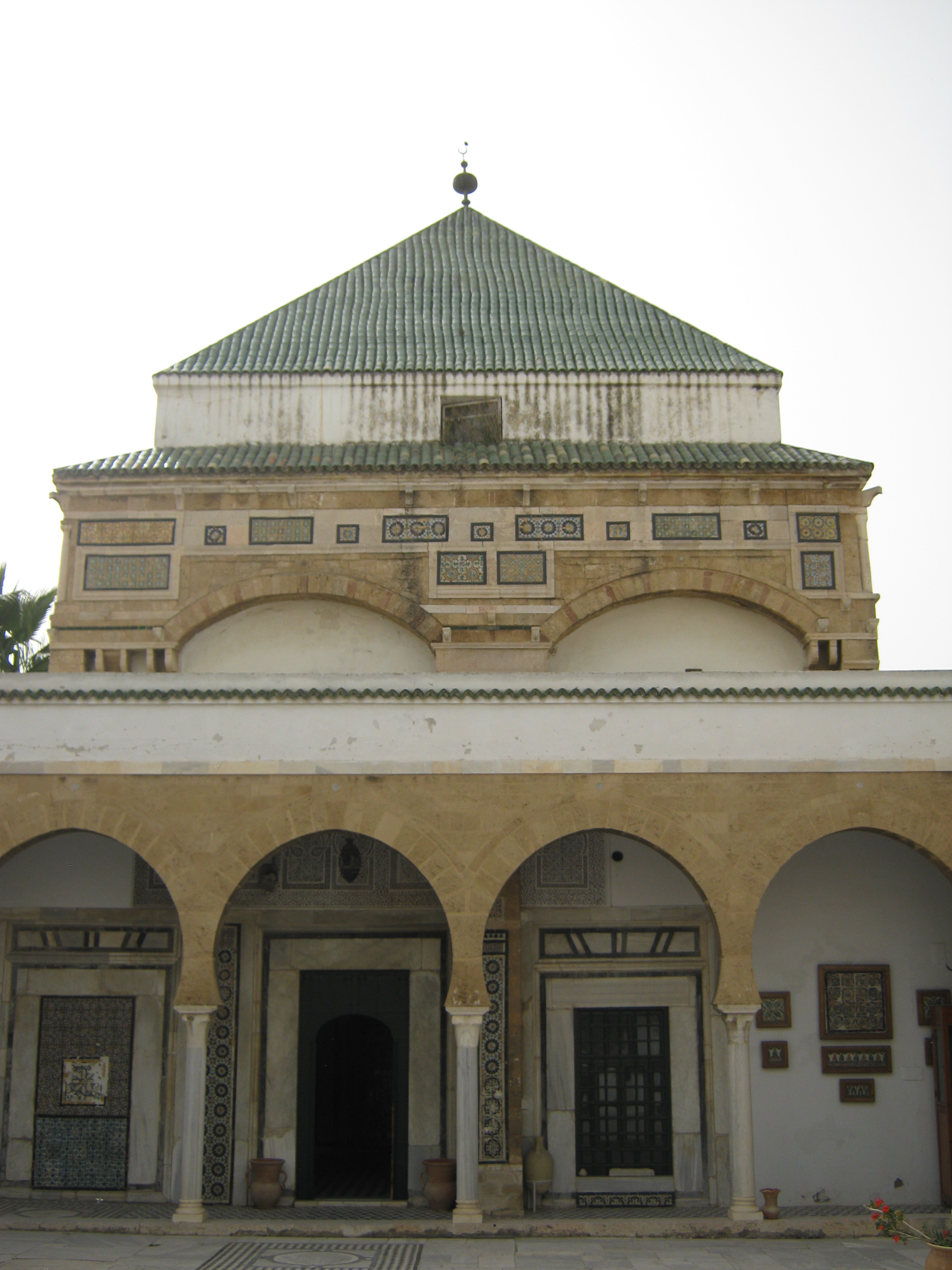
Facade of the mausoleum Sidi Kacem El Jellizi

The Sidi Kacem El Jellizi Mausoleum (زاوية سيدي قاسم الجليزي) is a zawiya located on the edge of the medina of Tunis in Tunisia.

== Story ==
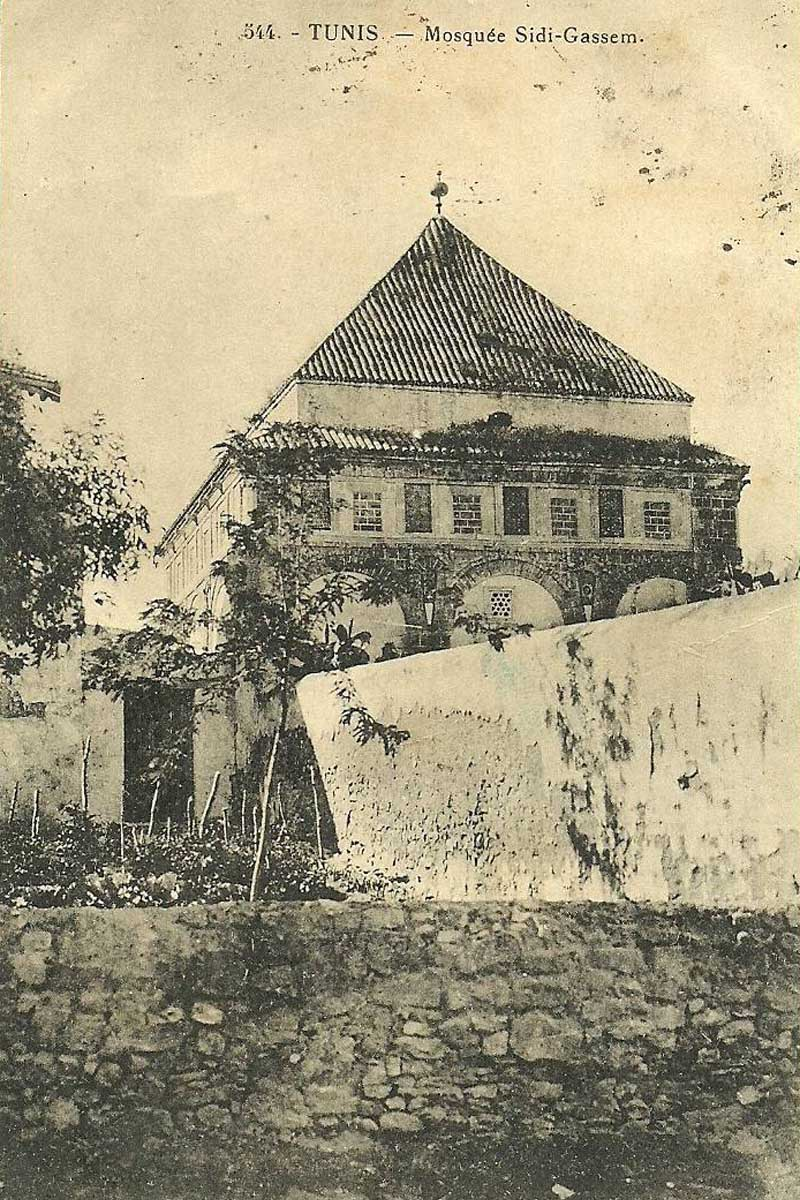
View of the mausoleum in 1890

Built during the second half of the 15th century on a hill overlooking the kasbah of Tunis, it was the home of Sidi Kacem El Jellizi, a Tunisian saint born into a family of Andalusian migrants who stayed in Fez before settling in Hafsid Ifriqiya. Nicknamed jellizi in reference to the craft of zellij manufacturing, which he practiced with great skill, he was known for his piety, benevolence, and generosity. The place served as a refuge for travelers and traders, as well as Andalusian refugees after the capture of Granada in 1492, which increased his standing with the Hafsid leaders and the veneration of the population. After his death in 1496, he was buried in the building, which was decorated by himself or by his spiritual and artistic followers.

Subsequently, the zawiya was enlarged twice: first in the 17th century with the addition of a courtyard surrounded by rooms, and then in the 18th century with the addition of a prayer room under the reign of al-Husayn I ibn Ali.

== Architecture ==
The monument has a pyramidal dome covered with green tiles, with a carved wooden ceiling inside. Access to the building is through a double-leafed door topped by a lintel with finely worked keys. The interior is divided into two parts, of which one houses the burial of the saint and the other houses those of Hafsid sultans. The main façade is partially covered by zellij.

The patio is distinguished by a paving in white marble encrusted with black marble; it is framed by porticos which each have five broken oversized arches made of stone paired with ocher shellstone. The arches rest on columns of white marble whose capitals are Hafsid or Hispano-Moorish. The hypostyle-type prayer room is divided into three naves parallel to the wall of the qibla. The whole building, including the zawiya and its outbuildings, covers a total area of almost 2,700 square metres (29,000 sq ft).

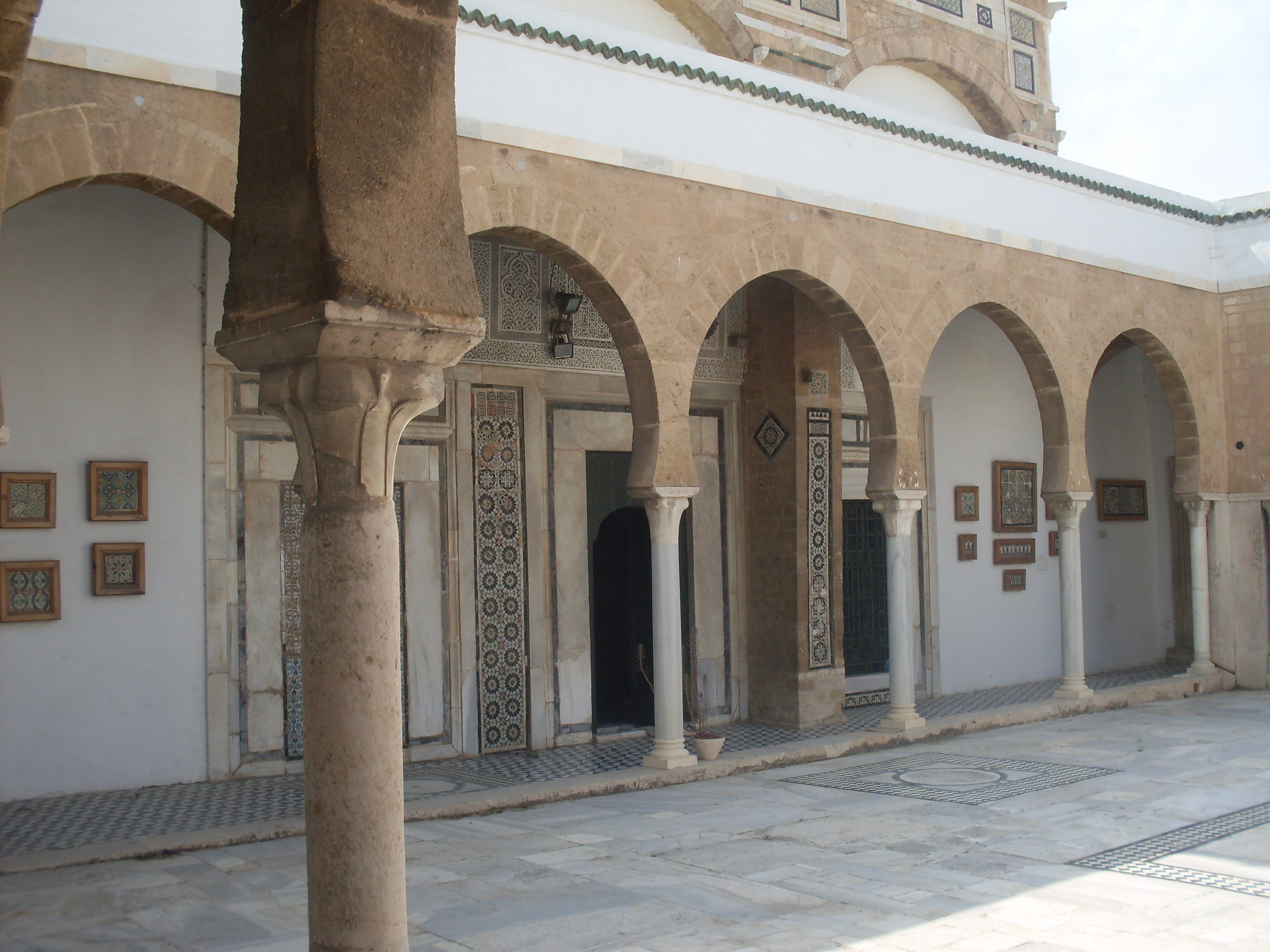
Court of the mausoleum

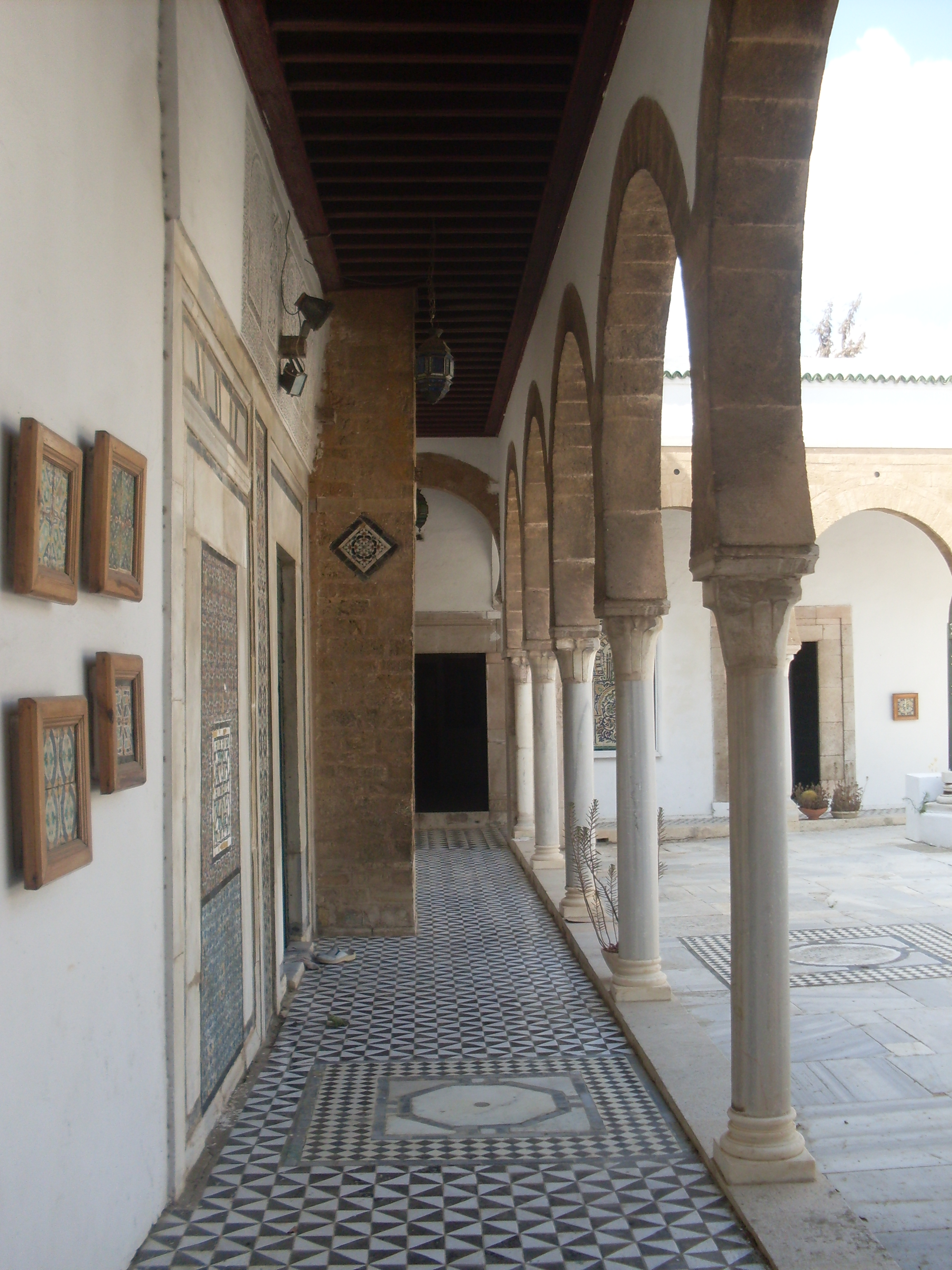
View of one of the porticos of the courtyard

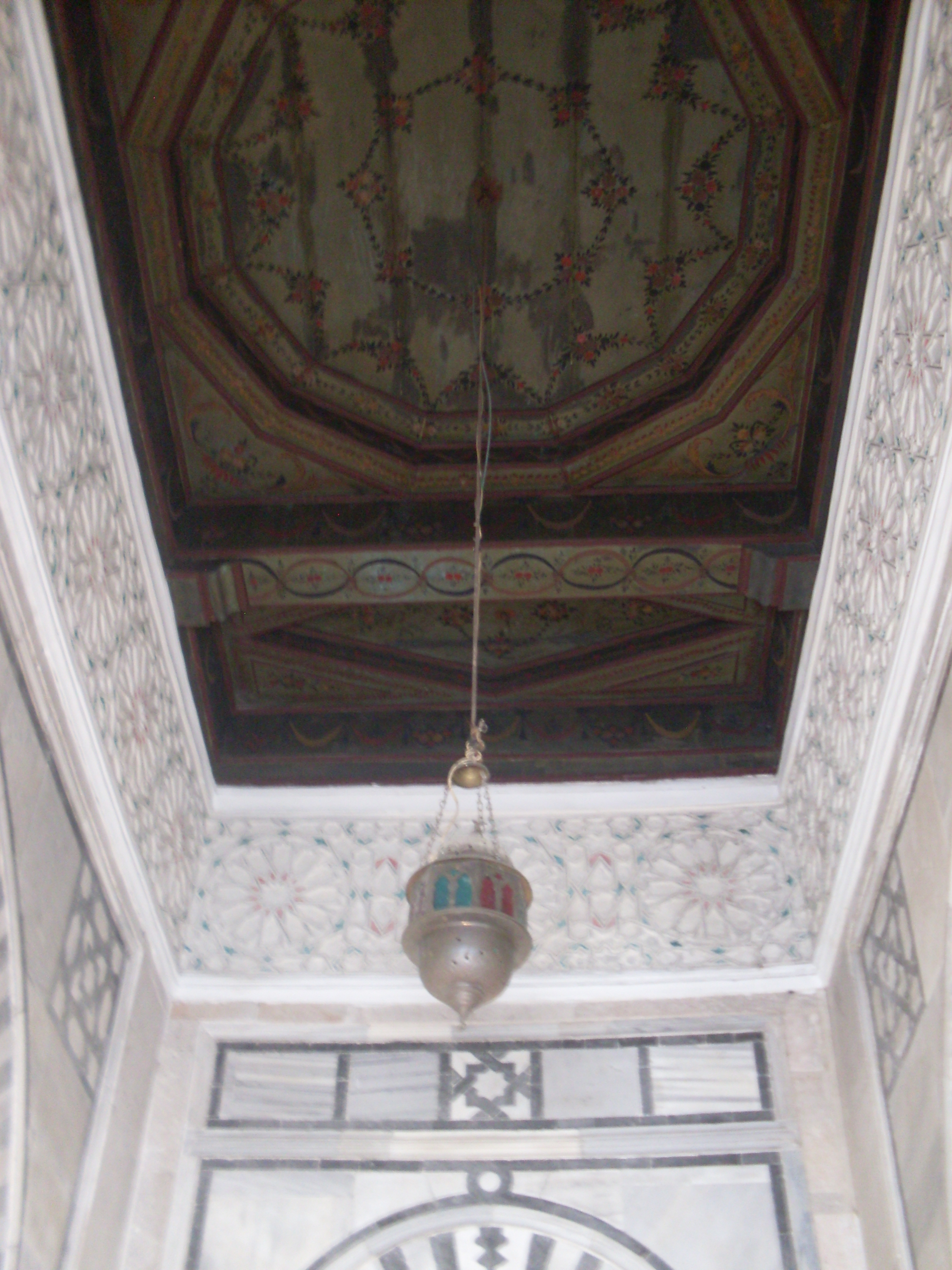
Ceiling in painted wood

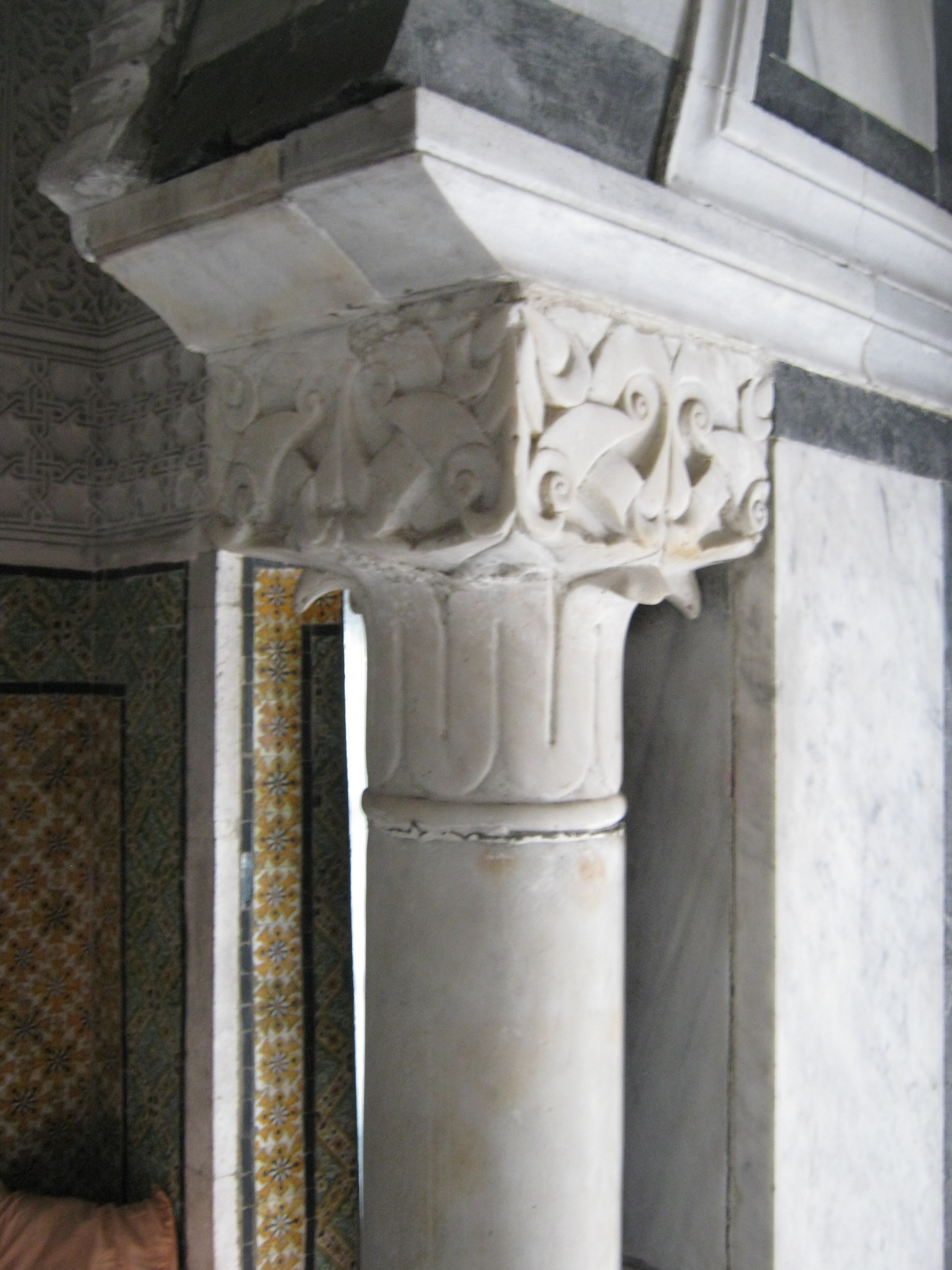
Decoration of capitals

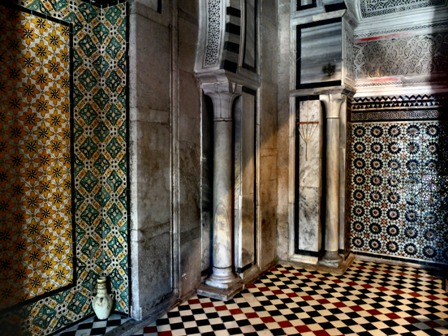
Earthenware of the mausoleum

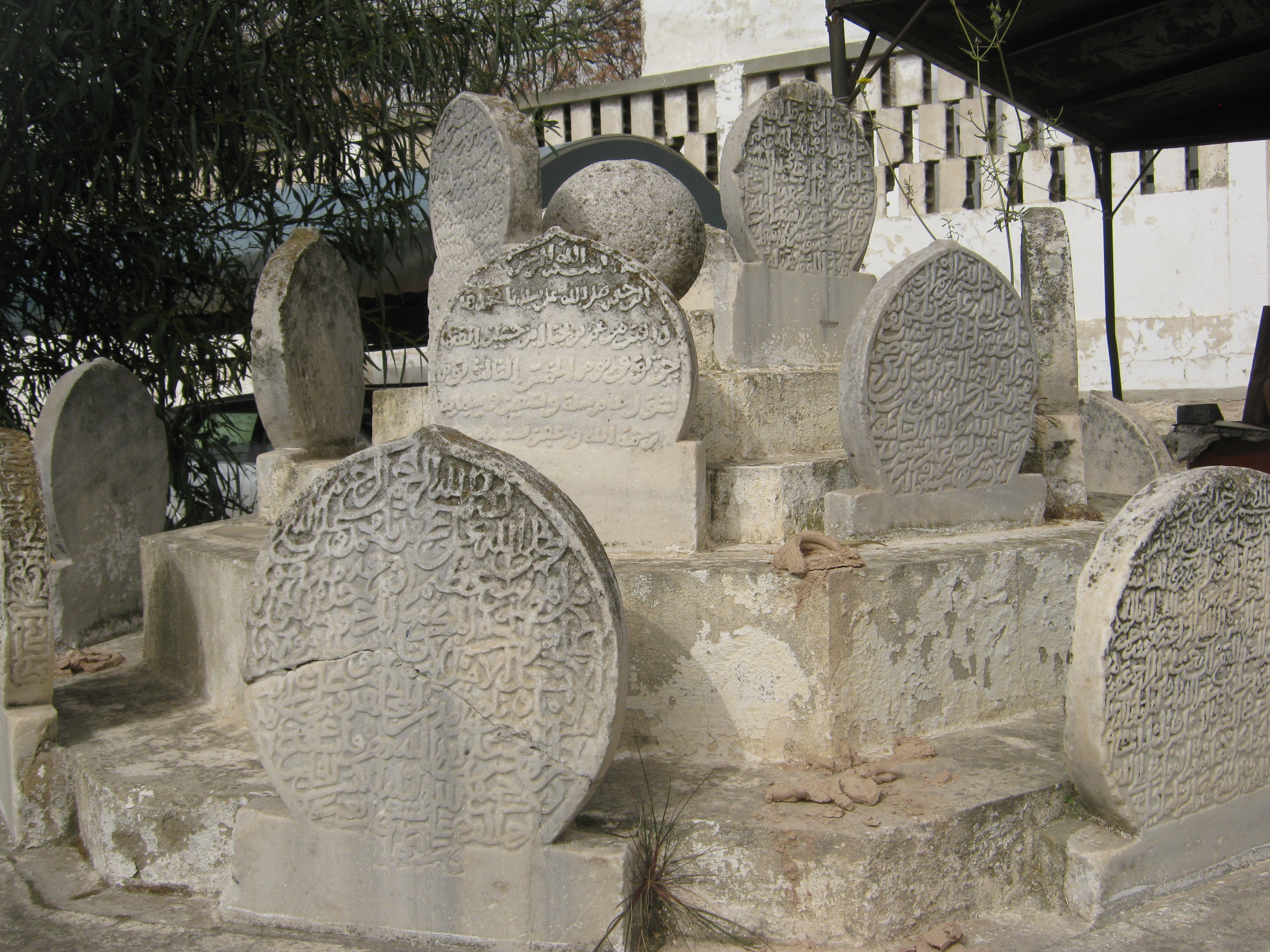
Calligraphy on graves

== Museum ==
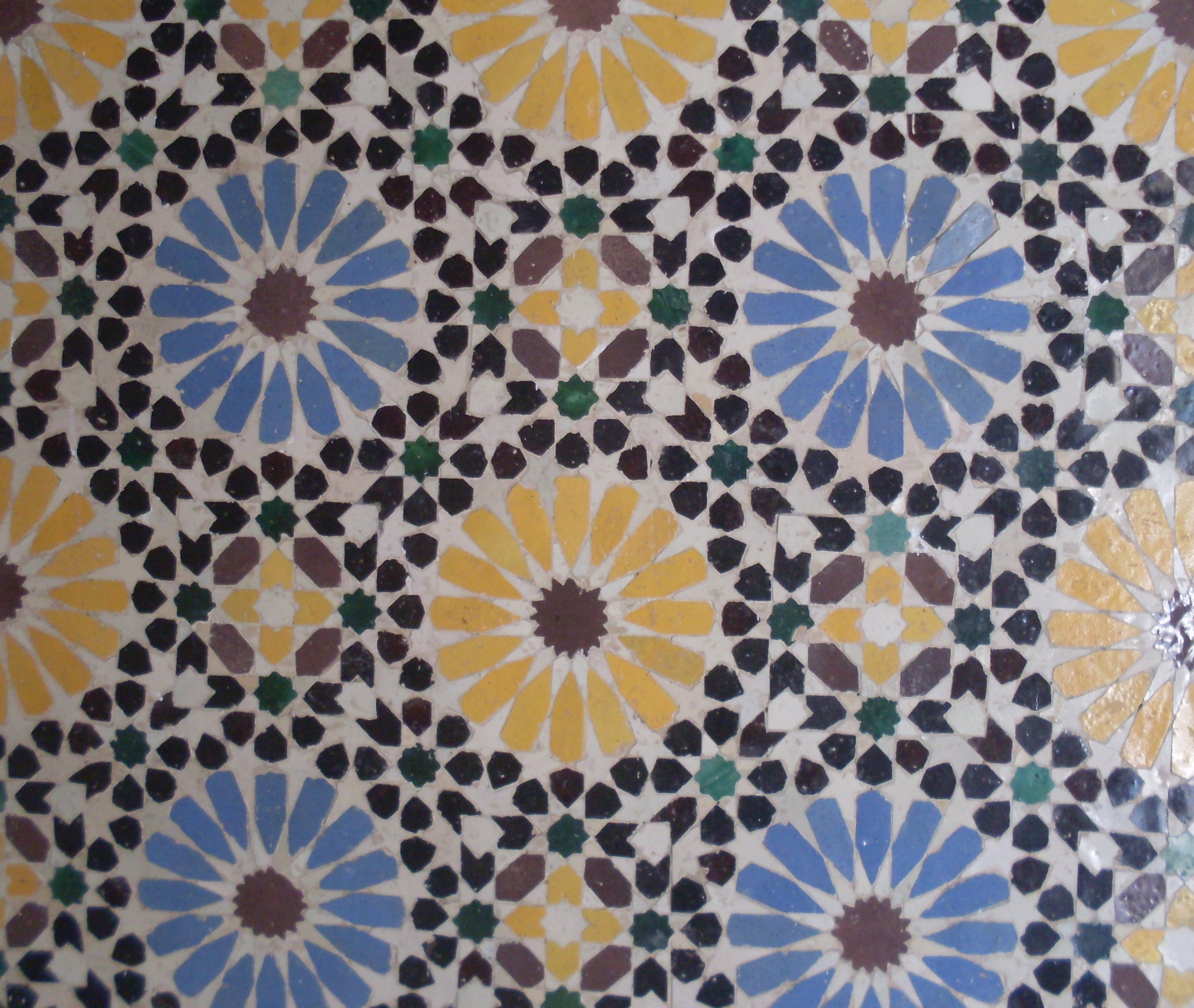
Example of faience presented at the museum

The zawiya is home to the National Center of Ceramics (inaugurated in 1992), a museum with a collection of ceramics and earthenware, both local and imported (e.g., fine examples of blue earthenware from the Ottoman Empire), as well as ancient Islamic funerary steles.

Remarkable pieces include a Hafsid ceramic from the kasbah of Raqqada and examples of Qallaline craftsmanship.
