= Zawiya of Sidi Sahib =

Religious monument in Kairouan, Tunisia

Coordinates: 35°40′56″N 10°05′25″E

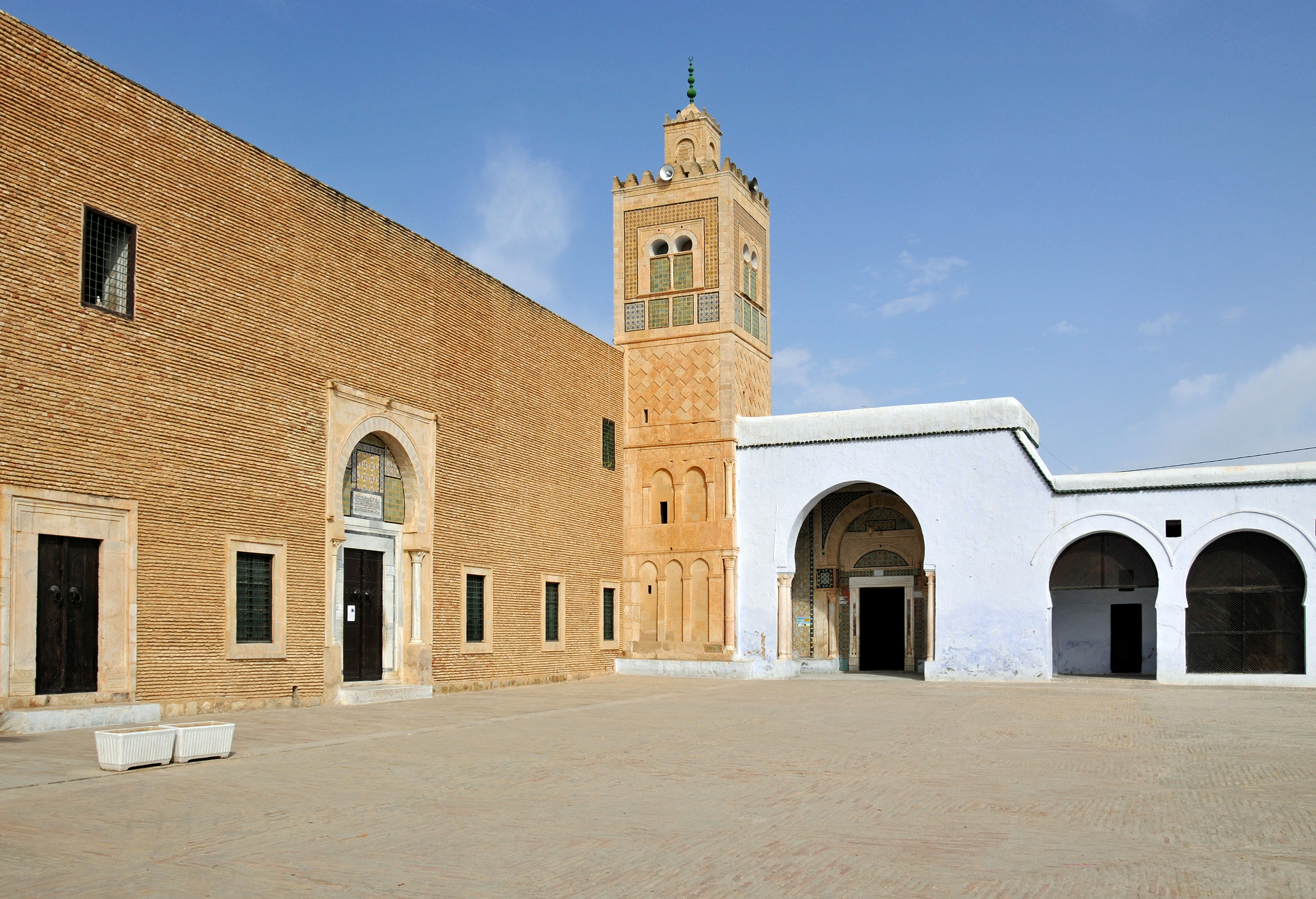
View of the Zawiya's outer courtyard, with the entrance to the mausoleum (center right), the minaret (center), and the entrance to the madrasa (left)

The Zawiya of Sidi Sahib, also known as the Zawiya of Abu al-Balawi or Mosque of the Barber, is a zawiya (religious shrine and complex) in Kairouan, Tunisia. Its origins date to the early era of the city's history, but the current complex largely dates to a major renovation and expansion in the 17th century. It is one of the most important religious sites in the city.

== History ==
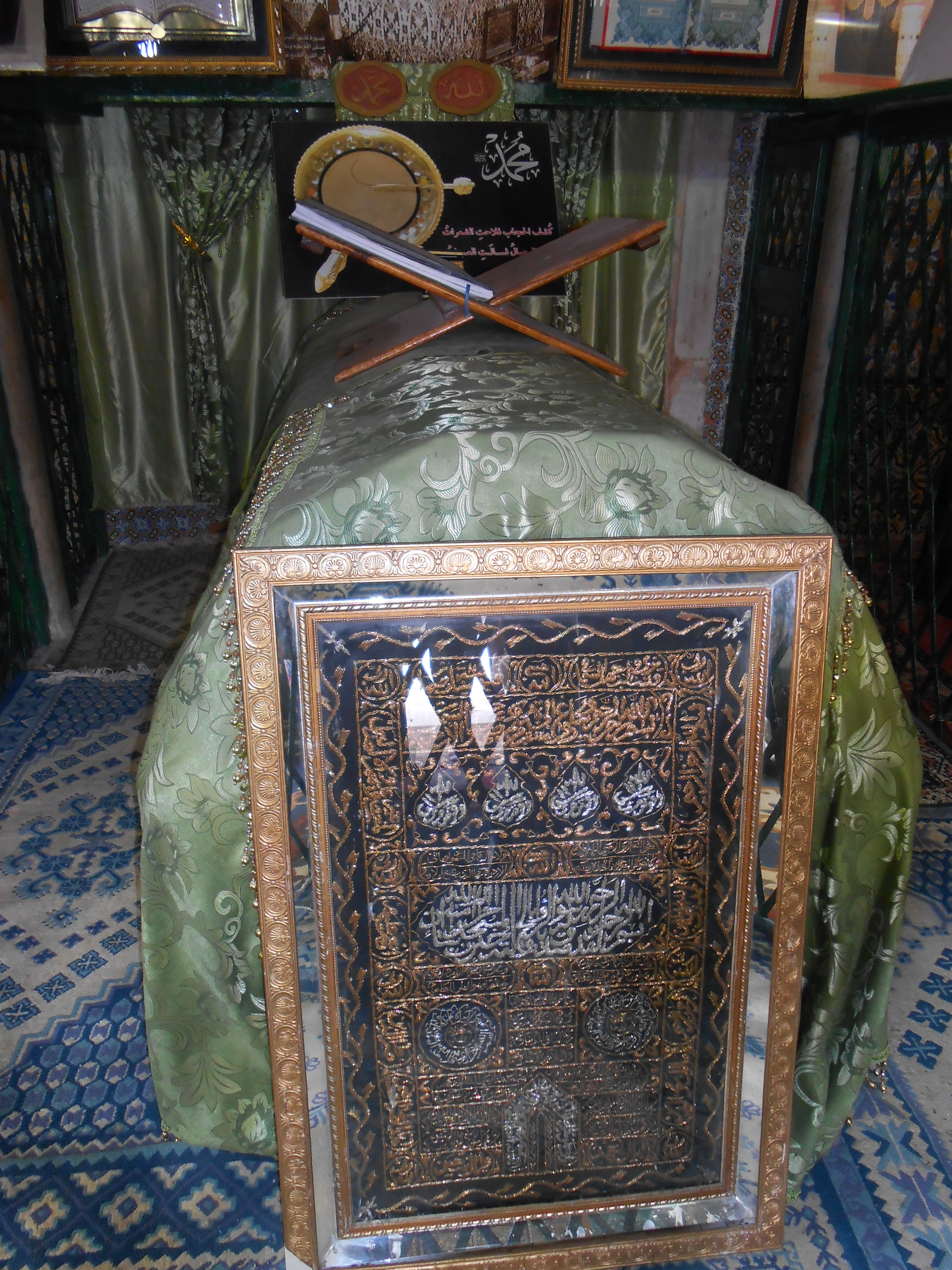
The cenotaph over the tomb of Abu Zama'a al-Balawi today

According to tradition, Abu Zama'a al-Balawi (also known as Sidi Sahib), the barber and a Companion of the Islamic prophet Muhammad, was buried here in 654 after dying in battle. Tradition also holds that he was buried with three hairs from Muhammad's beard. Today, he is also considered the town's patron saint.

By the 11th century, the tomb had become a pilgrimage site and a cemetery developed around it. By the 14th century, it was considered one of the most important shrines in Kairouan. A first zawiya or mausoleum was first built here in the 14th century over the site of the tomb. In the 15th century, the mausoleum is described as a simple structure covered by a dome with an octagonal base.

The current building dates largely to a series of constructions in the 17th century. Hammuda Pasha (d.1666), the Bey of Tunis and a member of the Muradid dynasty, began a major restoration and expansion of the mausoleum in 1629. This work rebuilt the mausoleum, added rooms to accommodate pilgrims and to house staff, and added a prayer hall (mosque). Another Muradid bey, Muhammad ibn Murad (r. 1675–1696), sponsored the renovation of the mausoleum's dome between 1681 and 1685 and the addition of a minaret and a madrasa between 1690 and 1695. The complex has undergone further restoration and reconstruction in modern times, though it preserves some of its 17th-century features. The dome of the mausoleum itself was renovated in the late 19th century.

== Architecture ==
The zawiya consists of several components: the mausoleum, the madrasa, and a warehouse surmounted by apartments. The architectural details of the complex are a mix of styles including western Hispano-Moorish or Andalusi tradition, Italian features from the Renaissance tradition, and the local tradition of construction in Kairouan. One of the features that is characteristic of the 17th century is the use of underglaze-painted Qallalin tiles to decorate many of its walls. These tiles, produced in the eponymous district of Tunis, are painted with vases, plants, and arches in predominantly blue, green, and ochre-like yellow colours. This tilework is especially visible in the mausoleum section. The upper walls are typically decorated with carved stucco employing geometric motifs and stylized trees. The columns and the window frames are made of imported Italian white marble.

The complex is entered through a doorway that leads to a large outer courtyard, surrounded by porticos where horses could. A main gate is situated in the western corner to access the mausoleum. This gate is framed by white and red marble. On the left of this gate is the warehouse, which was used to house the zawiya's possessions and supplies, provided for by its habus (waqf) endowment. Above the warehouse is a series of apartments which were historically used to receive tax officials and important guests.

Next to the warehouse and the mausoleum sections is the madrasa. It consists of two small courtyards surrounded by porticos leading to the cells or sleeping quarters of students. One of the courtyards leads to a small hypostyle prayer hall composed of two naves (aisles divided by columns). The minaret of the madrasa rises next to the mausoleum's gate in the outer courtyard.

The madrasa

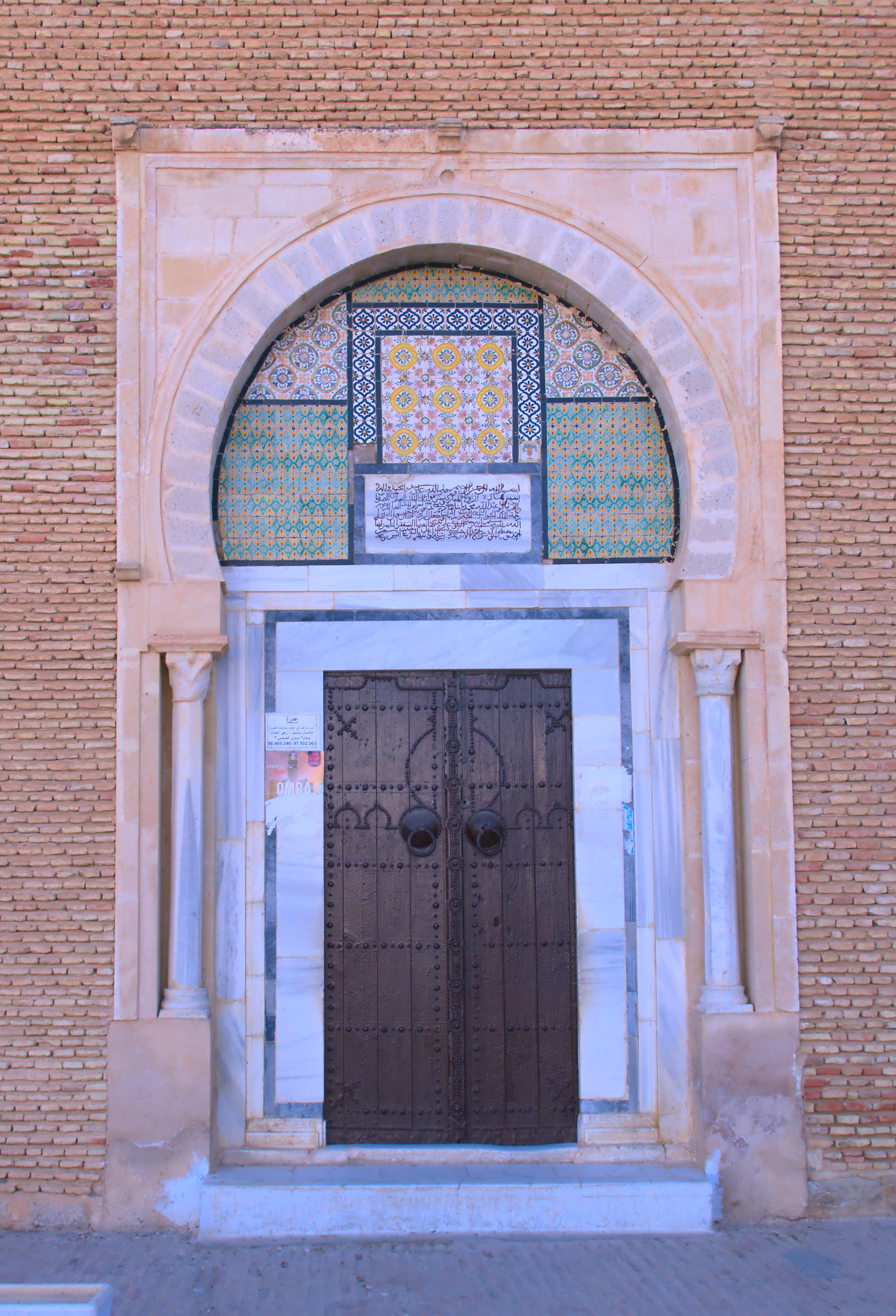
The doorway to the madrasa from the outer courtyard

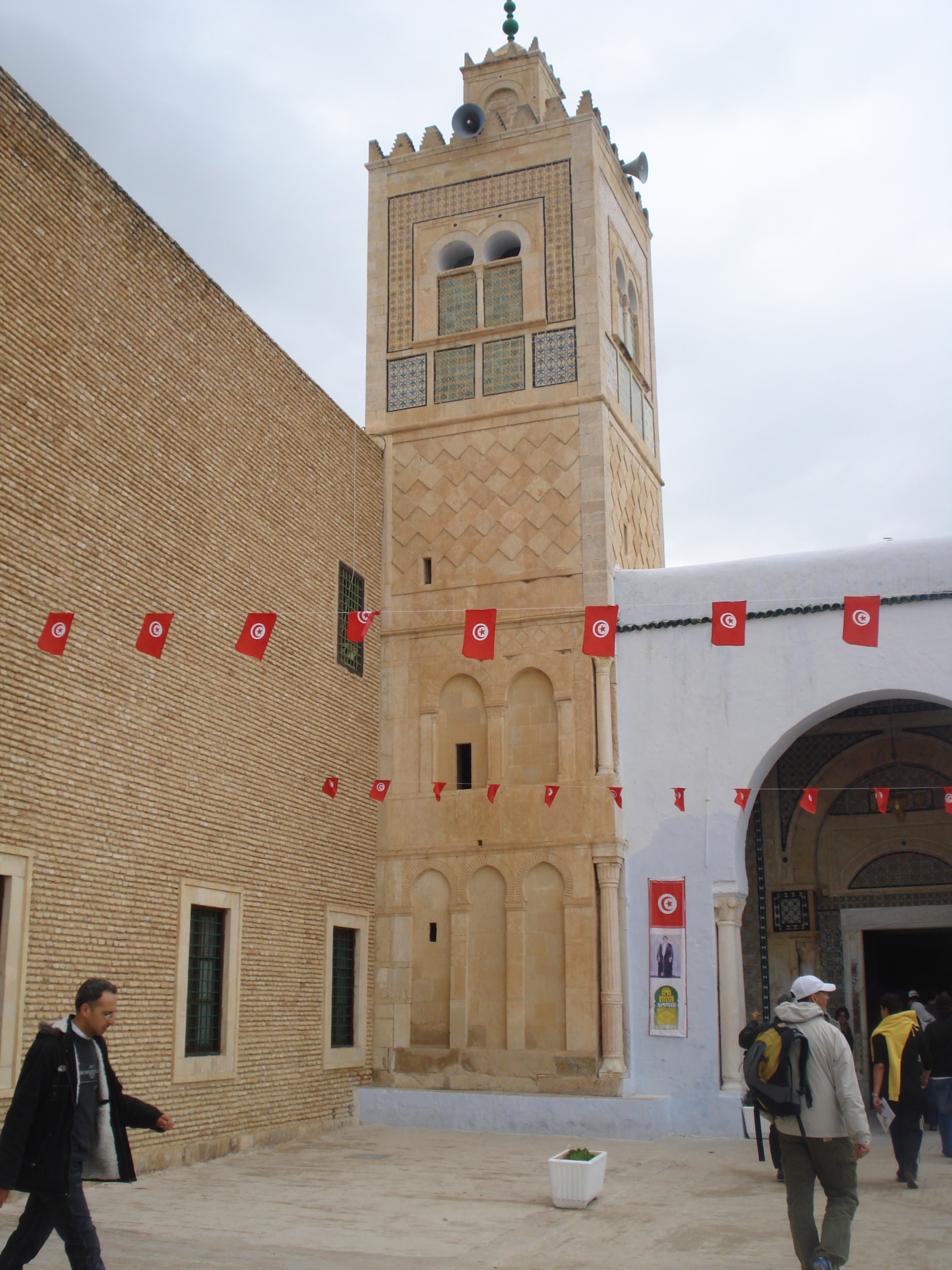
The minaret

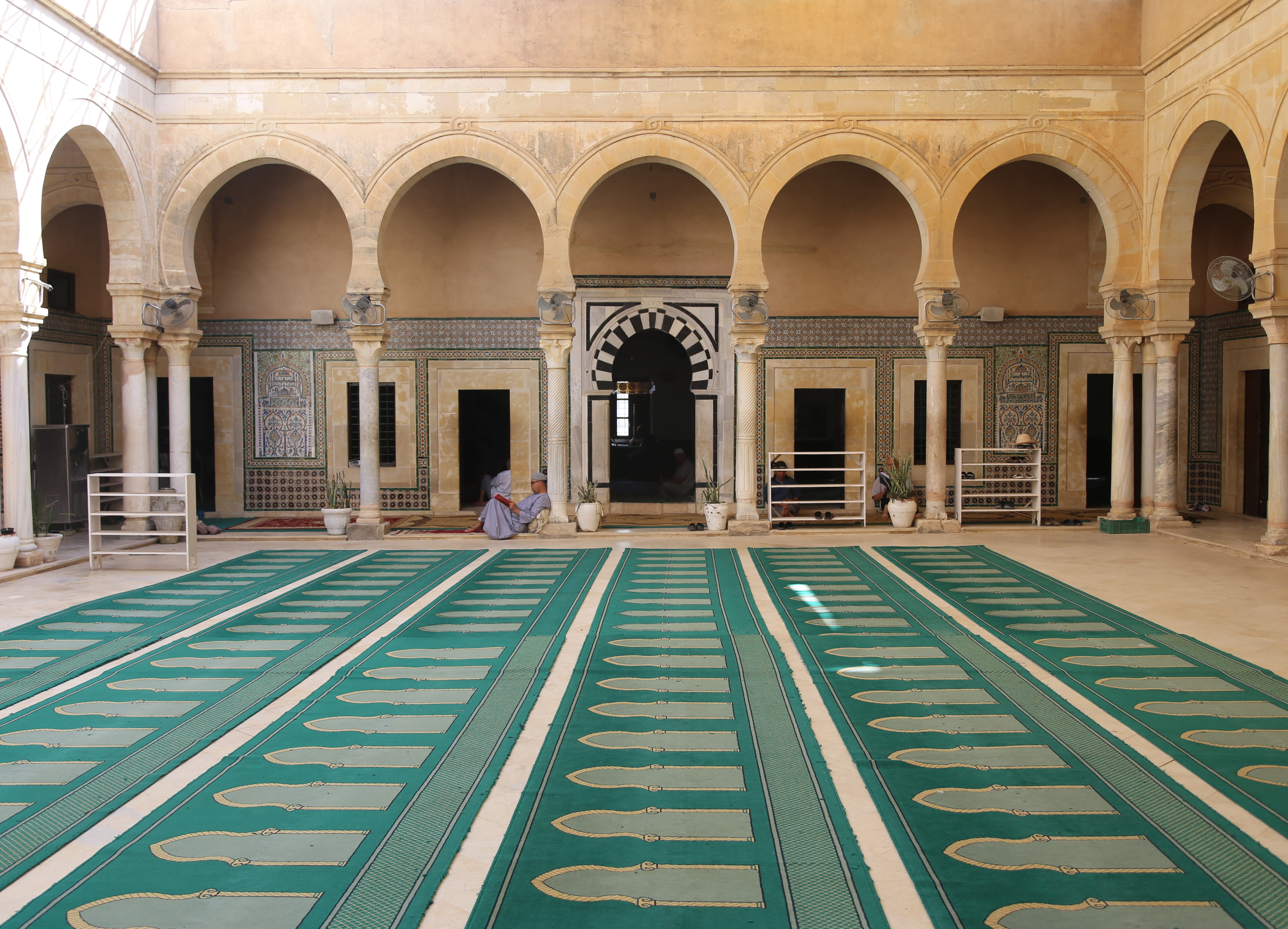
The main courtyard of the madrasa

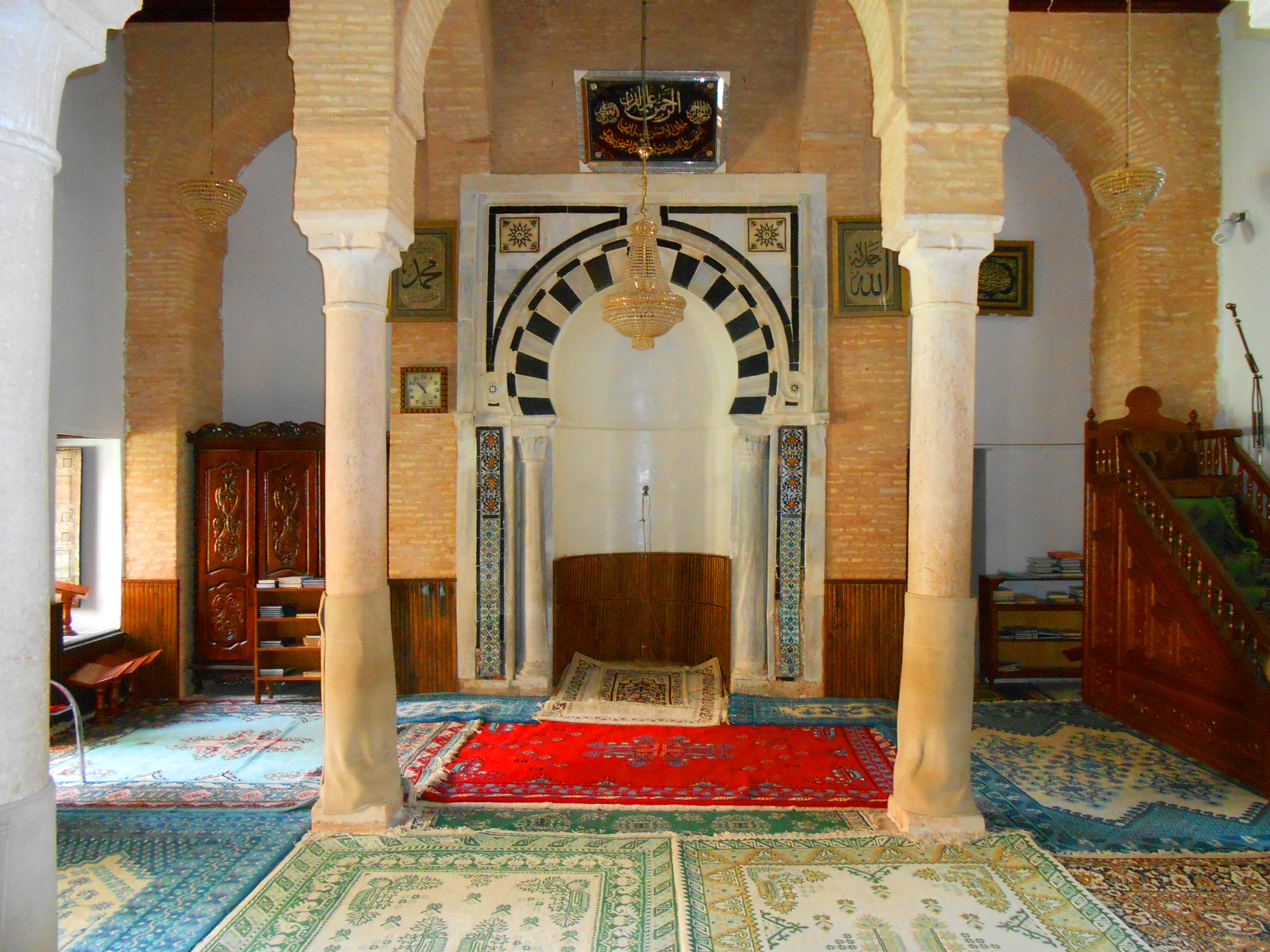
The prayer hall of the madrasa, looking towards the mihrab

From the gate in the outer courtyard, the mausoleum is reached via a bent entrance leading to a corridor that is open to the sky in the middle and flanked by covered porticos on either side. The porticos have horseshoe arches supported on columns with Corinthian-like capitals. This corridor leads to a chamber covered by a dome with four squinches, which then leads to a second courtyard. This second courtyard lies in front of the mausoleum chamber, which is covered by another dome with squinches.

The mausoleum

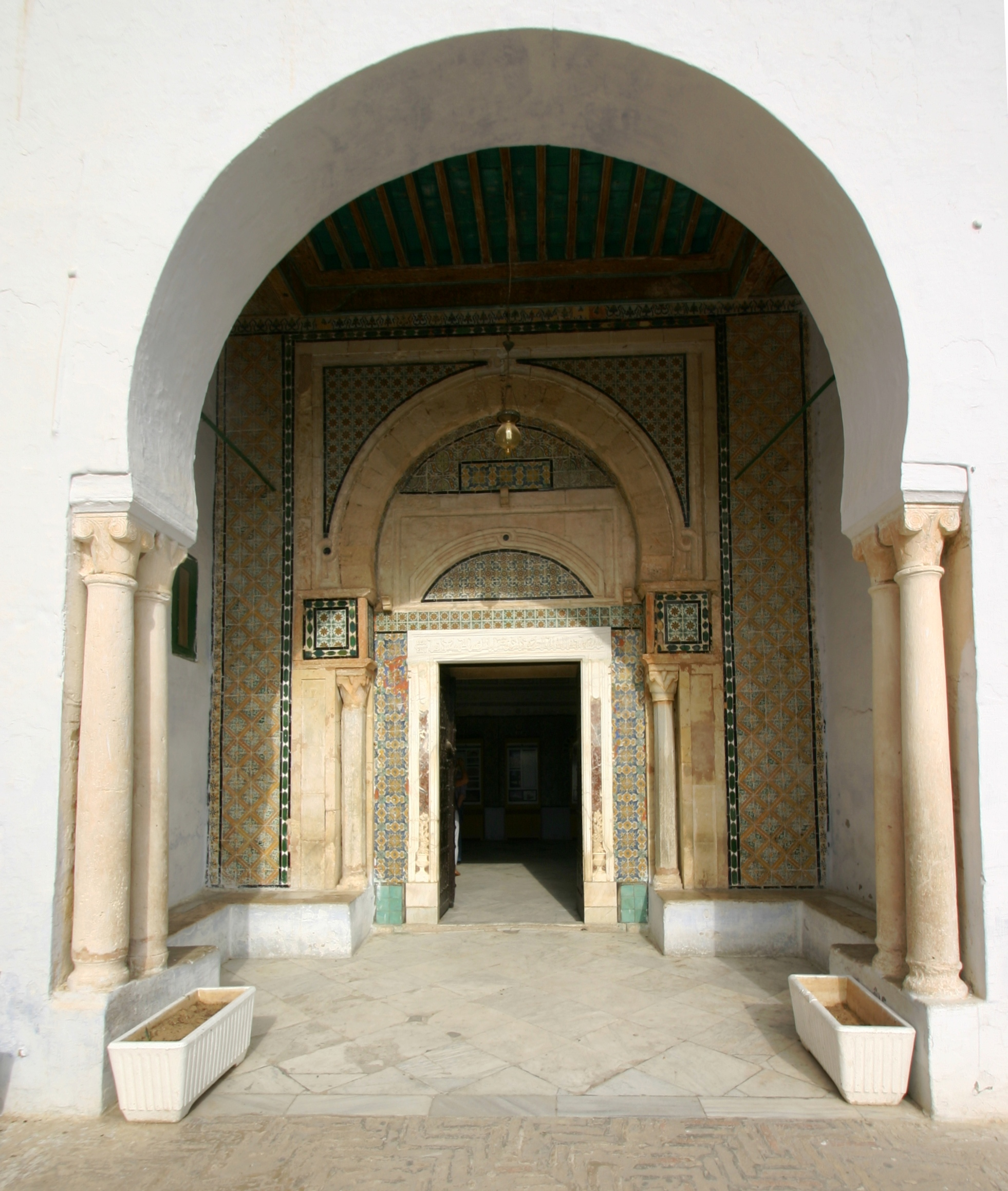
The entrance to the mausoleum from the outer courtyard

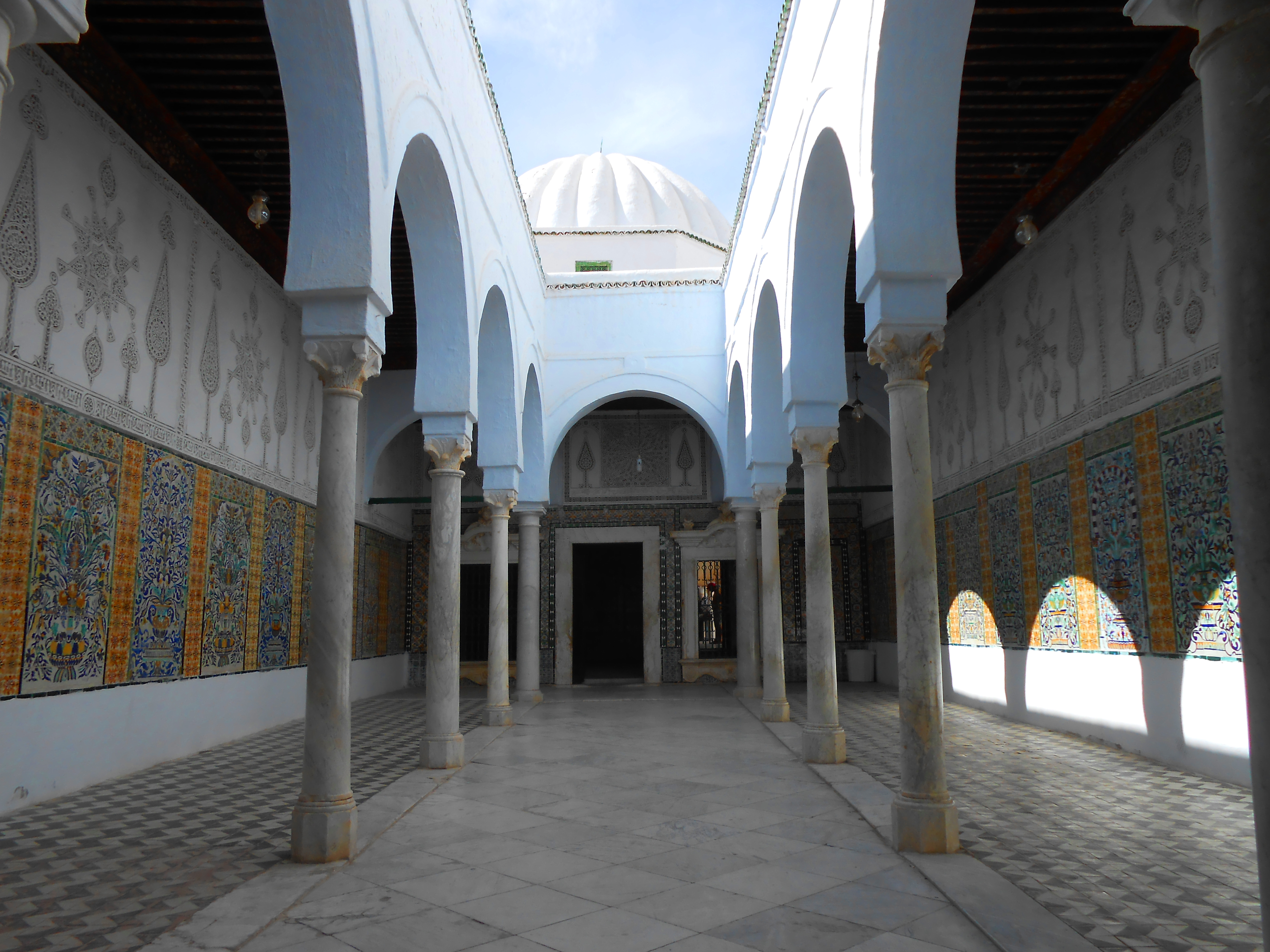
Vestibule corridor leading into the mausoleum

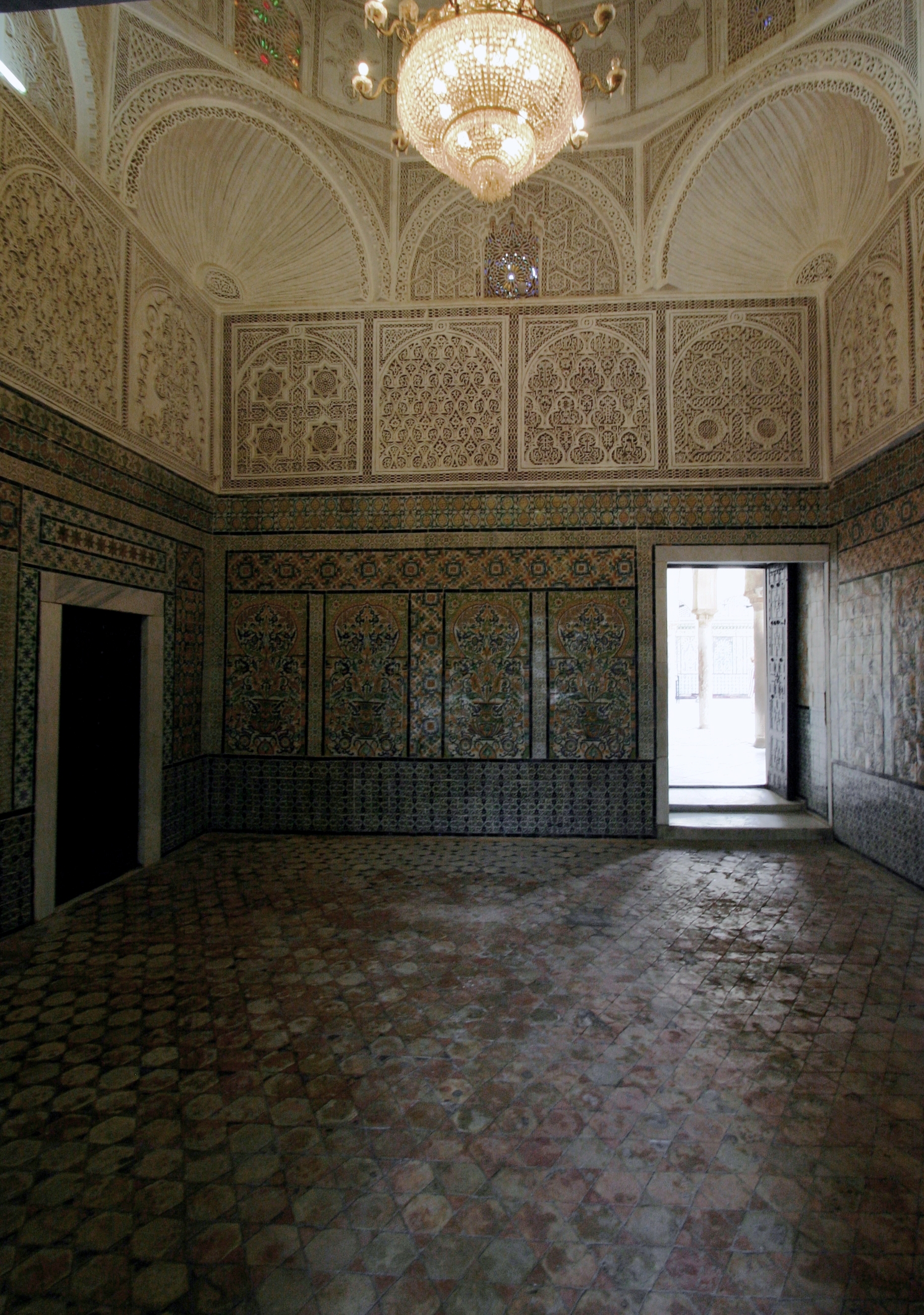
Domed chamber between the vestibule and the second courtyard

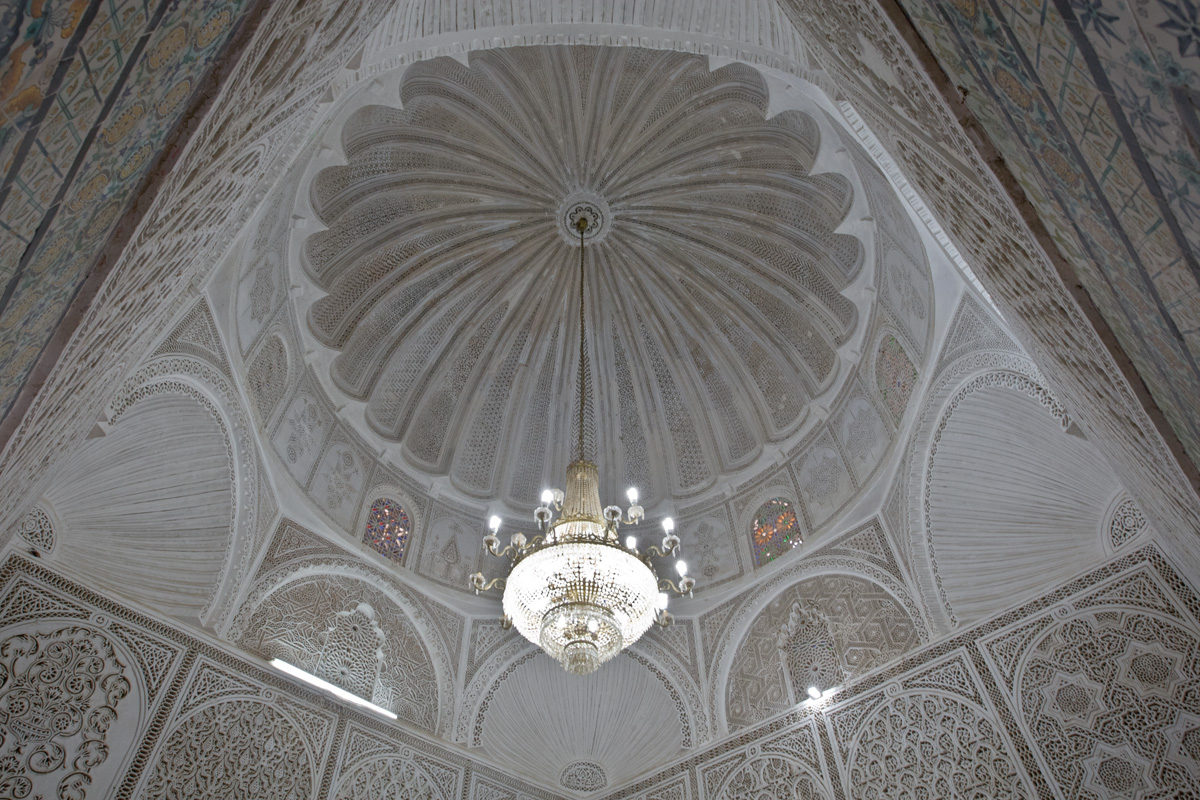
Dome of the chamber between the vestibule and the second courtyard

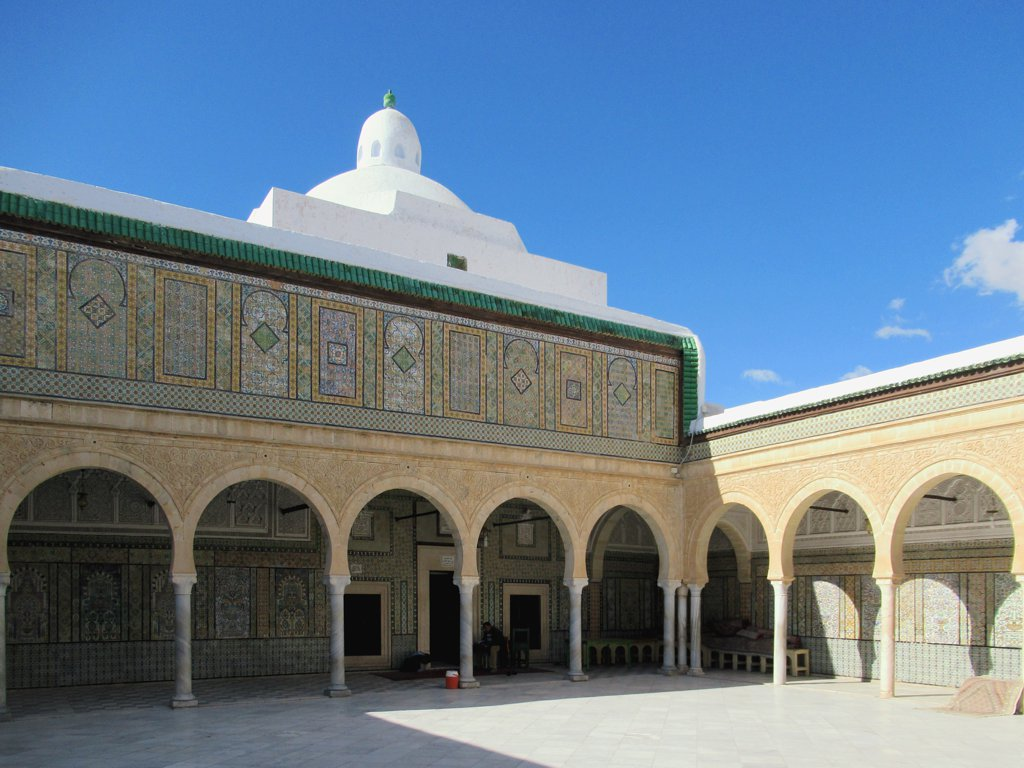
The second courtyard, looking towards the mausoleum chamber's dome

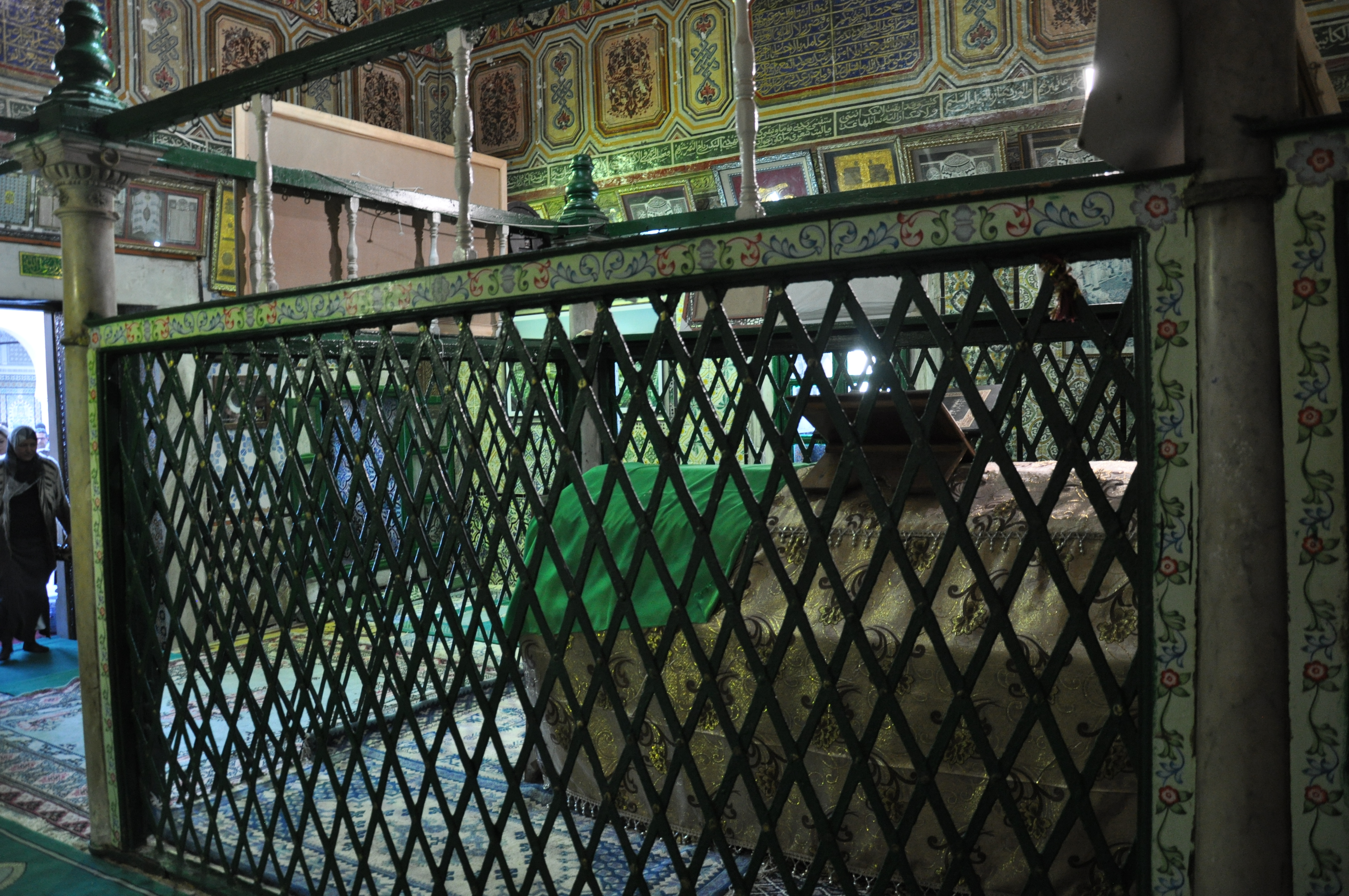
The mausoleum chamber, with the tomb cenotaph behind a fence

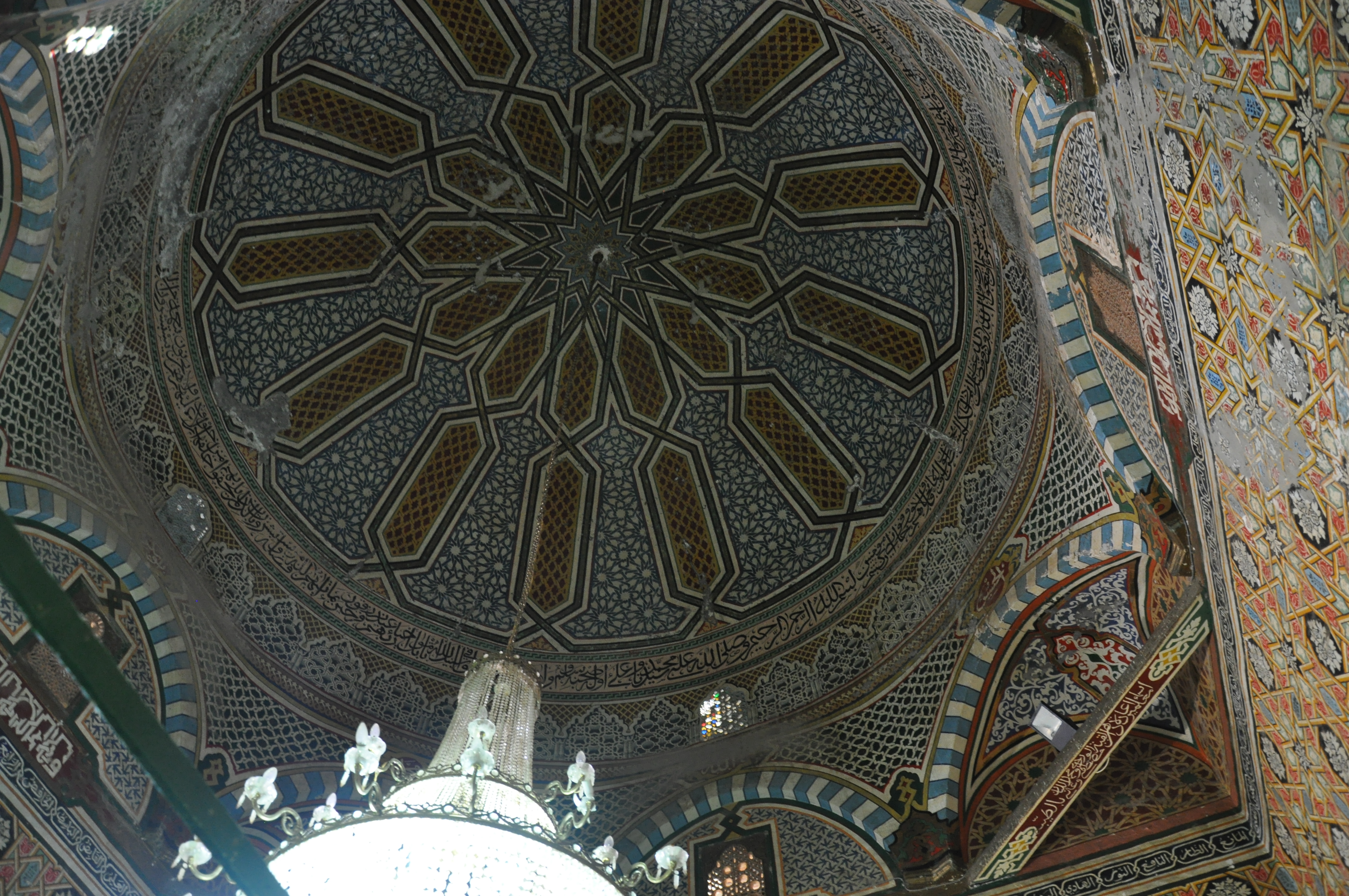
Dome over the mausoleum chamber
