= Zawiya (institution) =

Islamic religious school or monastery

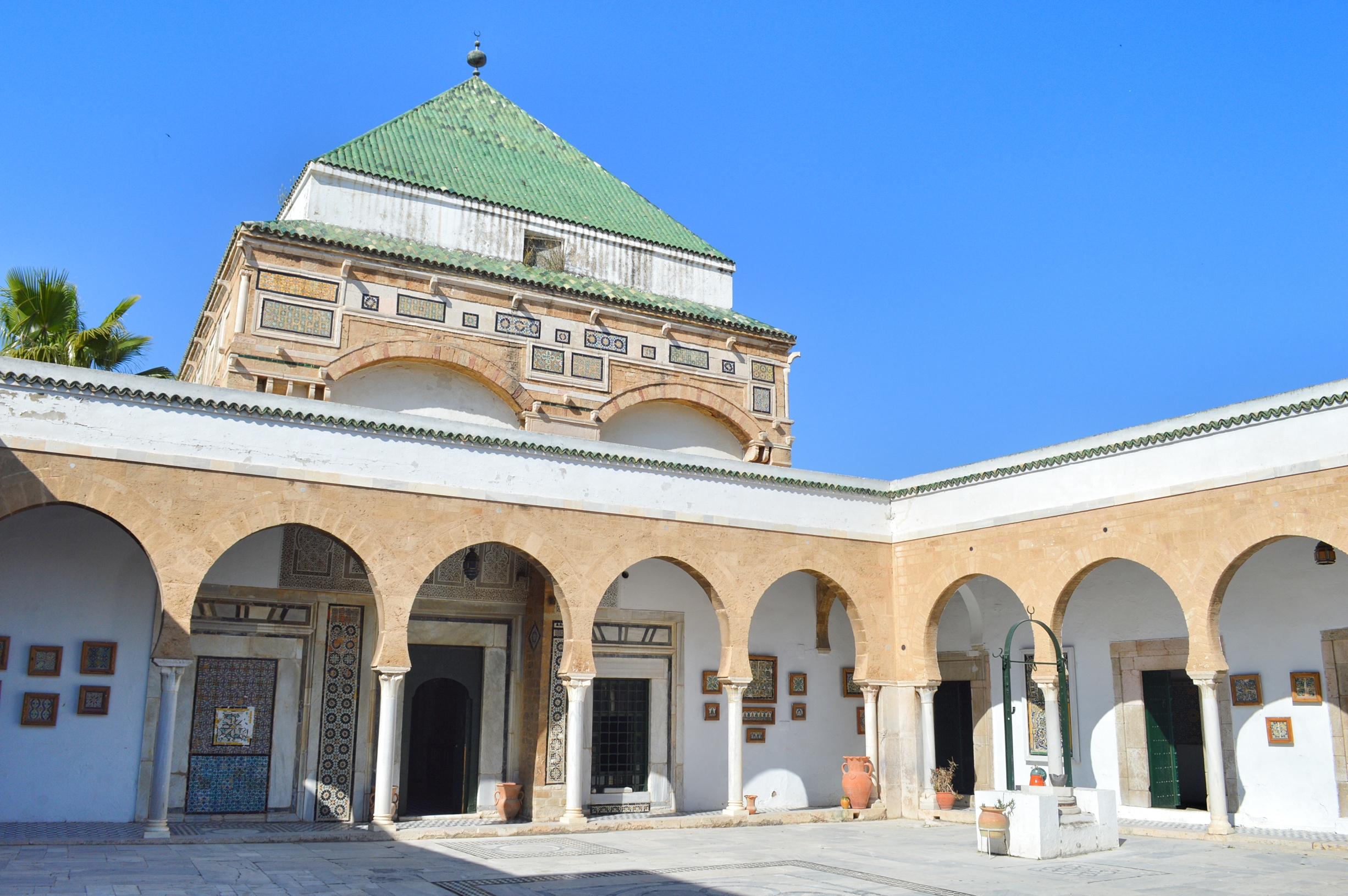
Zawiya of Sidi Qasim al-Jalizi in Tunis: view of the courtyard leading to the mausoleum chamber

A zawiya or zaouia (Note: "Zaouia" is traditionally the French transliteration of Arabic زاوية, while "zawiya" is a more common English transliteration. The spelling "zaouia" is still generally used in some countries, like Morocco.) (Arabic: زاوية, romanized: zāwiyah, lit. 'corner'; Turkish: zaviye; also spelled zawiyah or zawiyya) is a building and institution associated with Sufis in the Islamic world. It can serve a variety of functions such a place of worship, school, monastery and/or mausoleum. In some regions the term is interchangeable with the term khanqah, which serves a similar purpose. In the Maghreb, the term is often used for a place where the founder of a Sufi order or a local saint or holy man (e.g. a wali) lived and was buried. In the Maghreb the word can also be used to refer to the wider tariqa (Sufi order or brotherhood) and its membership.

== Etymology ==
The Arabic term zāwiyah (Arabic: زاوية) translates literally as "corner" or "nook". The term was first applied to the cells of Christian monks, before the meaning was applied to a small mosque or prayer room. In the later medieval period, it came to denote a structure housing a Sufi brotherhood, especially in North Africa. In modern times, the word has still retained the earlier meaning of small prayer room in West Asia and the Muslim countries east of North Africa, where it can be used to contrast small prayer spaces with more important mosques.

== Maghreb ==
=== Religious and social functions ===
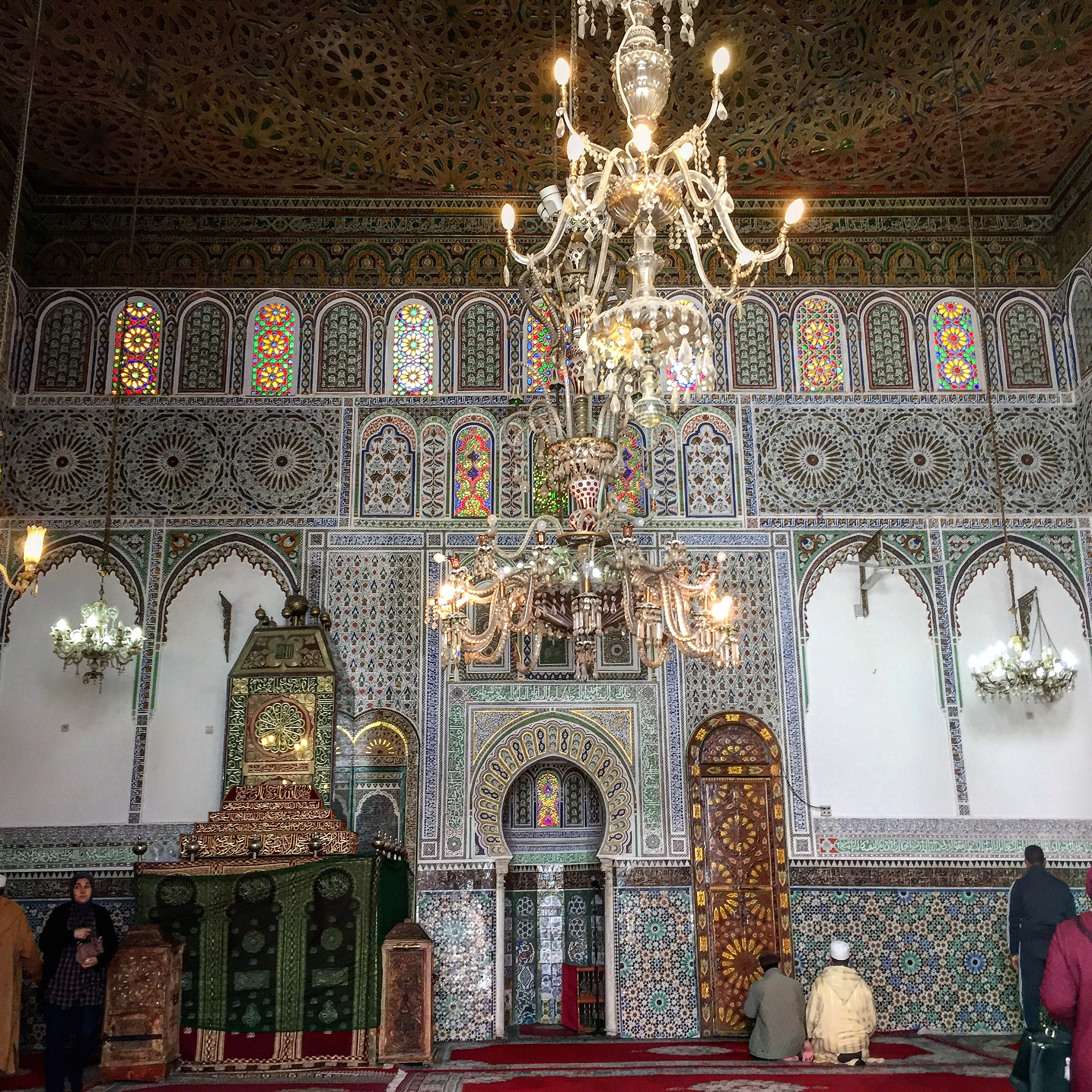
Interior of the mausoleum of the Zawiya of Moulay Idris II in Fez, Morocco

In the Maghreb (Morocco, Algeria, Tunisia and Libya) the zawiya is primarily a place for religious activities and religious instruction. It is typically associated with a particular religious leader (shaykh) or a local Muslim saint (wali), who is housed here along with his family. After his death, the zawiya usually houses his tomb, commonly inside a qubba (chamber covered by a dome or pyramidal cupola), which is sometimes a shrine that serves as the focus of a minor pilgrimage (a ziyarat). Typically, his descendants continue to lead or maintain the zawiya afterwards. Some zawiyas, particularly in urban areas, are simply meeting places for local members of a wider Sufi order or brotherhood (tariqa), where they perform activities such as a haḍra or a dhikr. Some zawiyas, particularly in rural areas, serve as larger complexes which provide accommodation to pilgrims and contain a library, mosque, workshops, and granaries that serve the local community. Such zawiyas also historically mediated disputes between tribes or between local communities and the central government. In some cases zawiyas could provide asylum to individuals and could wield considerable political and commercial influence in the region. They were financed with the help of waqfs (also known as habous), charitable endowments that were inalienable under Islamic law.

In precolonial times, zawiyas were the primary sources for education in the area, and taught basic literacy to a large proportion of children even in quite remote mountainous areas – literacy rates in Algeria at the time of the French conquest in 1830 were higher than those of European France. Their curriculum began with memorization of the Arabic alphabet and the later, shorter suras of the Qur'an; if a student was sufficiently interested or apt, it progressed to law (fiqh), theology, Arabic grammar (usually taught with ibn Adjurrum's famous summary), mathematics (mainly as it pertained to the complex legal system of inheritance distribution), and sometimes astronomy. These are still operational throughout the Maghreb, and continue to be a major educational resource in the Sahel of West Africa, from Mauritania to Nigeria.

=== History ===
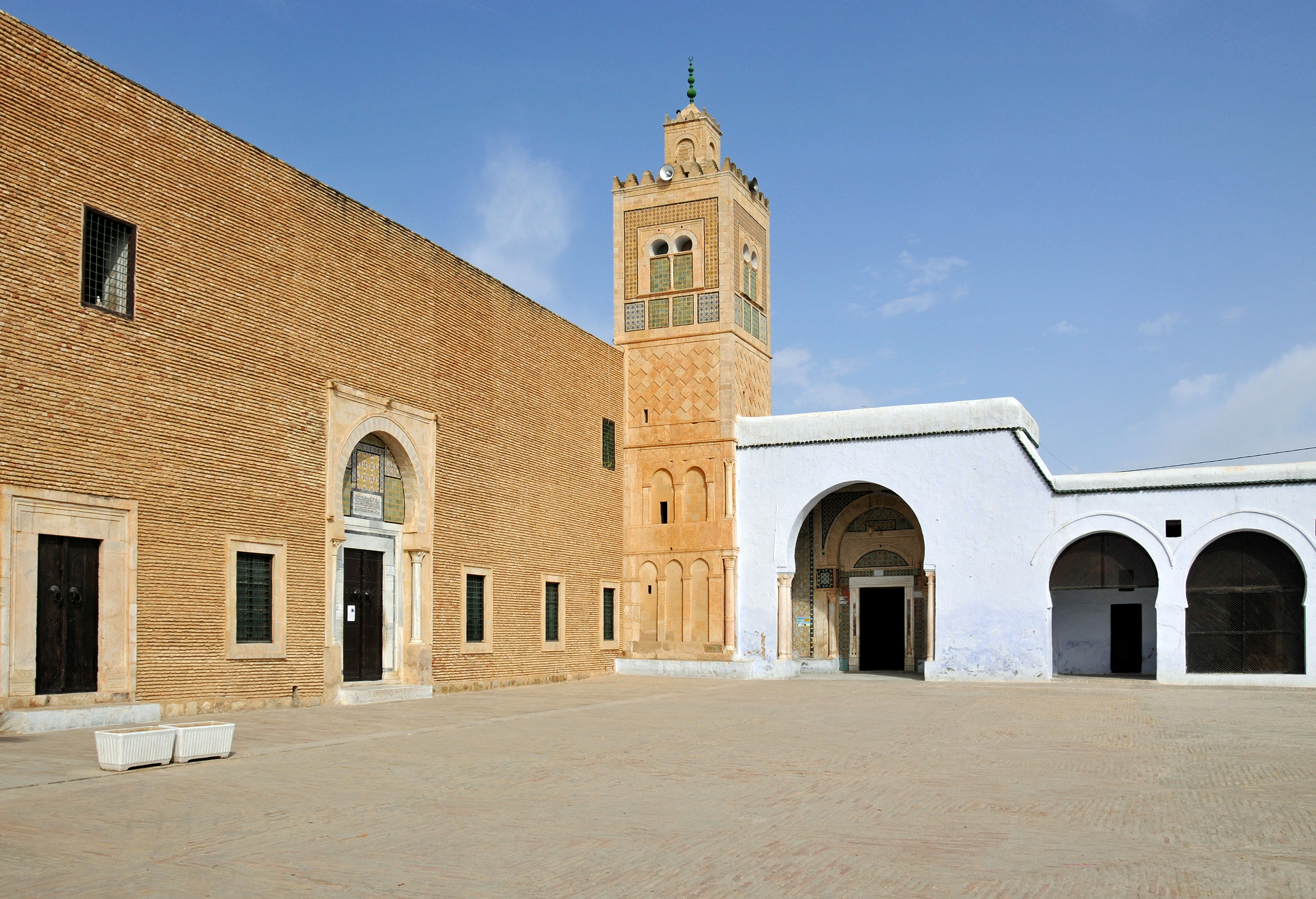
Zawiya of Sidi Sahib in Kairouan (rebuilt in the 17th century)

The zawiya as an institution pre-dates the arrival of formal tariqas in North Africa and traces its origins to the qubba tombs which sometimes acted as shrines and to the early ribats on the frontier of the Islamic world to which holy men sometimes retired with their followers. The first zawiya buildings in Ifriqiya (present-day Tunisia) were built under Hafsid rule in the 14th century. The zawiyas of Kairouan are believed to be the oldest and are centered around the tombs of local saints. These include the Zawiya of Sidi Sahib (or Abu Zama'a al-Balawi), founded in the 14th century (though the current building dates from the 17th century), and the Zawiya of Sidi 'Abid al-Ghariani, which was also established in the 14th century. The first formal zawiyas in Morocco were founded under the Marinid dynasty in the 14th century as well, most notably the zawiya built in Chellah by Abu al-Hasan and the Zawiyat an-Nussak built by his successor Abu Inan in Salé. Both examples, partly ruined today, were similar to madrasas in form and function. In Algeria, another major example is the religious complex of Sidi Abu Madyan (or Sidi Boumediene), also founded by Abu al-Hasan and built around the older tomb of Abu Madyan (d. 1197). In Fez, the tomb of Idris II, a sharif (descendant of Muhammad) and one of the city's founders, was rebuilt in the early 14th and early 15th centuries and maintained by his Idrisid descendants. In Tunis, the Zawiya of Sidi Ben 'Arus and the Zawiya of Sidi Qasim al-Jalizi, two of the most important zawiyas in the city, were both established near the end of the 15th century around the tombs of important saints.

Under the sharifian dynasties of the Saadis and 'Alawis in Morocco, zawiyas became more common, more socially and politically important, and architecturally more elaborate. In Marrakesh, both dynasties built funerary structures and religious complexes around the tombs of what became known as the Seven Saints of the city. The Zawiya of Idris II in Fez was lavishly rebuilt by Moulay Isma'il in the early 18th century, becoming a major landmark and marking the growing importance of shrines related to the tombs of sharifian figures. During periods of weak central rule Sufi orders and zawiyas were able to assert their political power and control large territories. In particular, during the so-called Maraboutic Crisis in the 17th century the Dila Zawiya (or Dala'iyya), a Sufi order among the Berbers of the Middle Atlas, rose to power and controlled most of central Morocco, while another zawiya order based in the town of Iligh ruled the Sous region. The Zawiya al-Nasiriyya in Tamegroute, which still exists today, also ruled as an effectively independent principality to the southeast during this time.

By the 19th century, zawiyas, both as individual institutions and as popular Sufi tariqas, had large and widespread memberships across the population of the Maghreb. The Sanusiyya tariqa, for example, was widespread and influential in Libya and the eastern Sahara regions. In Tunisia, many zawiyas were patronized and supported by the government of the Husaynid beys. A late 19th-century French source estimated that in 1880 there were 355 zawiyas in Algeria with a membership of 167,019 out of a population of slightly less than three million Muslims in the country. In Morocco, an estimated 5-10% of the population in 1939 were members of one zawiya or another. During the colonial occupations of these countries some zawiyas collaborated with the authorities while others resisted. During the late 19th century and early 20th century, colonial governments in North Africa confiscated waqf properties or marginalized the waqf system that funded zawiyas as a way of diminishing their power and influence. Their influence and social importance was also undermined in the 20th century due to the opposition of Salafist and Wahhabist movements.

== Egypt ==
Zawiyas and khanqahs were not established in Egypt until the Ayyubids came to power in the late 12th century. They proliferated during the Mamluk period (1250–1517) and the later Ottoman period of Egypt (after 1517), when Sufi brotherhoods were important religious organizations for much of the population. In Mamluk Egypt a khanqah was a formal institution typically founded by an elite patron (the sultan or an emir) and not necessarily associated with a specific Sufi order. The term zawiya, on the other hand, was for smaller, less formal institutions of popular Sufism that were usually devoted to a specific shaykh and a specific Sufi brotherhood. The only surviving building in Cairo which is explicitly identified as a zawiya by its foundation inscription is the Zawiya of Zayn al-Din Yusuf in the Southern Cemetery, founded in 1297–98 and expanded in the early 14th century.

== Sub-Saharan Africa ==
In sub-Saharan Africa zawiyas proliferated somewhat later than in North Africa, appearing in conjunction with the development of Sufi brotherhoods and networks across the region in the 18th and 19th centuries. Zawiyas that were established in towns and staging posts along Saharan trading routes played a major role in the dissemination of Sufism and in establishing the influence of certain tariqas. Among the tariqas of major importance in West Africa were the Qadiriyya, a wide-ranging order originally begun by Abdul Qadir Gilani (d. 1166), and the Tijaniyya, whose founder Ahmad al-Tijani (d. 1815) is buried in his zawiya in Fez. Another example, the Muridiyya, was of major importance in the history of Senegal.

== Outside Africa ==
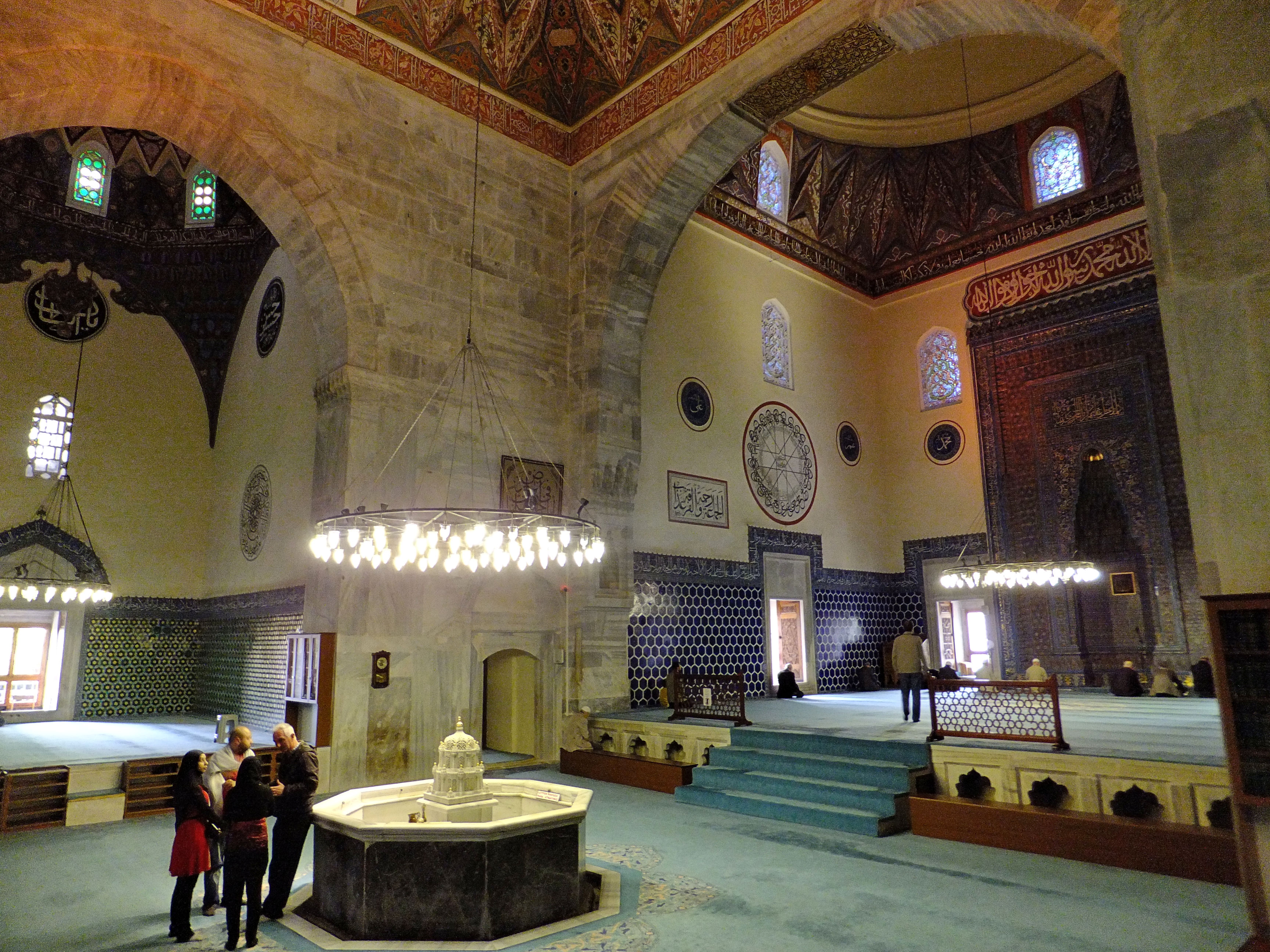
Interior of the Green Mosque, an early 15th-century Ottoman zaviye in Bursa

In the rest of the Islamic world, similar Sufi institutions usually went by other names such as a khanqah, takya (or takiyya in Arabic, tekke in Turkish), or dargah (shrine), though these terms sometimes had more specific meanings. In the early Ottoman Empire, the cognate term zaviye usually designated a multi-purpose religious complex that catered to Sufis and served as a place of worship. Many important early Ottoman mosques such as the Green Mosque in Bursa, built in the early 15th century, are examples of this type.

== See also ==
- Zawiyas in Algeria
- Surau
- List of historical tekkes, zaviyes, and dergahs in Istanbul
