= Architecture of Tunisia =

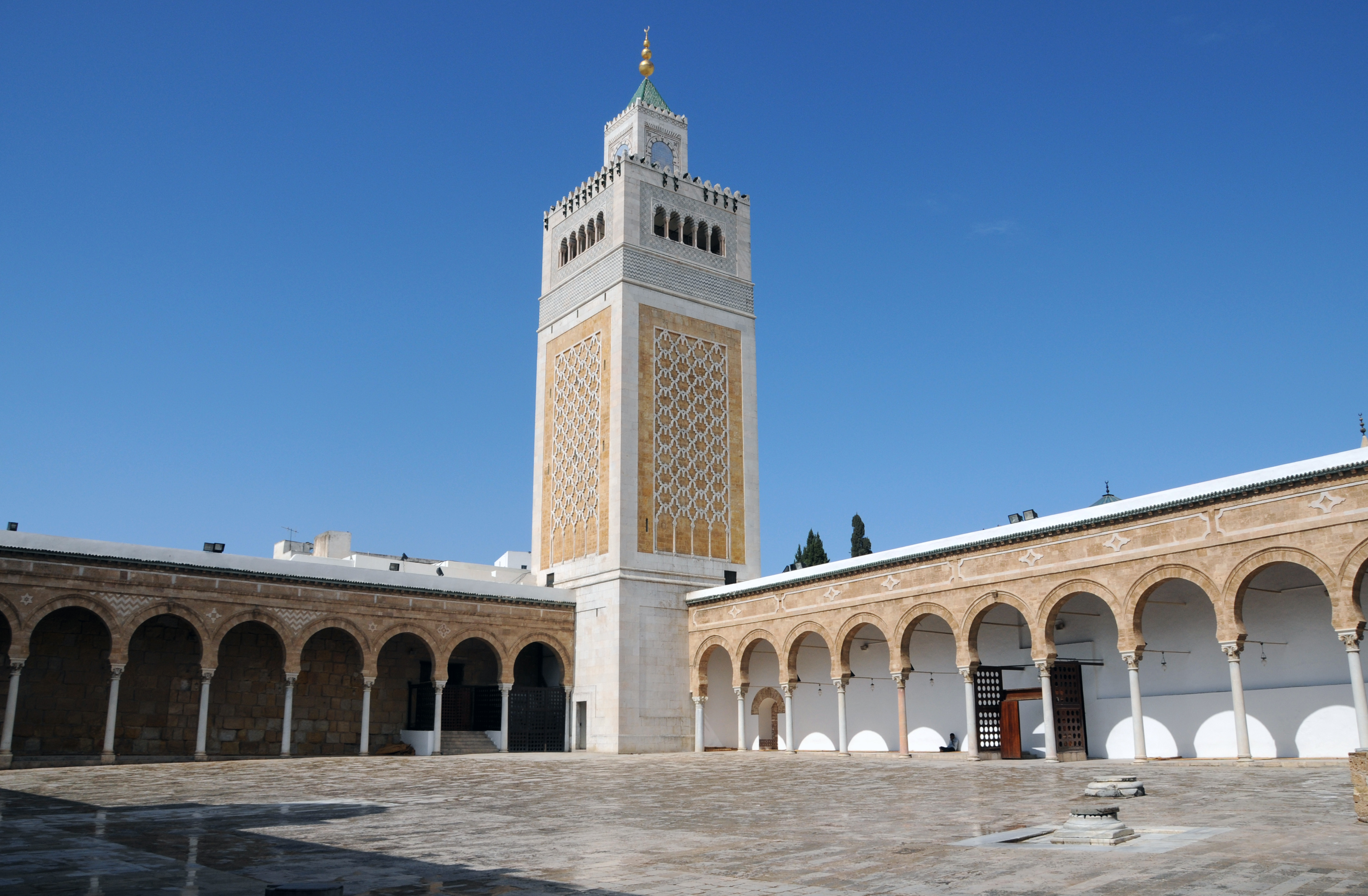
The Great Mosque of al-Zaytuna in Tunis

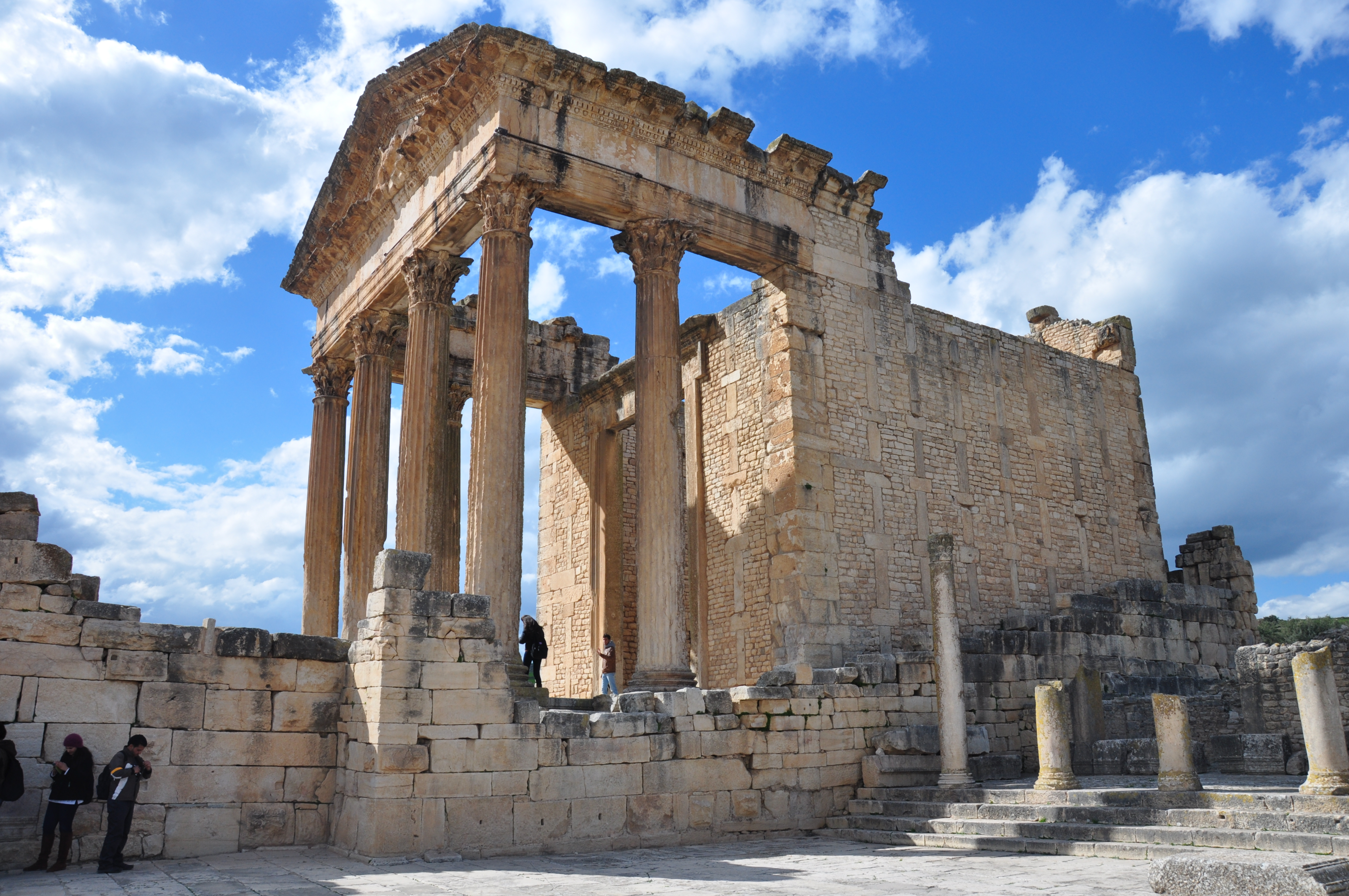
Capitoline temple at the Roman site of Dougga

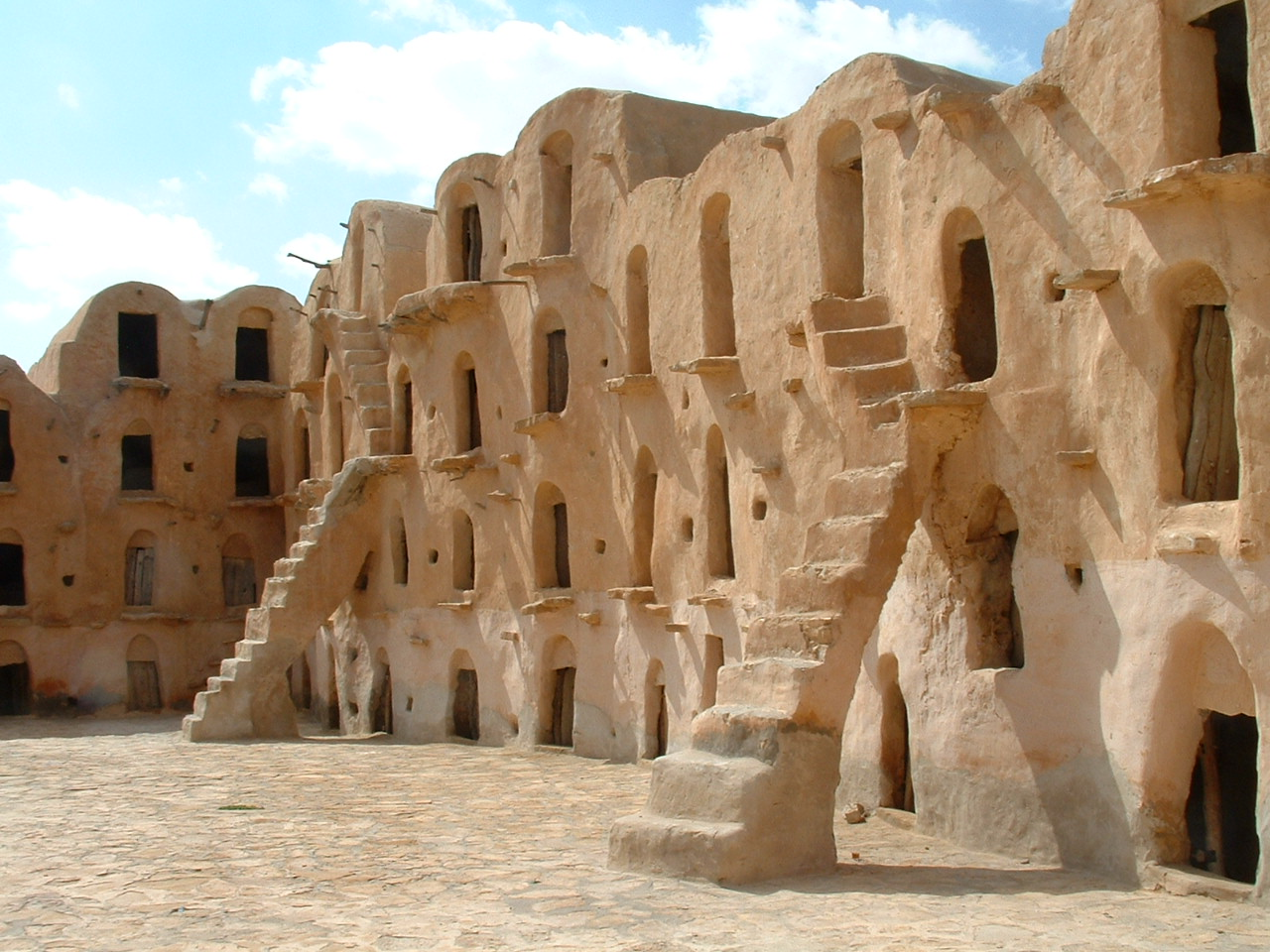
Ksar Ouled Soltane, an example of a multi-level ghorfa (fortified granary) in southern Tunisia

The architecture of Tunisia began with the ancient civilizations such as the Carthaginians, Numidians, and Romans. After the 7th century, Islamic architecture developed in the region under a succession of dynasties and empires. In the late 19th century French colonial rule introduced European architecture, and modern architecture became common in the second half of the 20th century. The southern regions of the country are also home to diverse examples of local vernacular architecture used by the Berber (Amazigh) population.

== Antiquity ==
=== Punic Carthage ===
Large regions of North Africa, particularly near the coasts, came under the control of Carthage, a Phoenician civilization, at the height of its power in the third century BC. The remains of Carthage are found near Tunis today and contain the remains of multiple periods ranging from the Punic period to the later Arab occupation. Vestiges of the Punic period include the "Punic Ports" (the city's ancient harbors) and a sanctuary and necropolis dedicated to Baal Hammon, known today as the Sanctuary of Tophet.

=== Numidia ===
The kingdom of Numidia was contemporary with the Carthaginian civilization and the Roman Republic. Among other things, the Numidians have left thousands of pre-Christian tombs. The oldest of these is Medracen in present-day Algeria, believed to date from the time of Masinissa (202–148 BC), which consists of a tumulus structure in ashlar masonry. Elsewhere, a number of "tower tombs" from the Numidian period can also be found in sites from Algeria to Libya. Despite their wide geographic range, they often share a similar style: a three-story structure topped by a convex pyramid. They may have initially been inspired by Greek monuments but they constitute an original type of structure associated with Numidian culture. An important example in present-day Tunisia is the Libyco-Punic Mausoleum at the site of Dougga.

=== Roman and Byzantine period ===
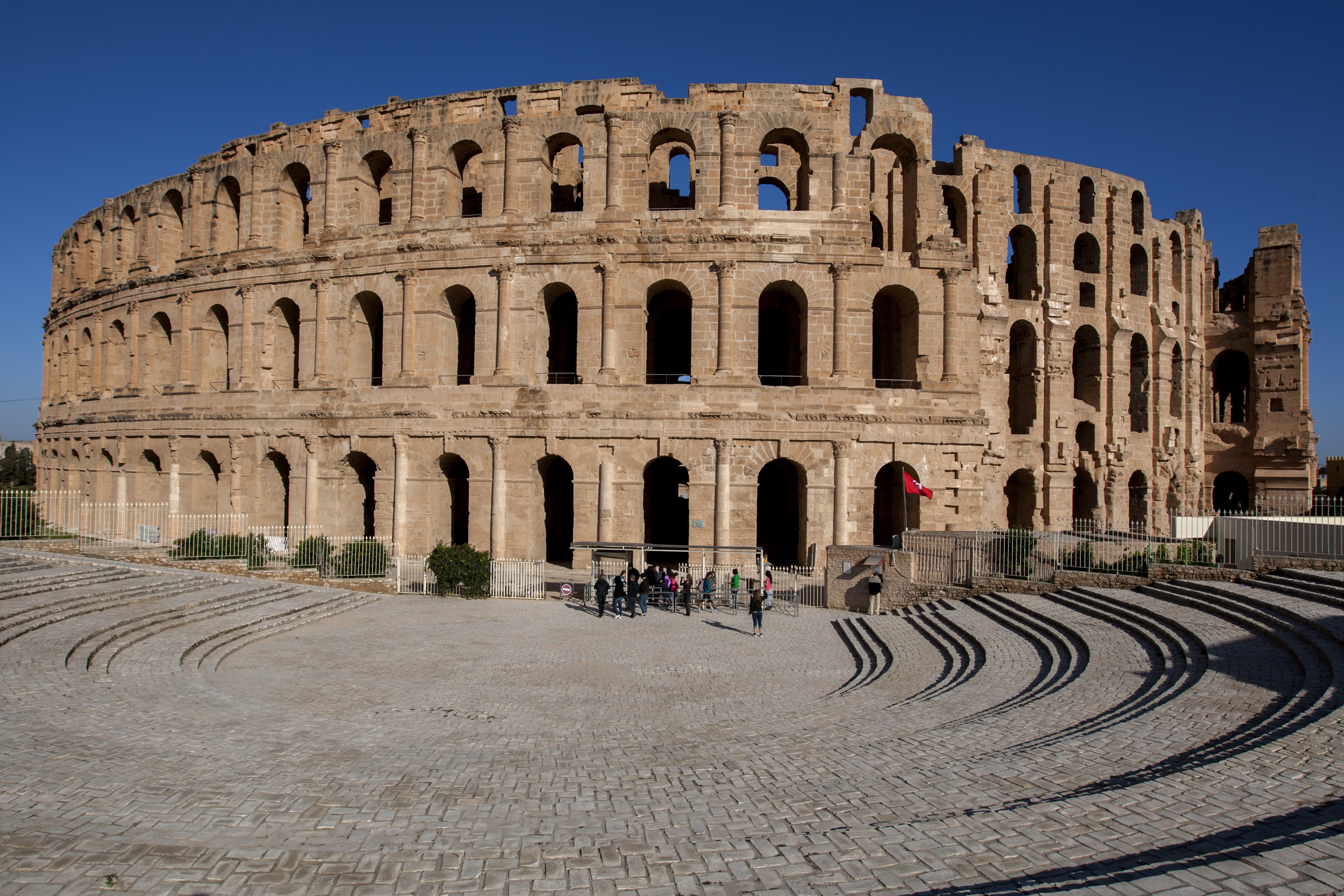
Amphitheatre of El Jem (3rd century)

After defeating Carthage, Rome progressively took over the entire coast of North Africa from Egypt to the Atlantic coast of modern-day Morocco. Most of present-day Tunisia was occupied by the Roman province known as Africa. Significant remains of Roman architecture can be found in Tunisia today, including Roman Carthage, the amphitheater of El Jem, the site of Dougga (Thugga), the temples of Sbeitla (Sufetula), and others. After the fall of the Western Roman Empire, the Eastern Roman or Byzantine Empire continued to rule parts of the region up until the 7th century.

== Early Islamic period ==
In the 7th century the region of North Africa became steadily integrated into the emerging Muslim world during the Early Arab-Muslim Conquests. The territory of Ifriqiya (roughly present-day Tunisia), and its newly founded capital city of Kairouan (also transliterated as "Qayrawan") became an early center of Islamic culture for the region. The Great Mosque of Kairouan was founded here by Uqba ibn Nafi in 670, though it was rebuilt under the Aghlabids. Islamic architecture continued to develop in the region afterwards.

=== Aghlabids ===
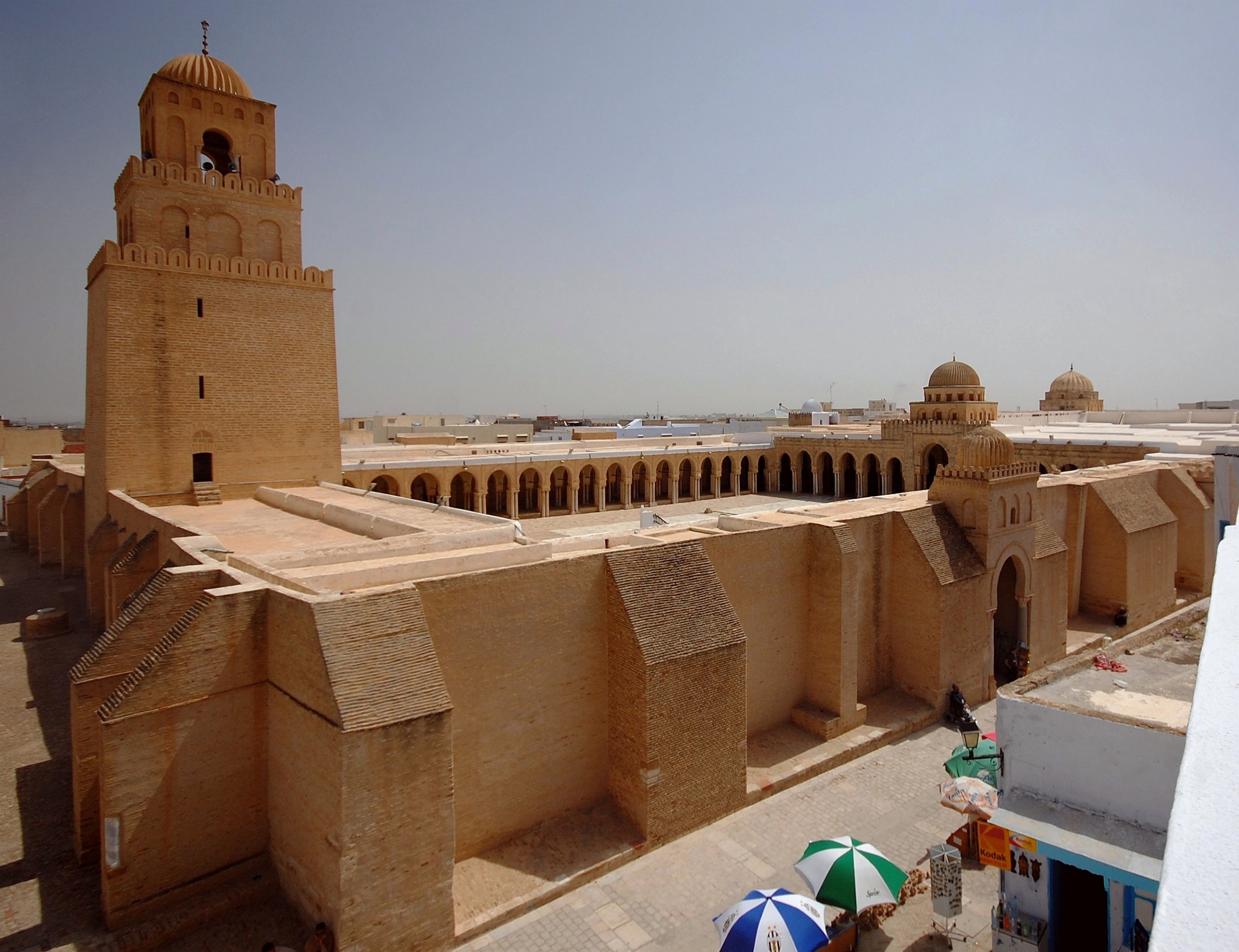
View of the Great Mosque of Kairouan in Tunisia, originally founded by Uqba ibn Nafi in 640 but rebuilt by the Aghlabids in the 9th century

In the 9th century the province of Ifriqiya, while still nominally under the control of the Abbasid Caliphs in Baghdad, was de facto ruled by the Aghlabid dynasty. The Aghlabids were major builders and erected many of Tunisia's oldest Islamic-era monuments, including military structures like the Ribat of Sousse and the Ribat of Monastir, religious buildings like the Great Mosque of Sousse and the Great Mosque of Sfax, and practical infrastructure works like the Aghlabid Reservoirs of Kairouan. The al-Zaytuna Mosque in Tunis, which was founded earlier around 698, owes its overall current form to the Aghlabid emir Abu Ibrahim Ahmad (r. 856–863). Much of Aghlabid architecture, even their mosques, had a heavy and almost fortress-like appearance, but they nonetheless left an influential artistic legacy. For example, the Mosque of Ibn Khayrun (also known as the "Mosque of the Three Doors") possesses what is considered by some to be the oldest decorated external façade in Islamic architecture, featuring carved Kufic inscriptions and vegetal motifs.

One of the most important Aghlabid monuments is the Great Mosque of Kairouan, which was completely rebuilt by the emir Abu Muhammad Ziyadat Allah (r. 817–838) in 836, although various additions and repairs were effected later which complicate the chronology of its construction. The mosque features an enormous rectangular courtyard, a large hypostyle prayer hall, and a thick three-story minaret (tower from which the call to prayer was issued). The mihrab (niche symbolizing the direction of prayer) of the prayer hall is among the oldest examples of its kind, richly decorated with marble panels carved in high-relief vegetal motifs and with ceramic tiles with overglaze and luster. Next to the mihrab is the oldest surviving minbar (pulpit) in the world, made of richly carved teakwood panels. Both the carved panels of the minbar and the ceramic tiles of the mihrab are believed to be imports from Abbasid Iraq. An elegant dome in front of the mihrab with an elaborately decorated drum is one of architectural highlights of this period.

=== Fatimids ===
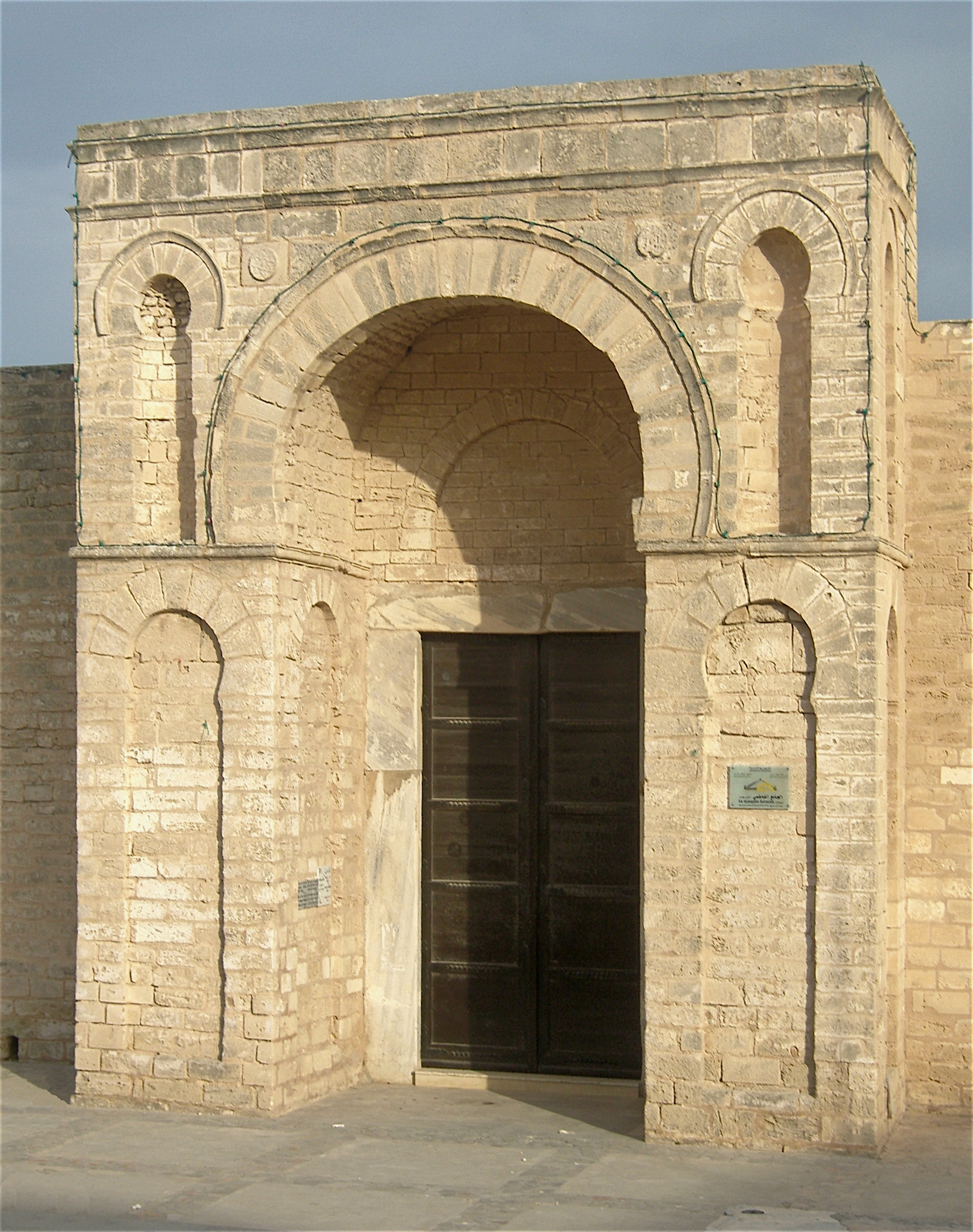
The original entrance portal of the Fatimid Great Mosque of Mahdia (10th century)

In Ifriqiya, the Fatimids also built extensively, most notably with the creation of a new fortified capital on the coast, Mahdia. Construction began in 916 and the new city was officially inaugurated on February 20, 921, although some construction continued. In addition to its heavy fortified walls, the city included the Fatimid palaces, an artificial harbor, and the Great Mosque of Mahdia. Much of this has not survived to the present day. Fragments of mosaic pavements from the palaces have been discovered from modern excavations. The mosque is one of the most well-preserved Fatimid monuments in the Maghreb, although it too has been extensively damaged over time and was in large part reconstructed by archeologists in the 1960s. It consists of a hypostyle prayer hall with a roughly square courtyard. The mosque's original main entrance, a monumental portal projecting from the wall, was relatively unusual at the time and may have been inspired by ancient Roman triumphal arches. Another unusual feature was the absence of a minaret, which may have reflected an early Fatimid rejection of such structures as unnecessary innovations.

== Islamic Berber dynasties ==
=== Zirids ===
After the Fatimids moved their base of power to Cairo, Egypt, in the 10th century, new Berber dynasties such as the Zirids ruled nominally on their behalf. As independent rulers, however, the Zirids of Ifriqiya built relatively few grand structures. They reportedly built a new palace at al-Mansuriyya, a former Fatimid capital near Kairouan, but it has not been found by modern archeologists. In Kairouan itself the Great Mosque was restored by Al-Mu'izz ibn Badis. The wooden maqsura within the mosque today is believed to date from this time. It is the oldest maqsura in the Islamic world to be preserved in situ and was commissioned by al-Mu῾izz ibn Badis in the first half of the 11th century (though later restored). It is notable for its woodwork, which includes an elaborately carved Kufic inscription dedicated to al-Mu'izz. The Qubbat al-Bahw, an elegant dome at the entrance of the prayer hall of the al-Zaytuna Mosque in Tunis, dates from 991 and can be attributed to Al-Mansur ibn Buluggin.

=== Hafsids (and Almohads) ===
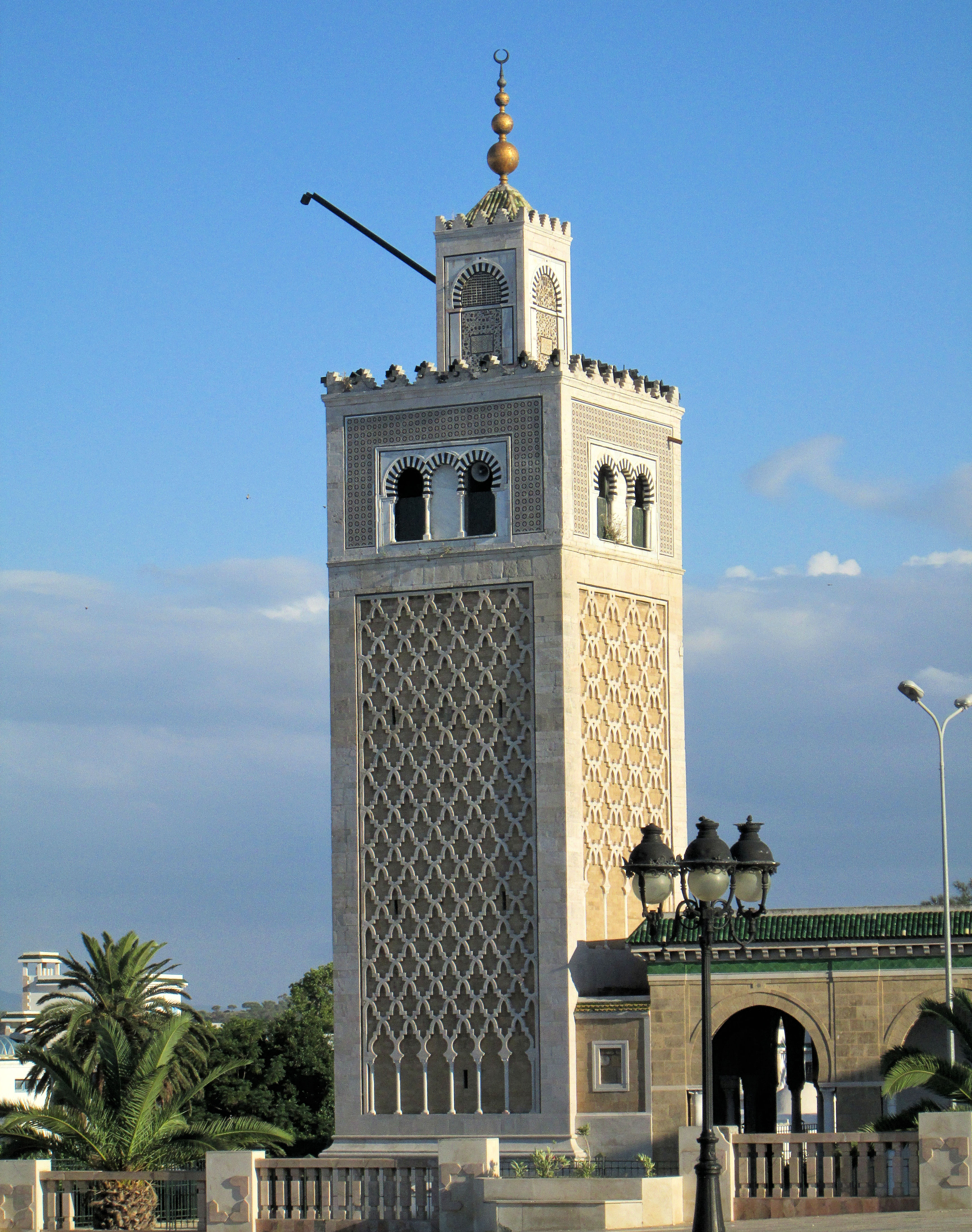
The minaret of the Kasbah Mosque of Tunis, built at the beginning of the Hafsid period in the early 1230s

The patronage of the Almohads – as well as of the Almoravids who preceded them in the western Maghreb – is considered one of the most formative stages of "Moorish" (western Islamic) architecture, establishing many of the forms and motifs that defined architectural styles in the region during the subsequent centuries. Ifriqiya was far from the main Almohad capital at Marrakesh (present-day Morocco) and the Almohads themselves did not leave significant monuments here. However, they made Tunis the regional capital of their territories in Ifriqiya and established the city's kasbah (citadel) as their center of government.

The Hafsids, a branch of the Almohad ruling class, declared their independence from the Almohads in 1229 and developed their own state which came to control much of Ifriqiya and some of the surrounding region. They were also significant builders, particularly under the reigns of successful leaders like Abu Zakariya (ruled 1229–1249) and Abu Faris (ruled 1394–1434), though not many of their monuments have survived intact to the present-day. While Kairouan remained an important religious center, Tunis was the capital and progressively replaced it as the main city of the region and the main center of architectural patronage. Unlike the architecture further west, Hafsid architecture was built primarily in stone (rather than brick or mudbrick) and appears to have featured much less decoration. In reviewing the history of architecture in the region, scholar Jonathan Bloom remarks that Hafsid architecture seems to have "largely charted a course independent of the developments elsewhere in the Maghrib [North Africa]".

The Kasbah Mosque of Tunis was one of the first works of this period, built by Abu Zakariya (the first independent Hafsid ruler) at the beginning of his reign. Its floor plan had noticeable differences from previous Almohad-period mosques but the minaret, completed in 1233, bears very strong resemblance the minaret of the earlier Almohad Kasbah Mosque in Marrakesh. This Hafsid minaret influenced the design of later Tunisian minarets. Other foundations from the Hafsid period in Tunis include the Haliq Mosque (13th century) and the al-Hawa Mosque (1375), and the Bab al-Aqwas Mosque (15th century). The Hafsids also made significant renovations to the much older Great Mosque of Kairouan – renovating its ceiling, reinforcing its walls, and building or rebuilding two of its entrance gates in 1293 – as well as to the al-Zaytuna Mosque in Tunis. The Bardo Palace (today a national museum) was also begun by the Hafsids in the 15th century, and is mentioned in historical records for the first time during the reign of Abu Faris.

The Hafsids also introduced the first madrasas to the region, beginning with the Madrasa al-Shamma῾iyya built in Tunis in 1238 (or in 1249 according to some sources). This was followed by many others (almost all of them in Tunis) such as the Madrasa al-Hawa founded in the 1250s, the Madrasa al-Ma'ridiya (1282), and the Madrasa al-Unqiya (1341). Many of these early madrasas, however, have been poorly preserved or have been considerably modified in the centuries since their foundation. The Madrasa al-Muntasiriya, completed in 1437, is among the best preserved madrasas of the Hafsid period.

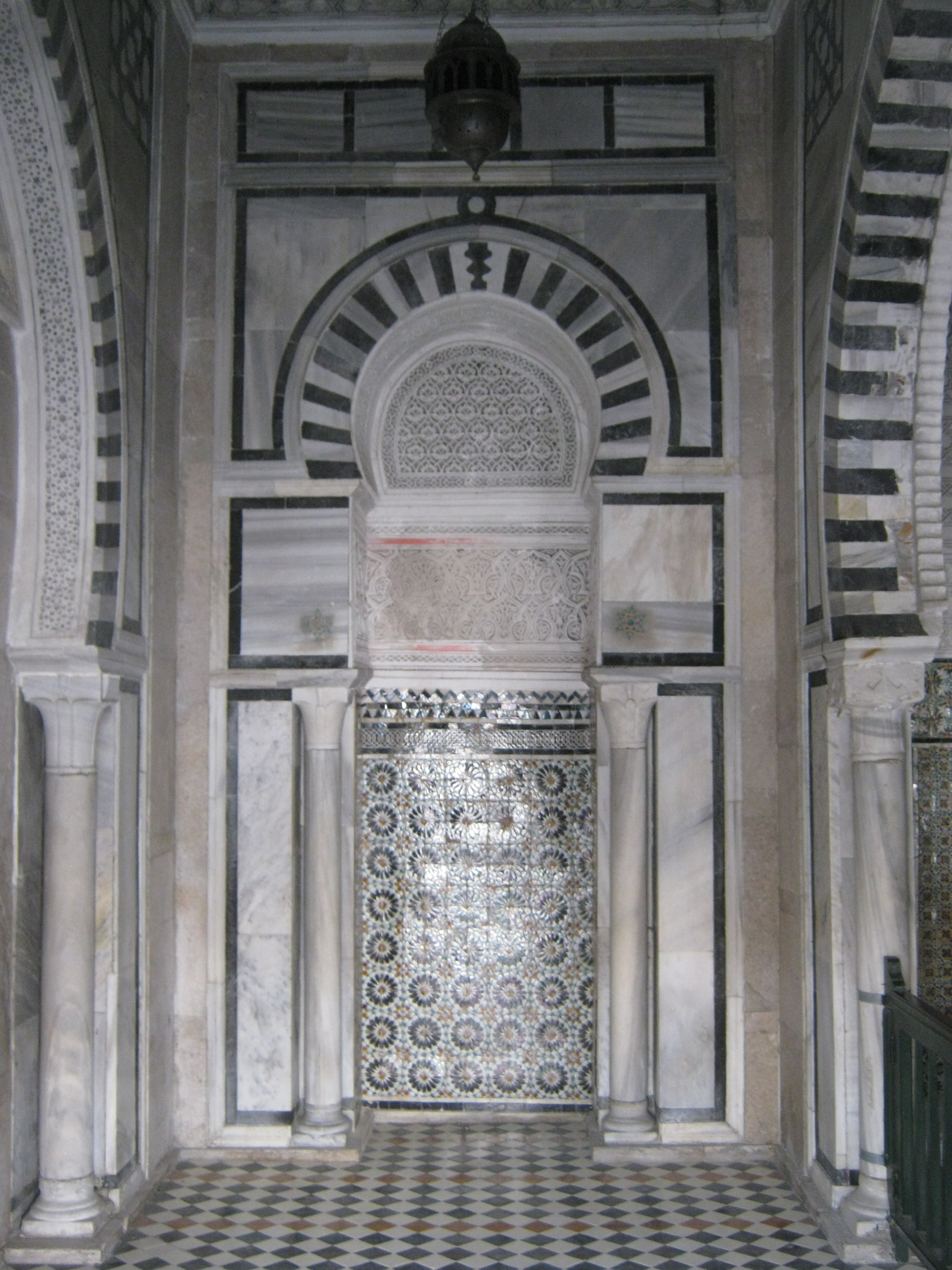
Interior of the Mausoleum chamber of Sidi Qasim al-Jalizi (c. 1496), with a mix of stucco, tile, and marble decoration with different influences

The Mausoleum of Sidi Qasim al-Jalizi, in the suburbs west of Tunis, was built towards the end of the 15th century (c. 1496), founded by Sidi Qasim al-Jalizi (d. 1496), a zellij craftsman of Andalusi origin who was buried here at his death. While expanded in later centuries, the main mausoleum chamber still dates to the Hafsid period and displays a fusion of styles that is characteristic of the period. Rather than covered by a traditional vault or spherical dome, the chamber is covered by a pyramidal wooden roof with green tiles on the outside, typical of contemporary buildings further west in Morocco and al-Andalus. The hall's interior is decorated with several elements also characteristic of architecture further west, including carved stucco on the upper walls, flowery capitals, and cuerda seca tiles on the mihrab niche and lower walls that appear to be a local interpretation of the Hispano-Moresque style. On the other hand, the hall also features marble decoration on walls, columns, and around the framing of arches, which appear to be influenced by Ayyubid and Mamluk architecture further east.

== Ottoman period ==
Over the course of the 16th century the central and eastern Maghreb – Algeria, Tunisia, and Libya – came under Ottoman control. Major port cities such as Algiers, Tunis, and Tripoli also became centers of pirate activity, which brought in wealth to local elites but also attracted intrusions by European powers, who occupied and fortified some coastal positions. After 1591, local power in Tunisia was effectively seized by the Janissaries, who appointed a Dey to lead them. In In the late 17th century and early 18th century, Ottoman control became largely nominal and Tunisia was ruled in practice by the Beys, who were drawn from the Muradid dynasty until 1702 and from the Husaynid dynasty after 1705. Architecture in Tunisia came under the influence of Ottoman architecture, especially in the coastal cities where Ottoman influence was strongest. Some European influences were also introduced, particularly through the importation of materials from Italy such as marble.

=== Religious and funerary architecture ===
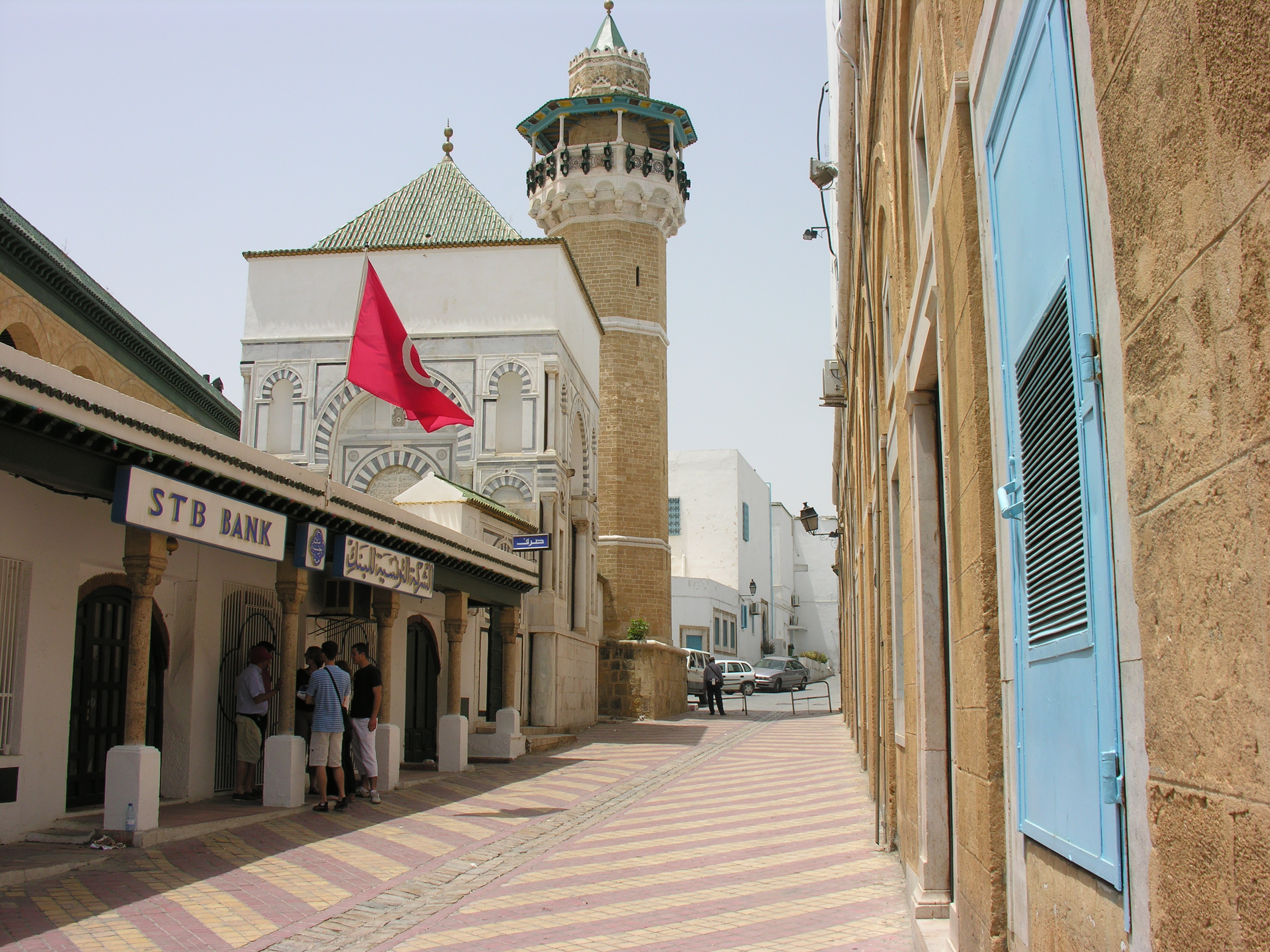
Exterior of the Youssef Dey Mosque complex in Tunis (c. 1614–1639), with mausoleum and minaret visible

In Tunis, the Mosque complex of Yusuf Dey, built or begun around 1614–15 by Yusuf Dey (r. 1610–1637), is one of the earliest and most important examples that imported Ottoman elements into local architecture. Its congregational mosque is accompanied by a madrasa, a primary school, fountains, latrines, and even a café (still functioning today), many of which provided revenues for the upkeep of the complex. This arrangement is similar to Ottoman külliye complexes. It was also the first example of a "funerary mosque" in Tunis, as the complex includes the founder's mausoleum, dated to 1639. While the hypostyle form of the mosque and the pyramidal roof of the mausoleum reflect traditional architecture in the region, the minaret's octagonal shaft reflects the influence of the "pencil"-shaped Ottoman minarets. Instead of the traditional square courtyard, a roughly U-shaped open space wraps around the mosque and a columned portico precedes its entrance. In this period, octagonal minarets often distinguished mosques following the Hanafi maddhab (which was associated with the Ottomans), while mosques which continued to follow the Maliki maddhab (predominant in the Maghreb) continued to employ traditional square-shaft minarets.

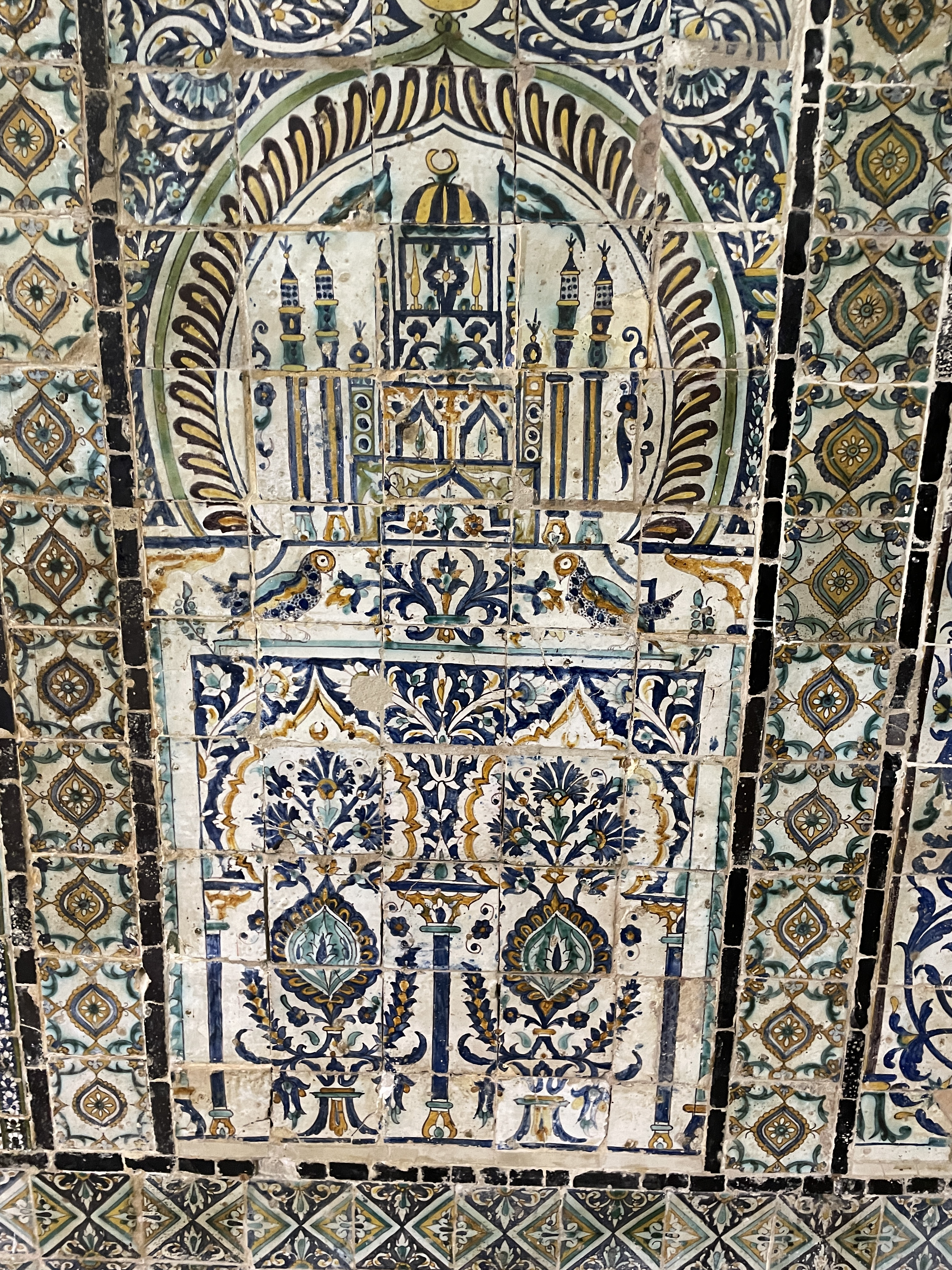
Panel of Qallalin tiles in the Bardo Museum (18th century)

The Muradids built and restored many monuments and structures throughout the country during the 17th century, aided by a flourishing economy. The Mosque of Hammuda Pasha, built by Hammuda Pasha (r. 1631–1664) between 1631 and 1654, reprises many of these same elements as the Yusuf Dey Mosque. Both the Hammuda Pasha Mosque and, to a lesser extent, the Yusuf Dey Mosque make use of marble columns and capitals that were imported from Italy and possibly even carved by Italian craftsmen in Tunis. Hammuda Pasha was also responsible for starting in 1629 a major restoration and expansion of the Zawiya of Abu al-Balawi or "Mosque of the Barber" in Kairouan. While the Zawiya has been further modified since, one of its characteristic 17th-century features is the decoration of underglaze-painted Qallalin tiles on many of its walls. These tiles, generally produced in the Qallalin district of Tunis, are painted with motifs of vases, plants, and arches and use predominant blue, green, and ochre-like yellow colours which distinguish them from contemporary Ottoman tiles. The artistic height of these tiles was in the 17th and 18th centuries.

In Testour, the Great Mosque there was begun in 1615 and constitutes one of the most important examples of mosque architecture influenced by Andalusian morisco immigrants who fled Spain in this period. Its three-tiered minaret has a lower square shaft while its two upper tiers have octagonal shafts decorated with marble paneling, tiles, and – unusually – a 24-hour clock. Elements of the minaret and the mosque appear to be inspired by the architectural styles and construction methods of Aragon and Castile, where the moriscos originated. The minaret of the al-Qsar Mosque in Tunis, added in 1647 by Muhammad Laz Dey (r. 1647–1653) to the much older mosque, also combines a diversity of styles.

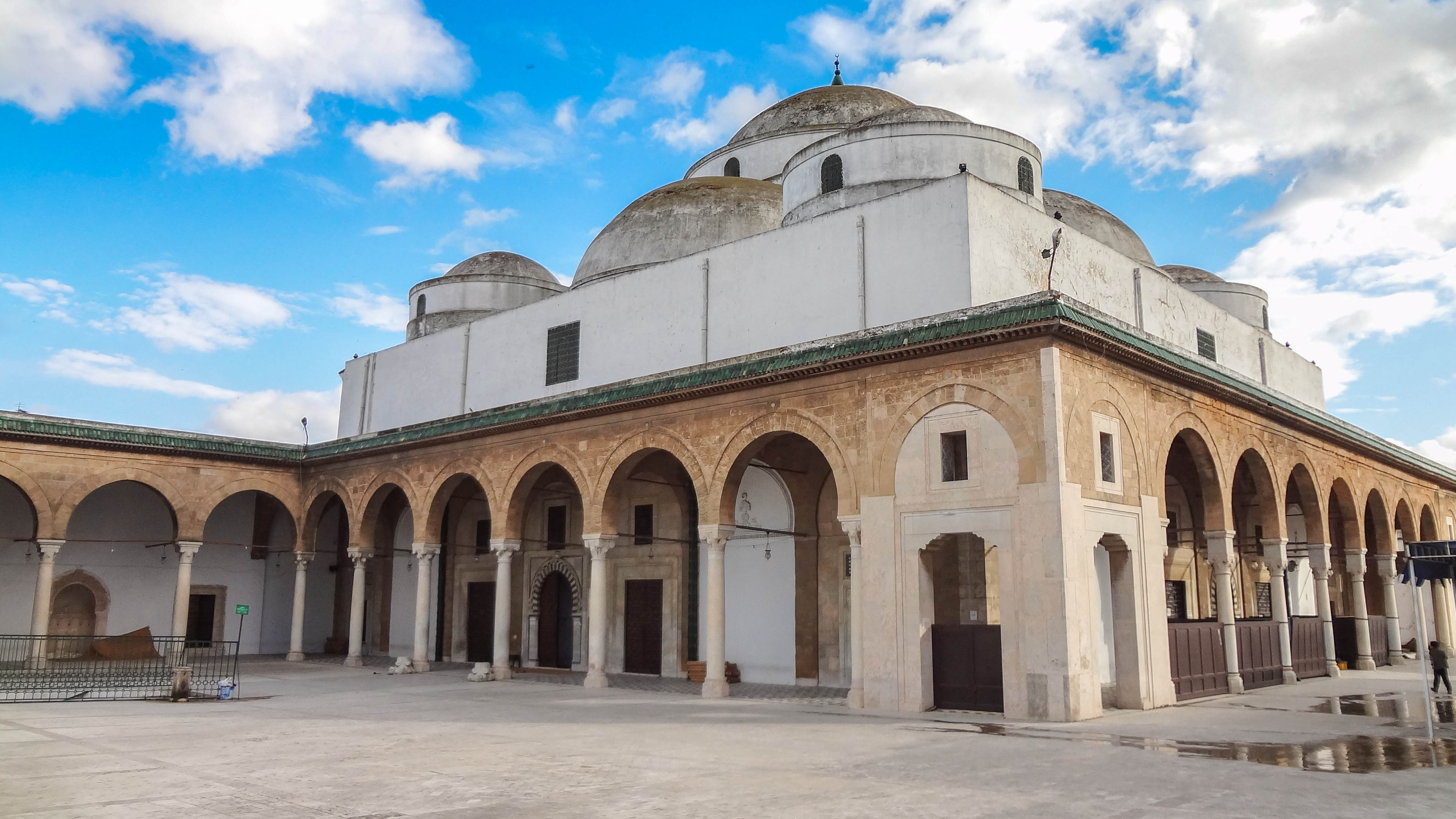
Sidi Mahrez Mosque in Tunis (1696–1699), imitating the form of Ottoman domed mosques

It wasn't until the end of the 17th century that the first Ottoman-style domed mosque was built. Muhammad Bey constructed the Sidi Mahrez Mosque – dedicated to Abu Muhammad Mahraz, d. 1022, who was buried here – which was completed by his successor, Ramadan ibn Murad, between 1696 and 1699. The mosque's prayer hall is covered by a dome system typical of Classical Ottoman architecture and first employed by Sinan for the Şehzade Mosque (c. 1548) in Istanbul: a large central dome flanked by four semi-domes, with four smaller domes at the corners and pendentives in the transitional zones between the semi-domes. The interior is decorated with marble paneling and Ottoman Iznik tiles. This was the only mosque in Tunisia designed in such a strongly Ottoman style and the last major foundation built under the Muradids.

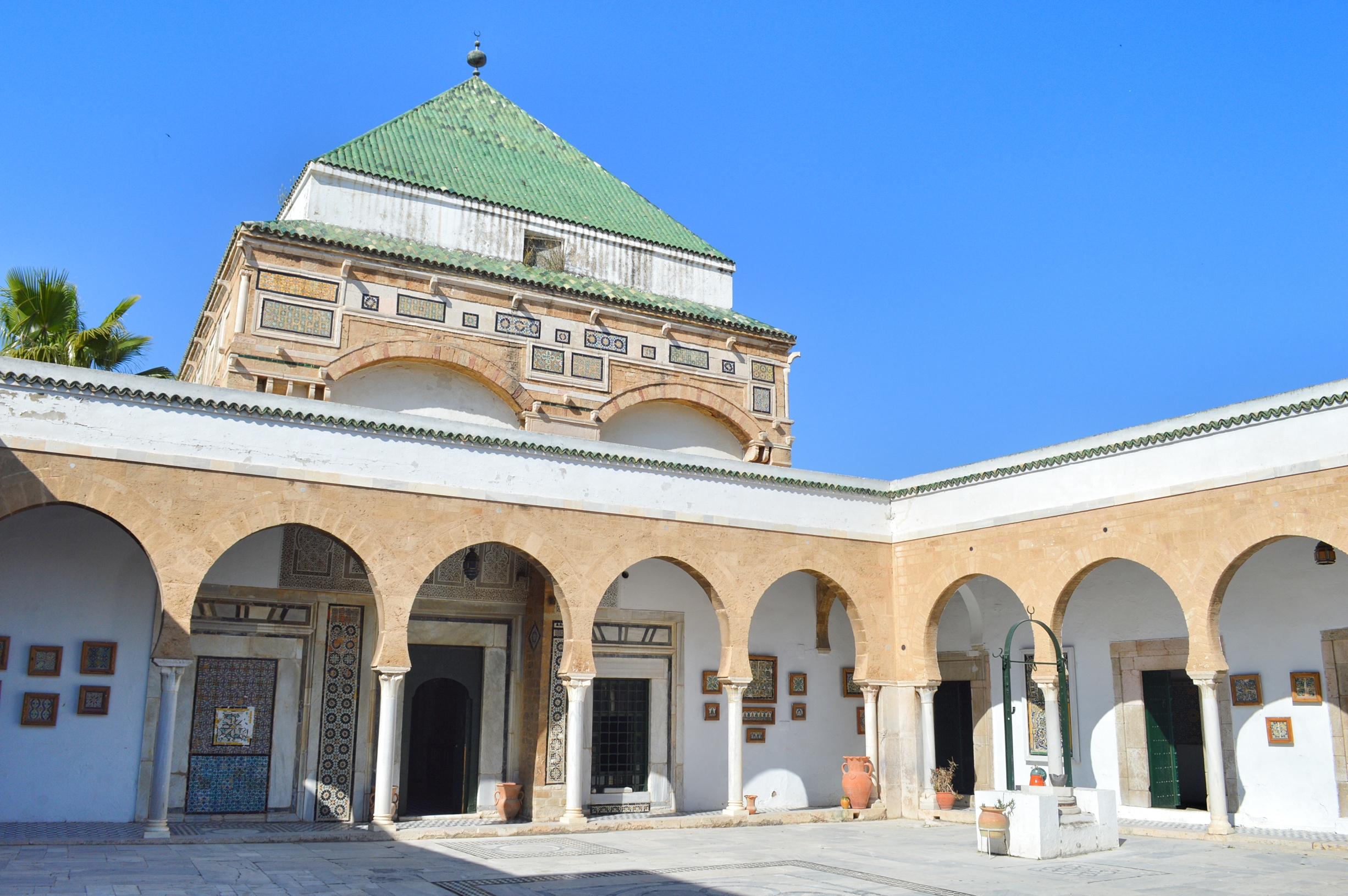
View of the courtyard and mausoleum exterior at the Zawiya of Sidi Qasim al-Jalizi in Tunis (early 18th century)

Under Husayn ibn Ali (r. 1705–1735), founder of the Husaynid dynasty, the Zawiya (mausoleum complex) of Sidi Qasim al-Jalizi, was restored and expanded. A decorated courtyard had previously been added to the mausoleum in the 17th century, and Husayn added to the complex a nine-bay prayer hall.

Husayn's successor, 'Ali Pasha (r. 1740–1765), built four madrasas, more than any other previous ruler in Tunisia. The madrasas he built are distinguished by their rich decoration of marble paneling, carved stucco, and Qallalin tiles. Two of them, the Madrasa al-Bashiya (1752) and the Madrasa as-Slimaniyya (1754), are located behind the Zaytuna Mosque, near his mausoleum.

Most of the Husaynid beys, along with many of their family members and close associates, were buried in a mausoleum known as Turbet el-Bey, which includes decorative details in an Italianate style. One of the last and most impressive Husaynid-era mosques is the Mosque of Yusuf Sahib al-Taba' (one of Hamuda's ministers) in Tunis, built between 1808 and 1814. It is similar again to the Yusuf Dey Mosque, with decoration mixing both local and European influences.

=== Palace and domestic architecture ===
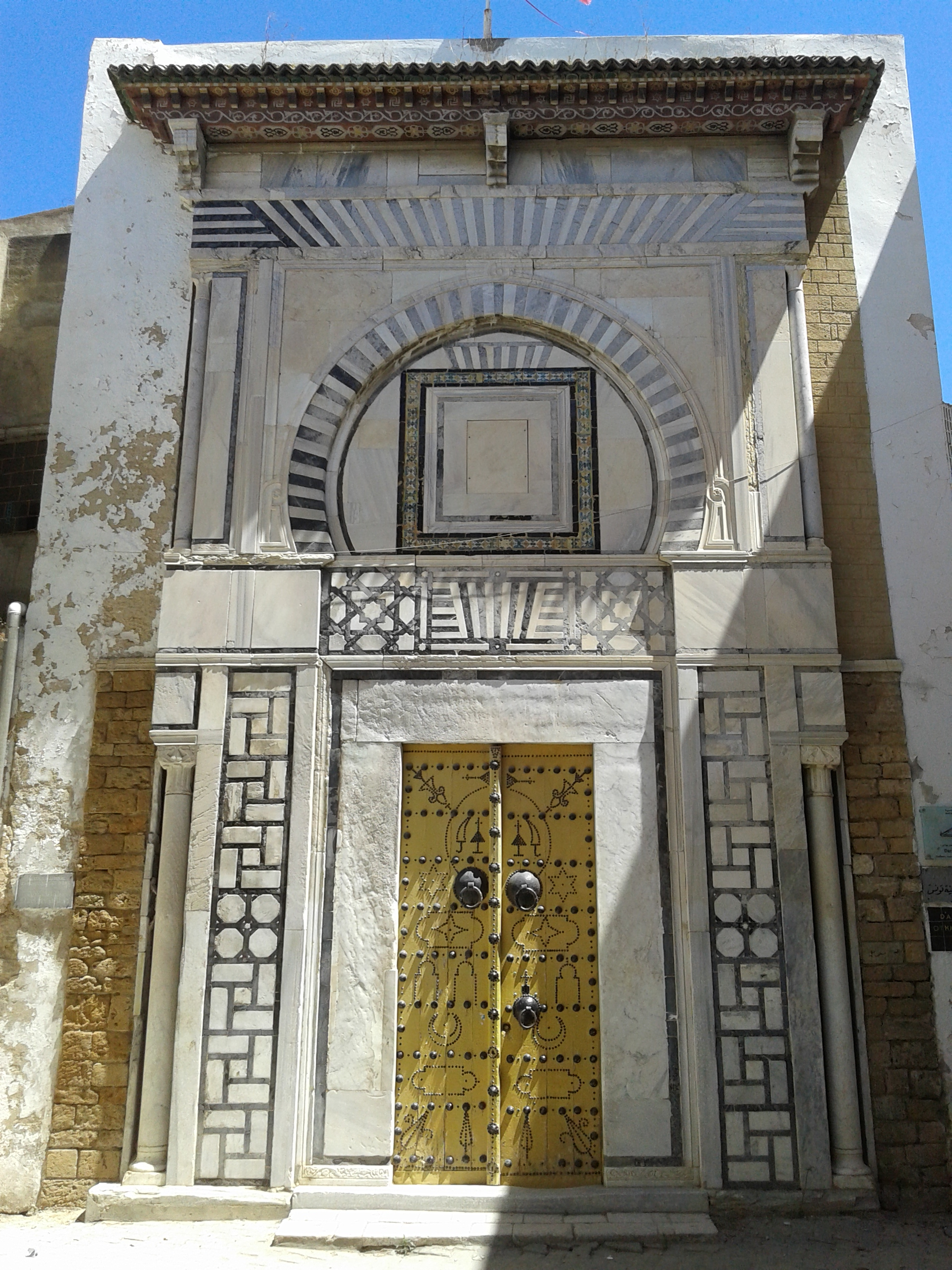
Entrance façade of Dar Othman (between 1594 and 1611)

A notable example of domestic architecture from the early Ottoman period is Dar Othman, a palace built by 'Uthman Dey between 1594 and 1611, with later expansions and restorations. It is notable for the decoration of its entrance, which is faced with black and white marble, recalling 15th-century Hafsid decoration. It has an internal courtyard flanked on two sides by an arcade of horseshoe arches with alternating black and white stone, though this section may date from a later period. Italian and Ottoman/Turkish influences are evident in some of the details and decorative motifs.

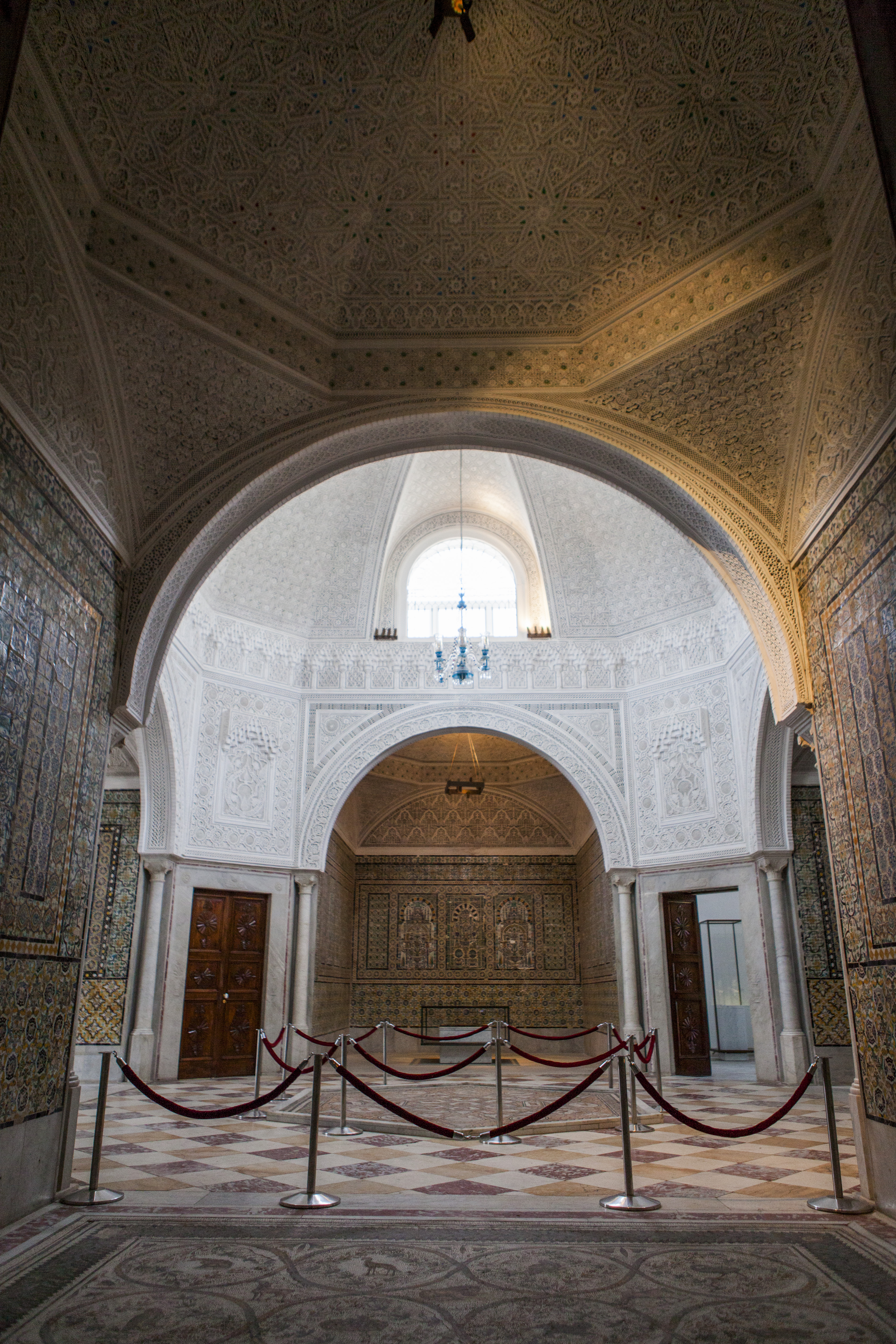
Former reception hall, Dar al-Harim, inside the Bardo Palace (19th century)

Husayn ibn Ali transformed the Bardo Palace into a massive fortified complex with various amenities including a mosque, a madrasa, a hammam and a market. Later beys added further apartments and residences to it. One of these additions, the Dar al-Harim, is a reception hall with a cross-shaped layout and a central dome, something typical of Ottoman palace architecture. The complex continued to be modified up to the 21st century, now housing a national museum and the National Assembly.

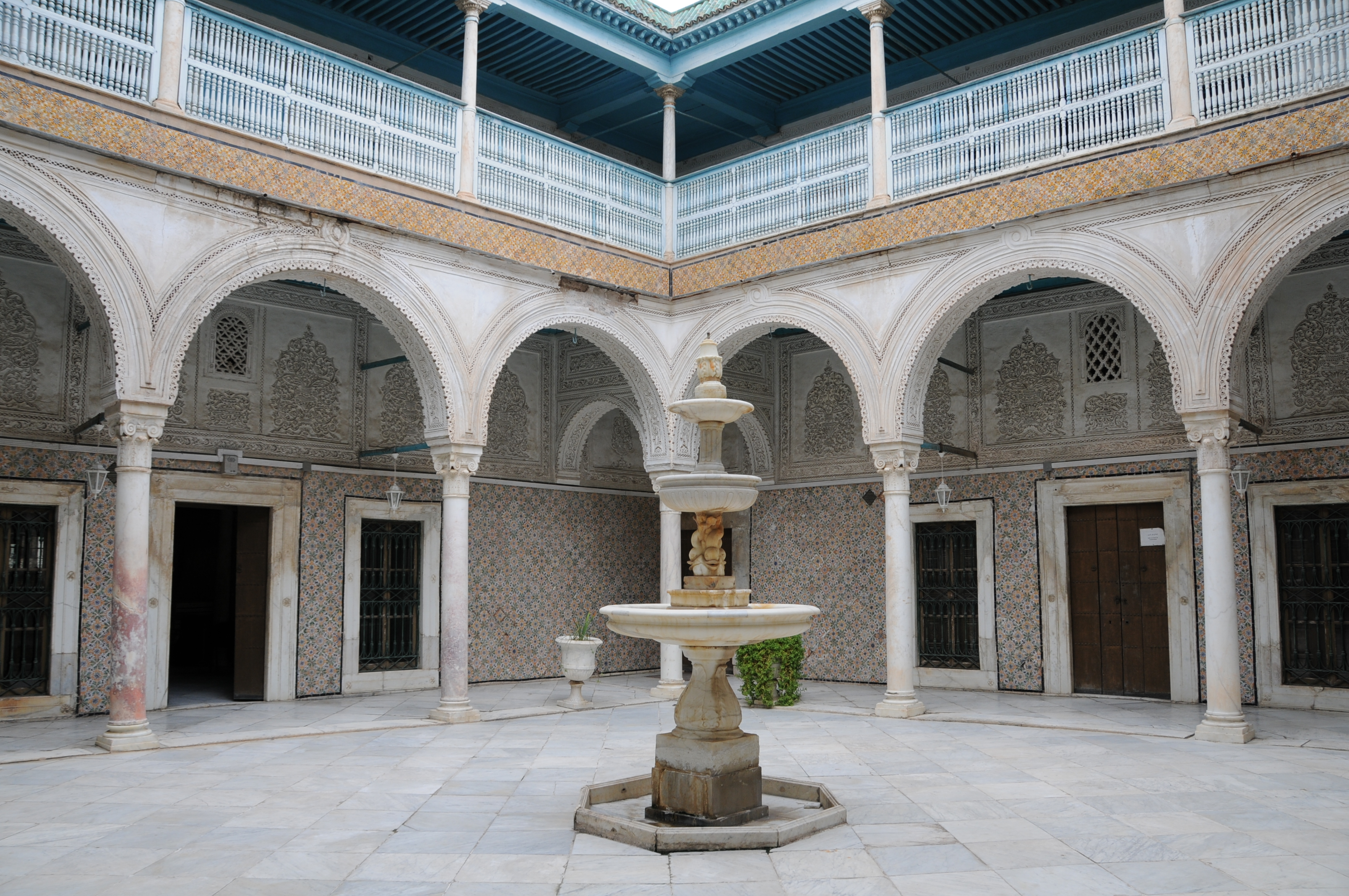
Courtyard of the Dar Ben Abdallah (1796), an example of a traditional private mansion

Various other palaces were also built in Tunis and the surrounding areas in the Husaynid period. 'Ali's son, Hammuda, built another palace, the Dar al-Bey, near the Kasbah of the city, and another one called the Manuba (or Mannouba) Palace. A summerhouse from the latter was relocated in the 19th century to the present-day Belvedere Park in Tunis. Other examples of private mansions built in the old city of Tunis during this period include Dar Hussein, built in the 18th century and expanded and decorated again in the early 19th century, the Dar Ben Abdallah, dated to 1796, and Dar Lasram, built in the early 19th century.

Traditional Tunisian houses of this era, like those of preceding periods, were centered around a square or rectangular interior courtyard, around which most rooms were arranged. Arcaded galleries usually ran along each side of the courtyard, or sometimes on two sides facing each other. The largest rooms were transversal rectangular halls connected to the courtyards, or T-shaped halls with a part of the room projecting outwards at the middle back of the hall. Few windows opened to the outside, with most of the light being provided by the courtyard, and most embellishments were concentrated on the inside.

== Colonial period to present day ==
=== French colonial rule ===
France invaded Tunisia in 1881, imposing the French Protectorate which lasted until 1956. Unlike Algiers, where the French demolished much of the old city after 1830 to build their own colonial edifices, in Tunis the French built their new planned city outside the existing historic walled city. The old city became known as the medina (from the Arabic word for "city") while the new city became known as the Ville Nouvelle (French for "New City"). The new European-built districts across the country were built in contemporary French and European architectural styles, but in many cases architects also constructed buildings in what they considered to be the "Arab" style. The latter style ranged from extravagant pastiches of Moorish/Islamic architecture to more academic designs resulting from study of the country's indigenous architecture. This "Arabizing" (arabisant) architecture (similar to Neo-Moorish) could be seen in many official buildings such as railway stations, post offices, and law courts, as well as in some private villas. One lavish example is the villa designed by Italian millionaire Georges Sebastian in 1939–40 near Hammamet.

=== Independence and present day ===
After the country's independence, and particularly from the 1970s onward, modern architecture predominated for the construction of new blocs of flats, office towers, and hotels. Some architects, such as Tarak ben Miled and Serge Santelli, nonetheless attempted to develop a style that combined ideas from both modern and traditional Tunisian architecture. Many Tunisians also left houses in the medinas to live in modern houses in the new cities that the Europeans had left. Conservation efforts, sometimes aided by UNESCO, began to be put in place to help preserve the historic fabric of historic cities.

== Other local architectural styles ==
=== Southern Tunisia ===
Southern Tunisia, which has a more predominantly Berber (Amazigh) population is dotted with hilltop ksour (fortified villages) and multi-story fortified granaries (ghorfa), such as the examples in Medenine and Ksar Ouled Soltane, which are typically built with loose stone bound by a mortar of clay. These ghorfa consist of multiple vaulted rooms that are built one on top of the other, up to four stories high. The entrances to the rooms all face inward towards the central courtyard or square of the complex. The upper rooms are accessible by staircases. Another type of fortified granary, consisting of a square structure built in stone, was known as a kasbah (fortress).

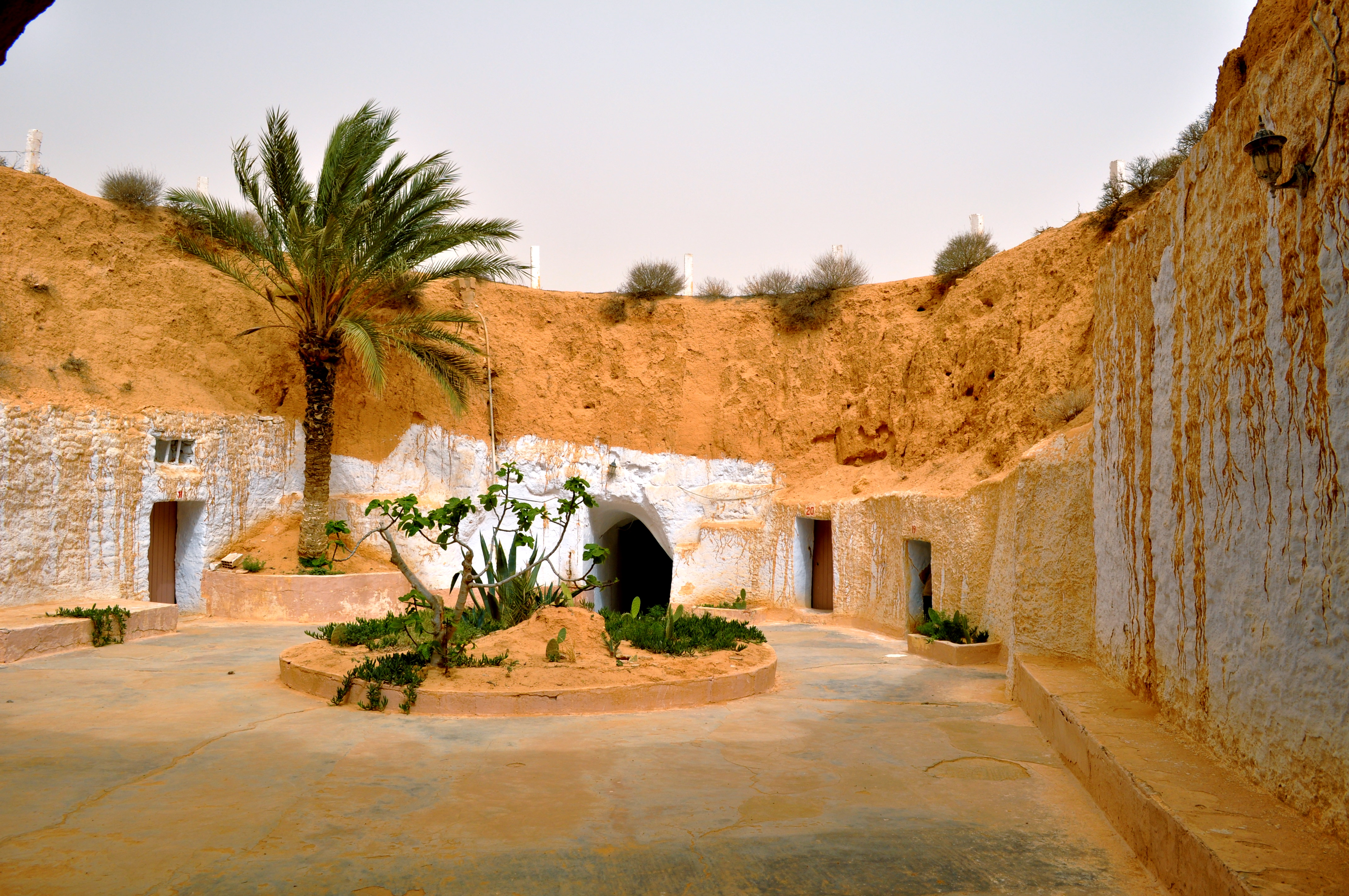
An underground dwelling in Matmata

In some towns – most famously Matmata – the inhabitants traditionally lived in underground dwellings. These consist of circular pits dug into the soft ground, with various rooms dug into the sides of the pit. Historical records mention the existence of such dwellings as far back as the 4th century BC. The pit dwellings were traditionally advantageous for climatic reasons: they were well-isolated from both the desert heat during hot summer days and the cold during winter. The walls of the pit were typically whitewashed in order to reflect sunlight and maximize lighting in the lower levels. There are various accounts and dates concerning the foundation of these settlements by previously nomadic inhabitants of the region. Some estimates place their foundation to around the 14th or 15th century, if not earlier. In the later 20th century many of these homes were abandoned in favour of modern houses, partly due to occurrences of dangerous floods in the 1960s and 1970s that made the underground dwellings unsafe. One of these former underground dwellings was used as a filming location for the first Star Wars movie, serving as the childhood home of Luke Skywalker.

=== Jerba ===
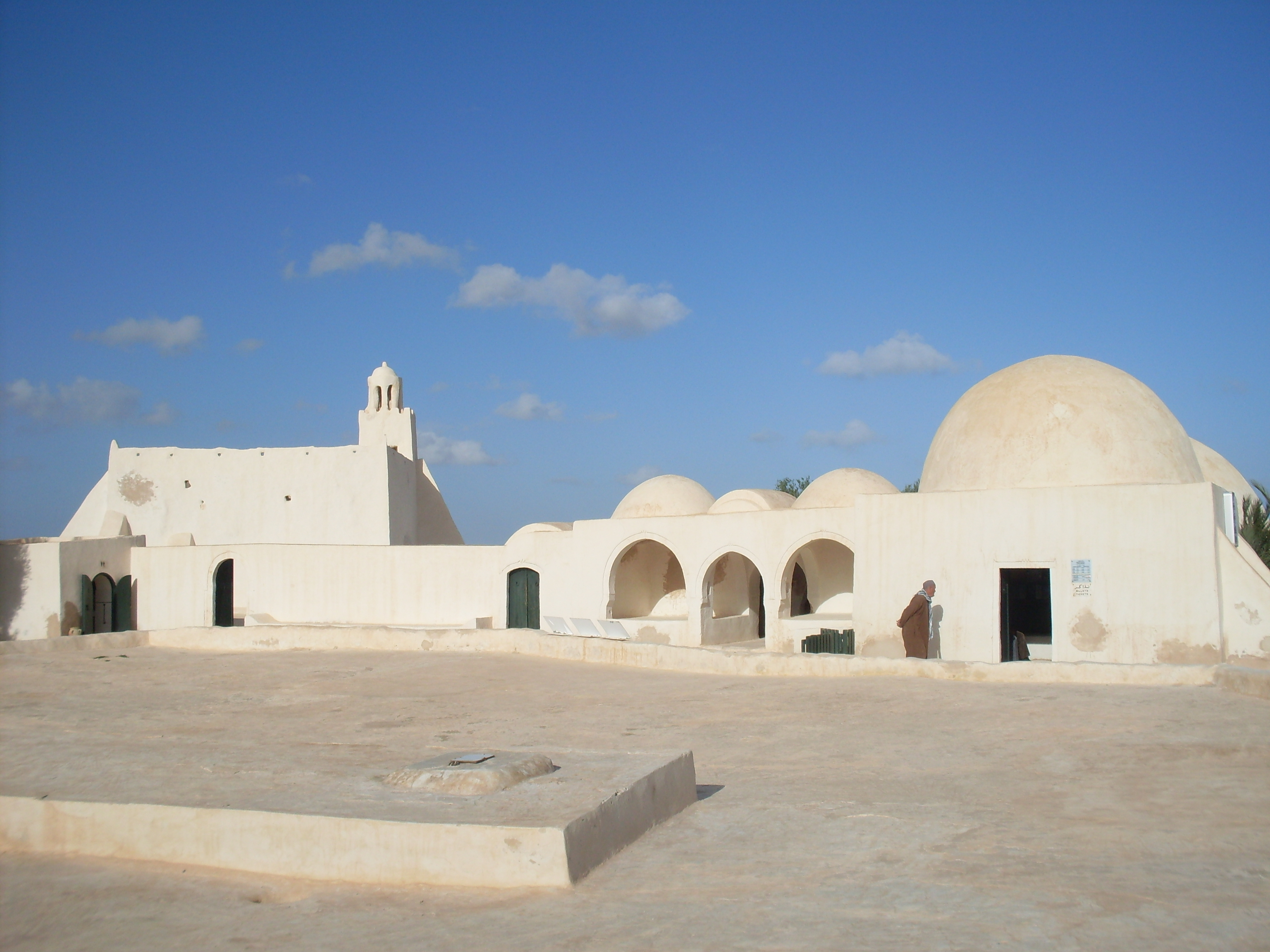
The Fadhloun Mosque in Djerba, an example of a traditional "fortified mosque"

The island of Jerba in Tunisia, traditionally dominated by Ibadi Berbers, has a traditional style of mosque architecture that consists of low-lying structures built in stone, roofed with barrel vaults, and covered in whitewash. Their prayer halls are domed and they have short, often round minarets. The mosques are often described as "fortified mosques" because the island's flat topography made it vulnerable to attacks and as a result the mosques were designed partly to act as watch posts along the coast and in the countryside.
