= Dar Ben Abdallah =

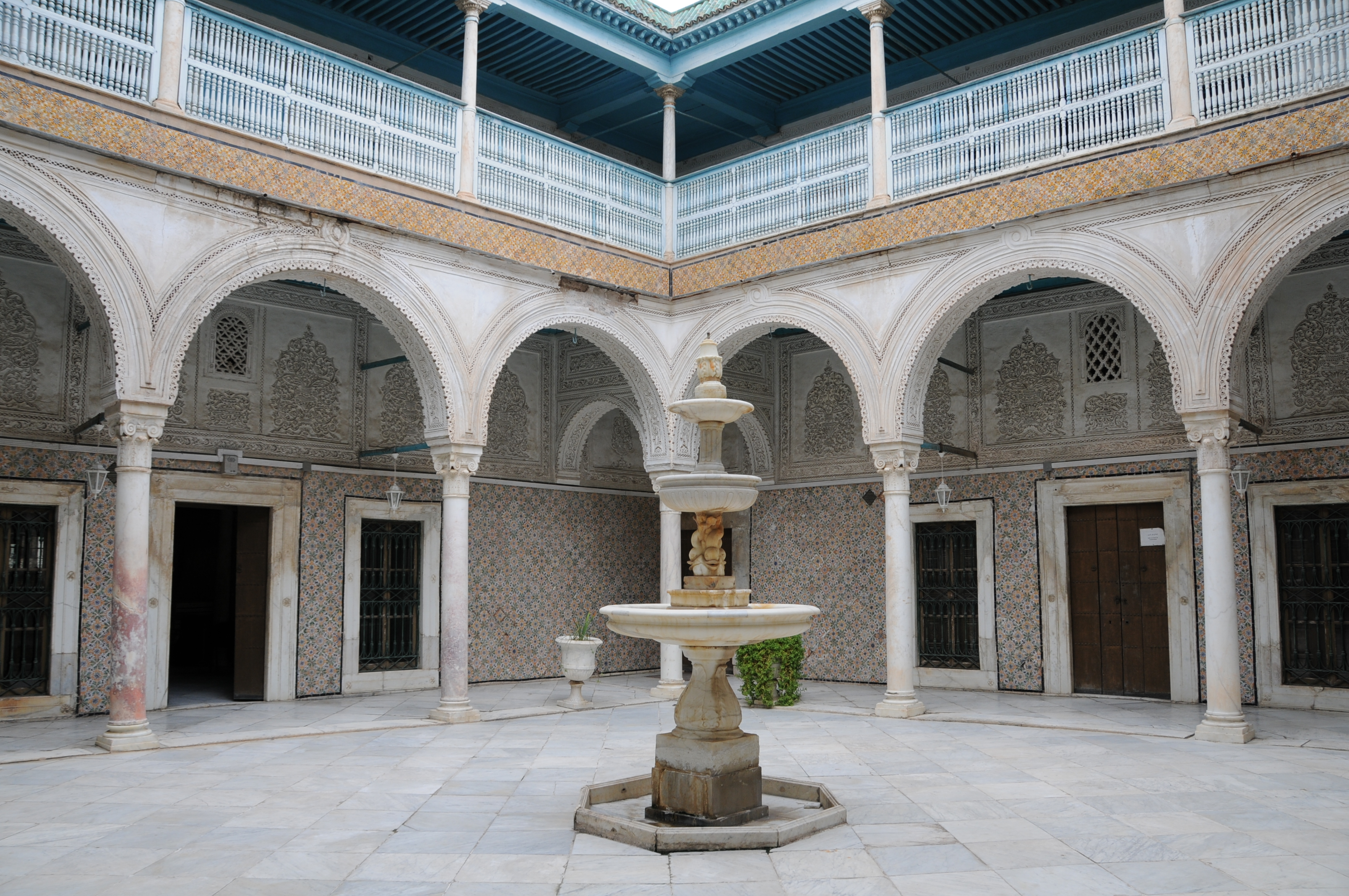
- Interactive map of the Dar Ben Abdallah area

General information
- Type: Palace
- Architectural style: Moorish architecture Tunisian architecture
- Location: Medina of Tunis, Tunis, Tunisia
- Year built: 1796
- Client: Mohamed El Bradaï El Ksontini

Dar Ben Abdallah (Arabic: دار بن عبد الله) is an old palace in the medina of Tunis.

== Localization ==
It is located in the south district of the Medina of Tunis, near Tourbet El Bey.

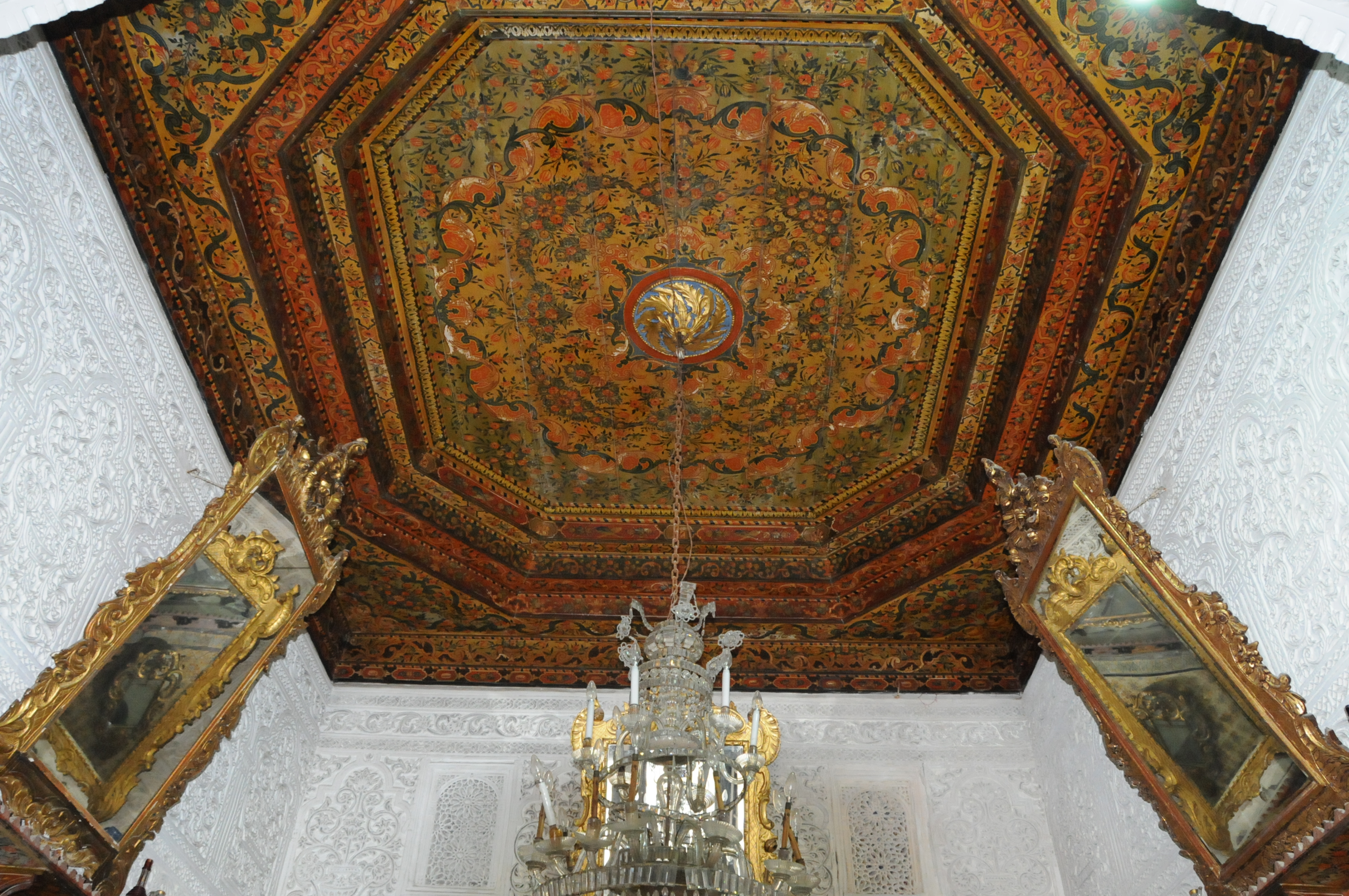
Rooftop of the Kbou

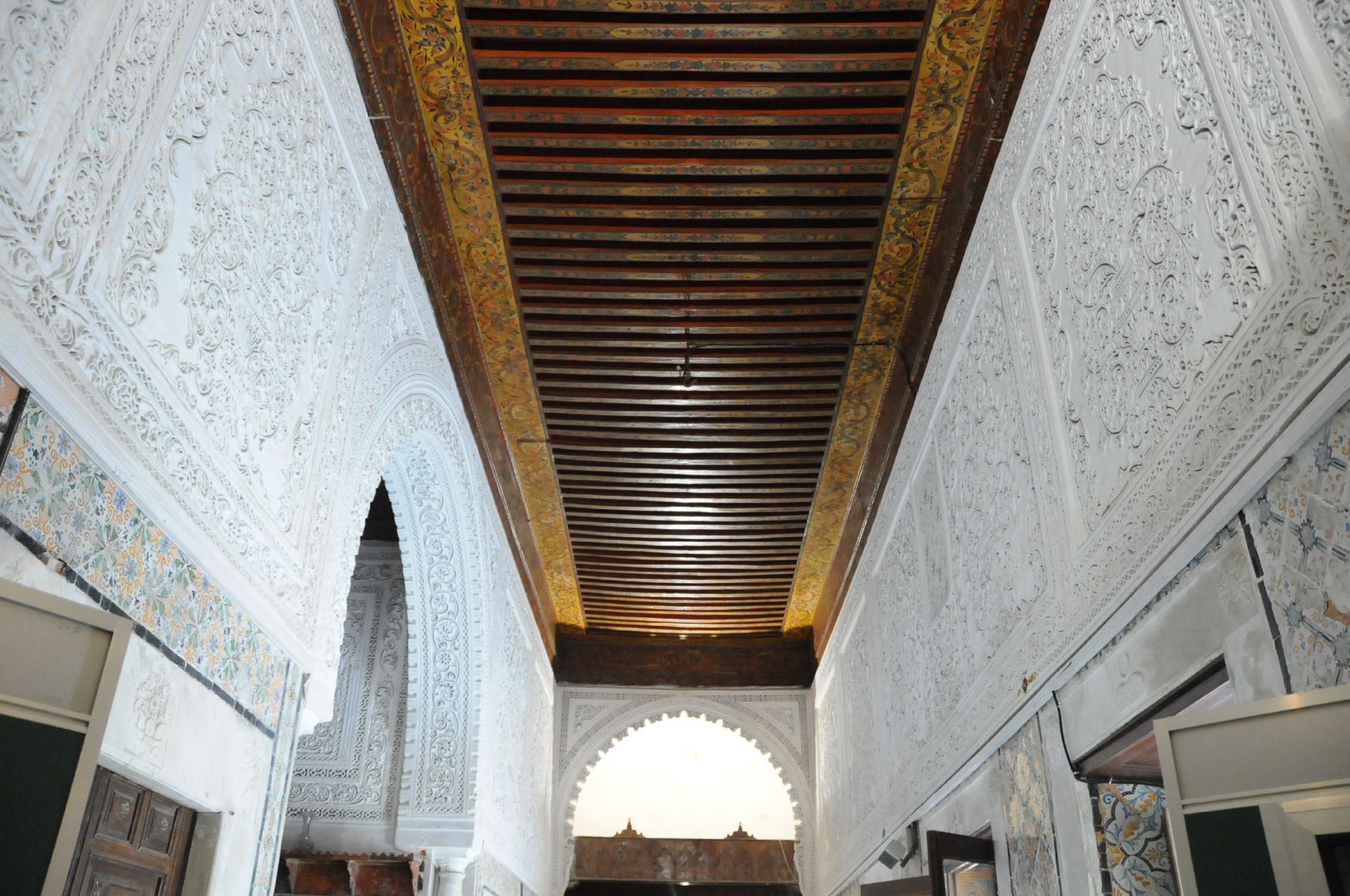
Rooftop of a gallery

== History ==
The palace was built during the 18th century by a noble, Mohamed El Bradaï El Ksontini who later sold it to Slimane Kahia, a general in the Tunisian army. But it got its current name from its last owner, the rich silk trader Mohamed Tahar Ben Abdallah. In 1964, the office of Tunisian arts bought the house and made it the popular arts and traditions museum of Tunis.

== Museum ==
In 1978, the palace got transformed into a museum exposing the daily life of tunisian nobles of the Medina of Tunis in the 19th and the 20th century.

It is divided into 2 sections: one for the family life and the traditions while the other is for the public life of the city and its institutions (souks, mosques, coffee shops).

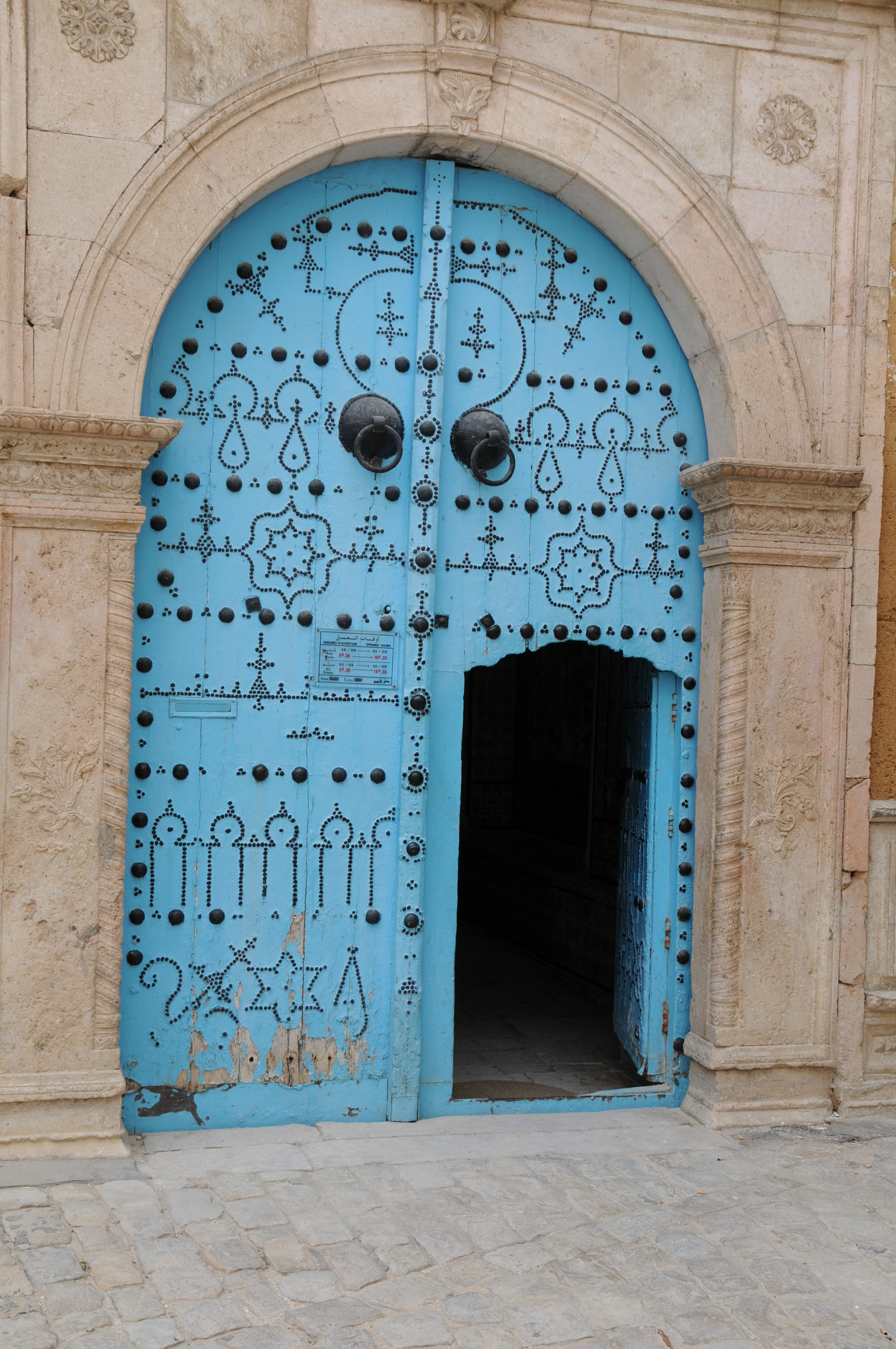
Entrance of Dar Ben Abdallah

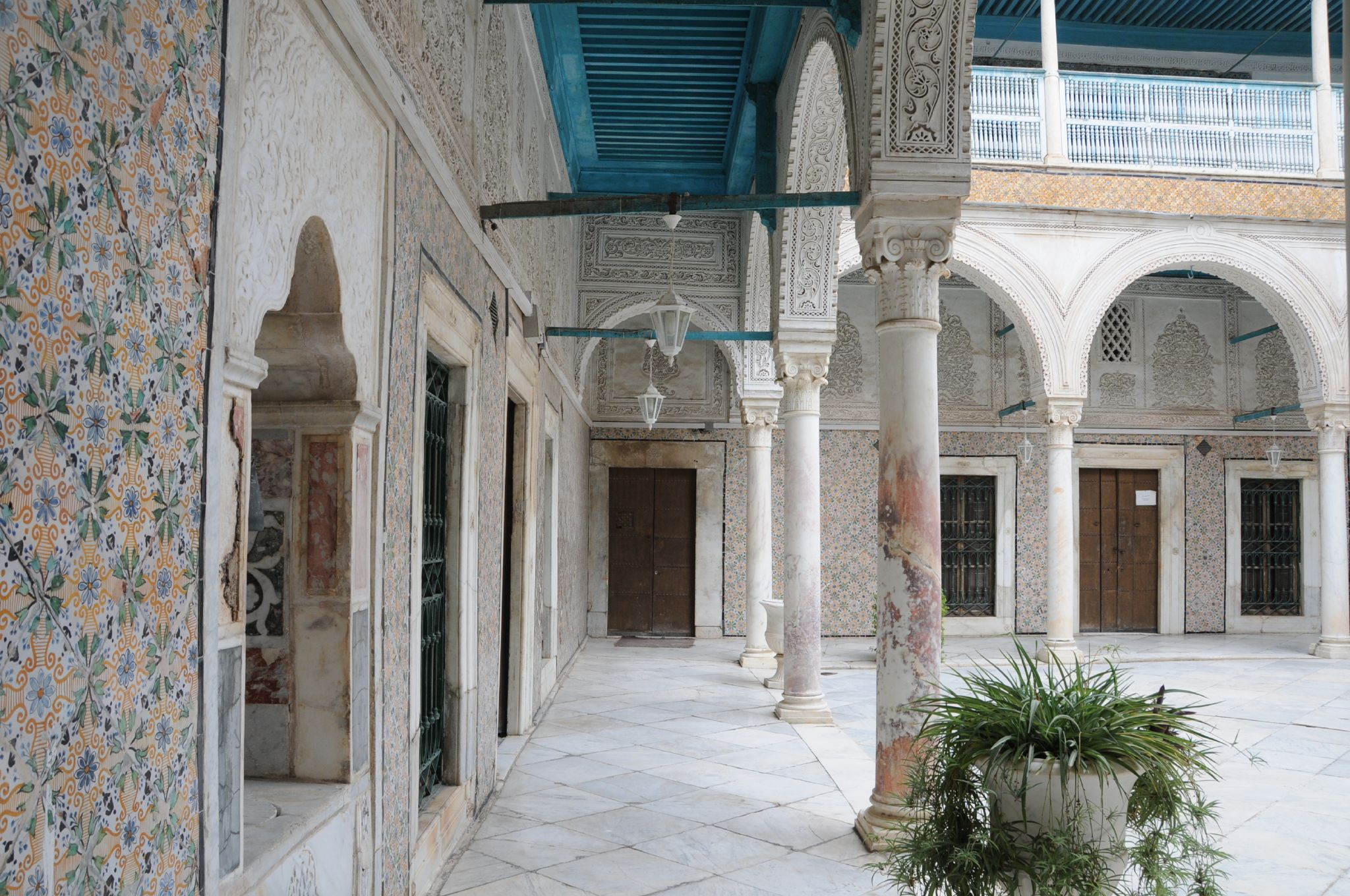
Portico of the hall

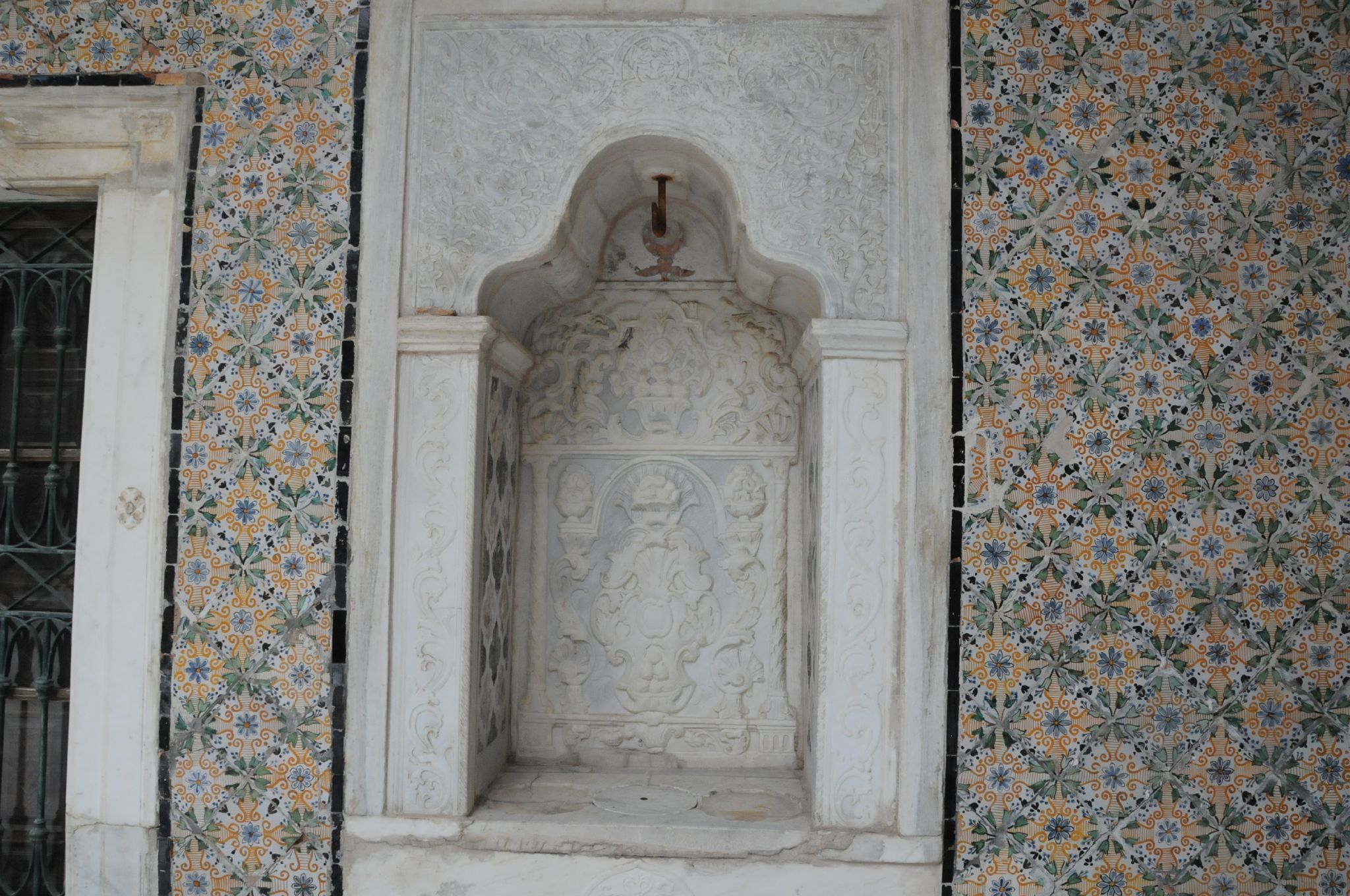
Niche of the hall

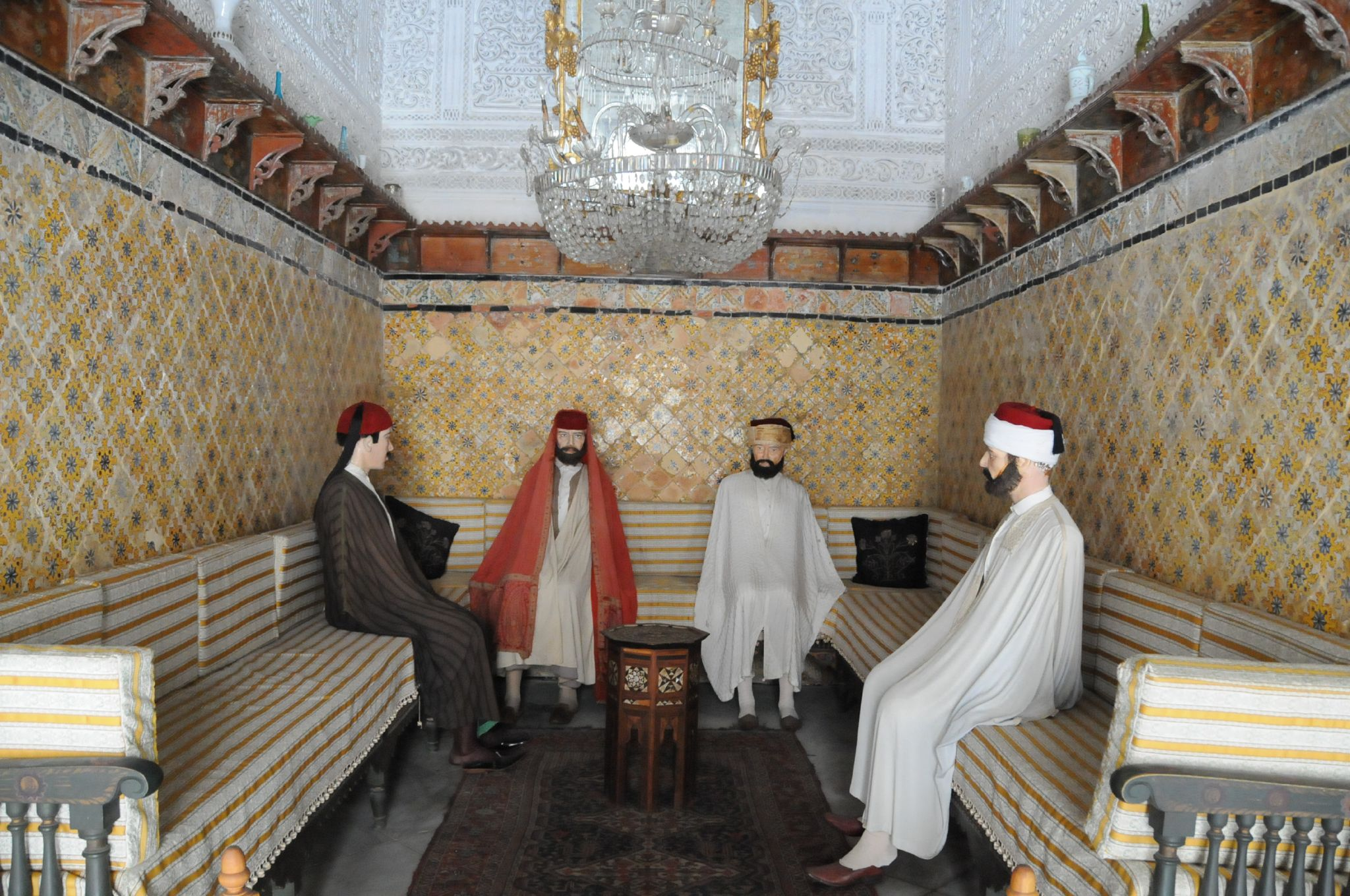
A scene of daily life

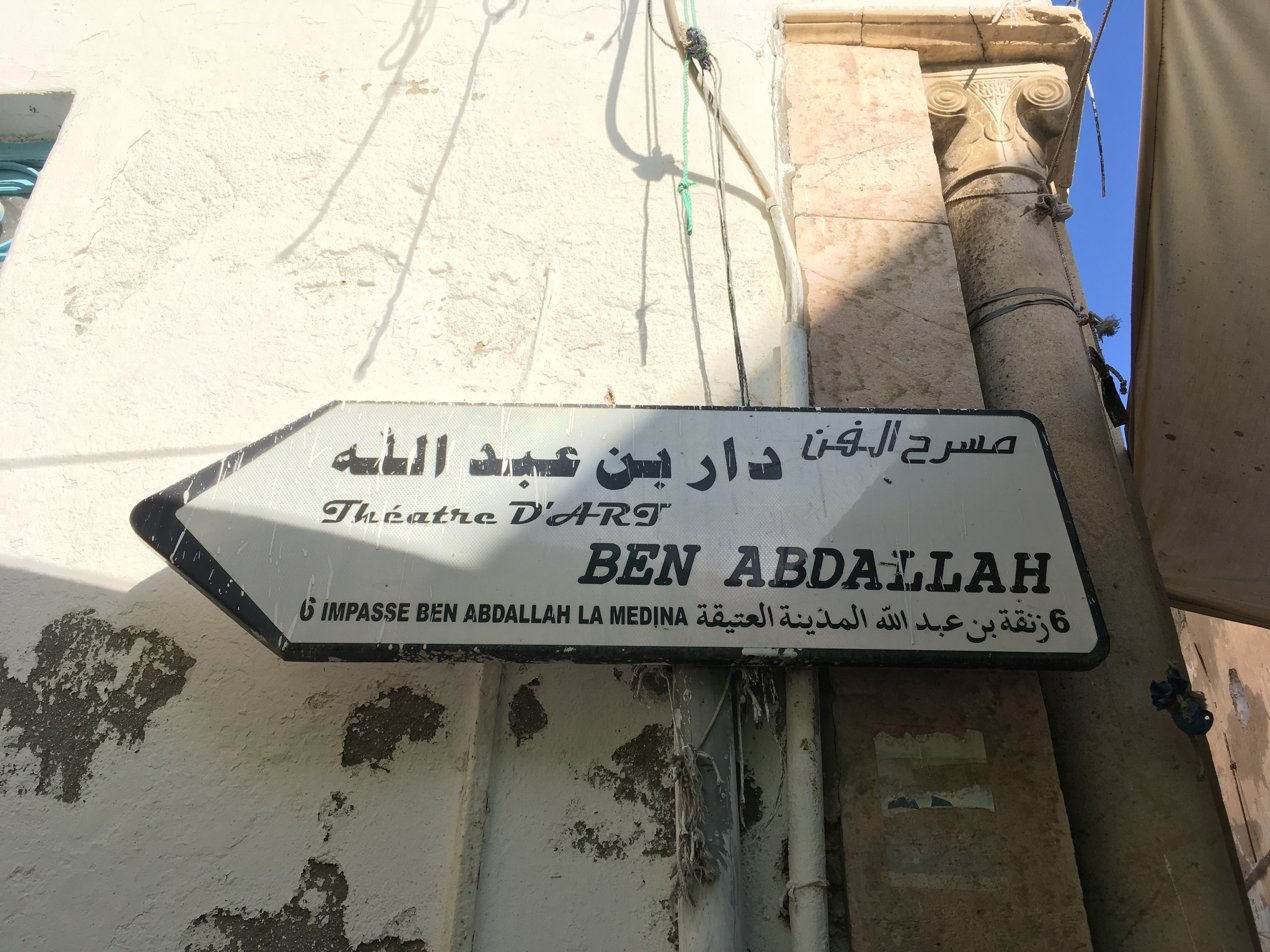
Metallic plaque of Dar Ben Abdallah
