= Al Haliq Mosque =

Mosque in Tunis, Tunisia

- جامع الحلق
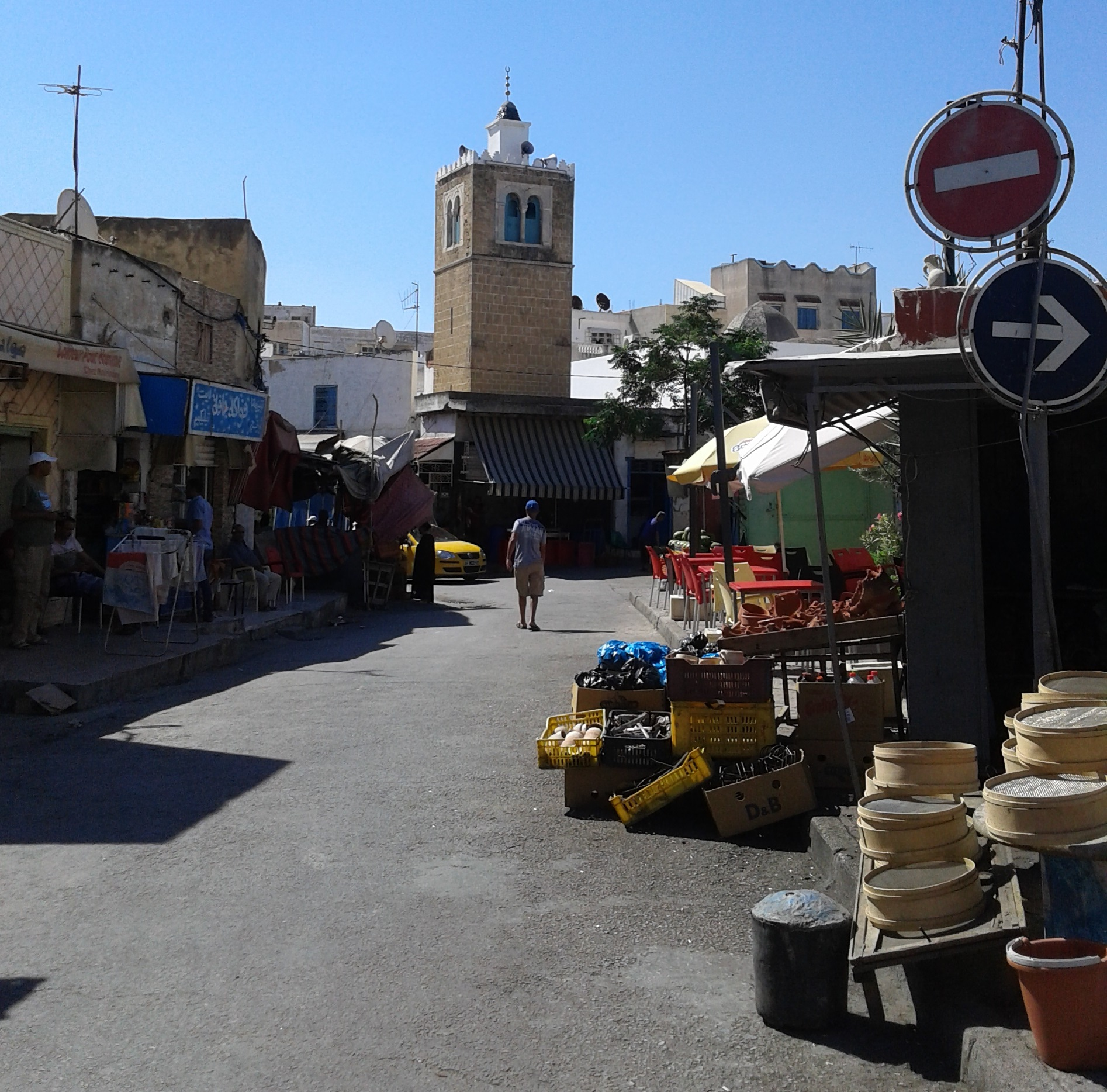

- Location within Tunisia

Religion
- Affiliation: Islam
- Branch/tradition: Sunni

Location
- Location: Tunis, Tunisia
- Coordinates: 36.791953888889°N 10.170541111111°E

Architecture
- Type: Mosque

The Al Haliq Mosque (Arabic: جامع الحلق) is a mosque in Tunis, Tunisia, located in the Sidi El Bechir arrondissement.

== Localization ==
The mosque is located near Bab Jedid and Al Marr Street. According to legend, a widow sold her jewels to finance its construction, hence the name of "Haliq", meaning "rings of a gold ornament".

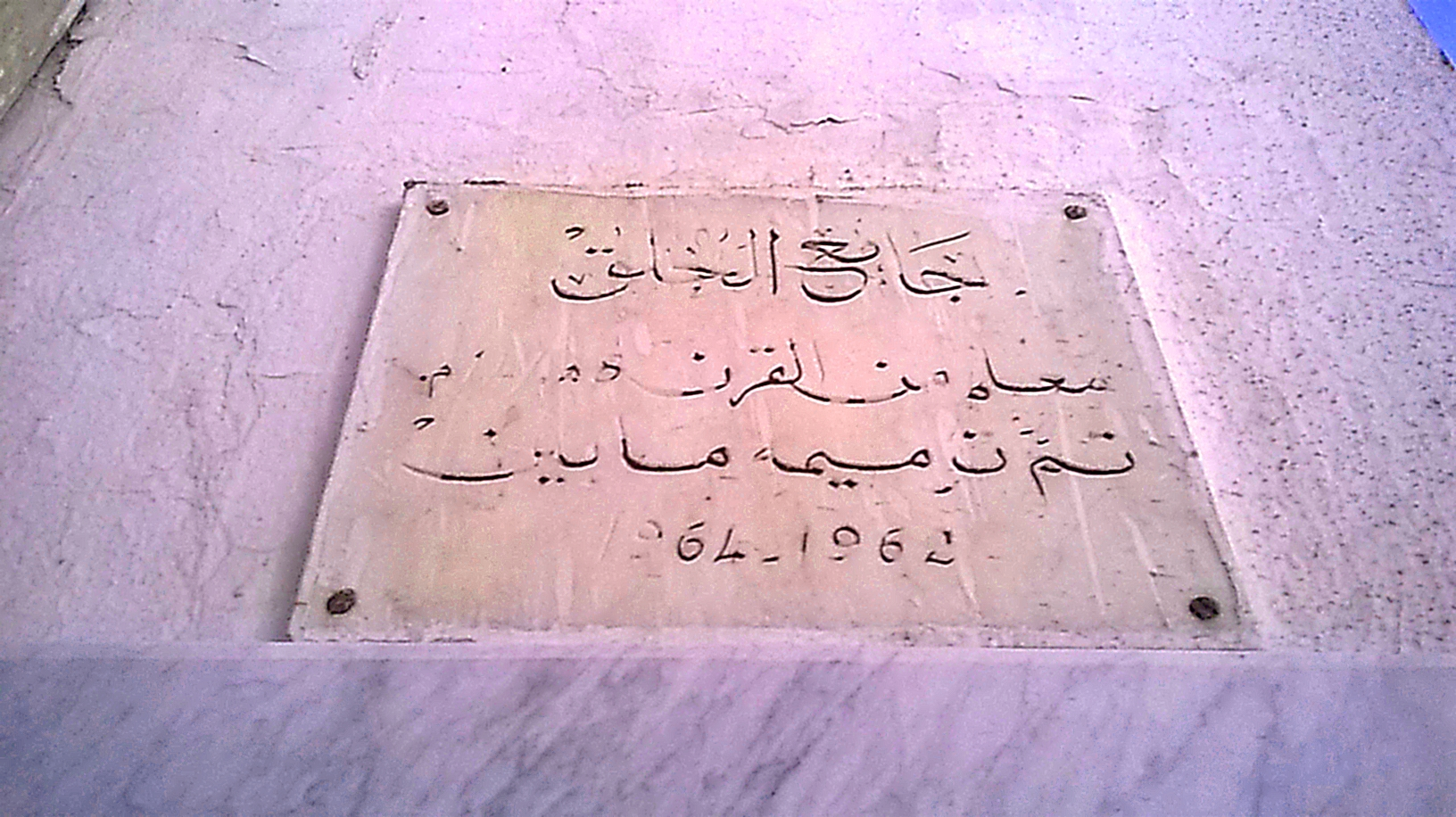
Commemorative plaque of the mosque

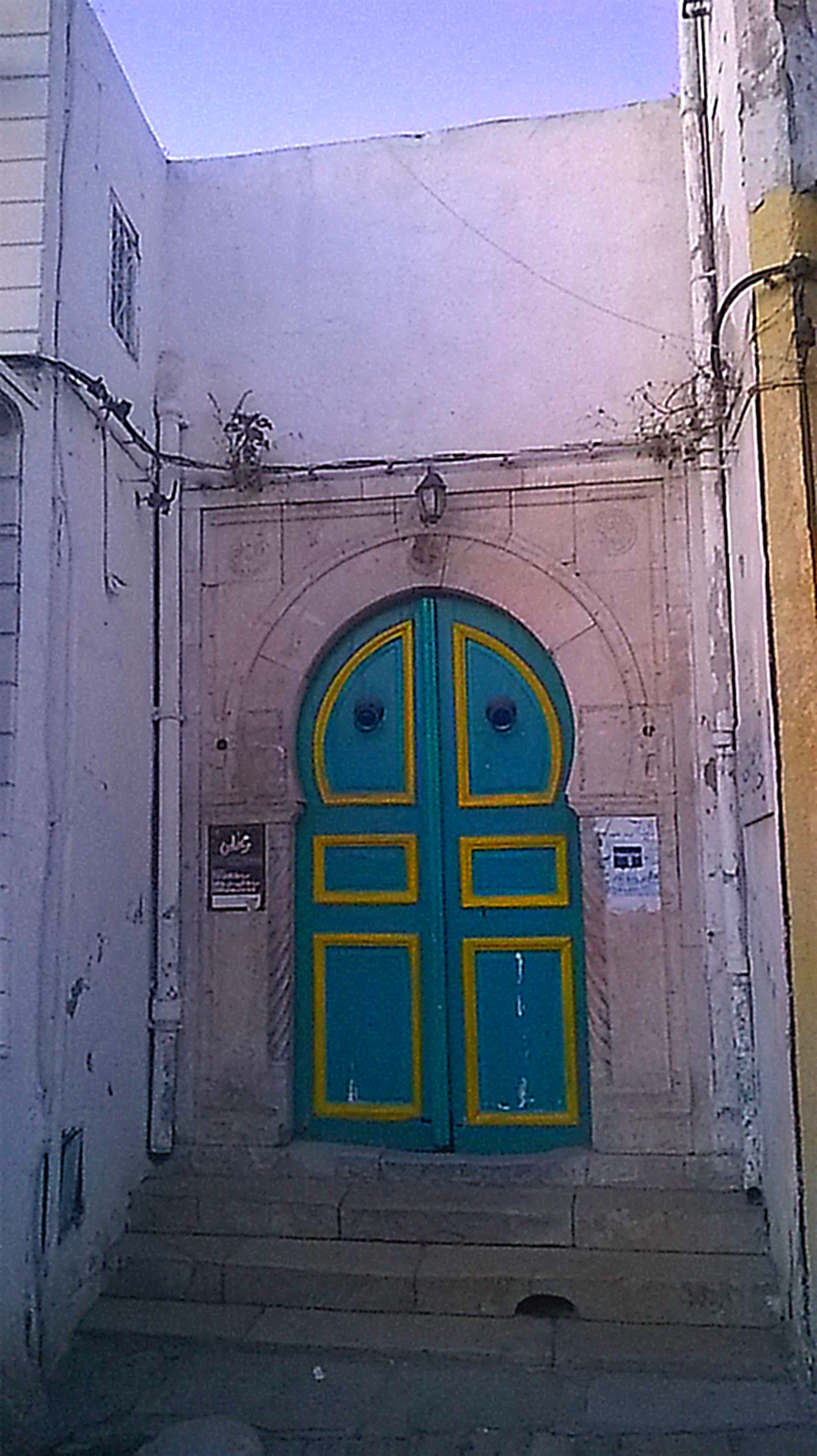
Gate of the mosque

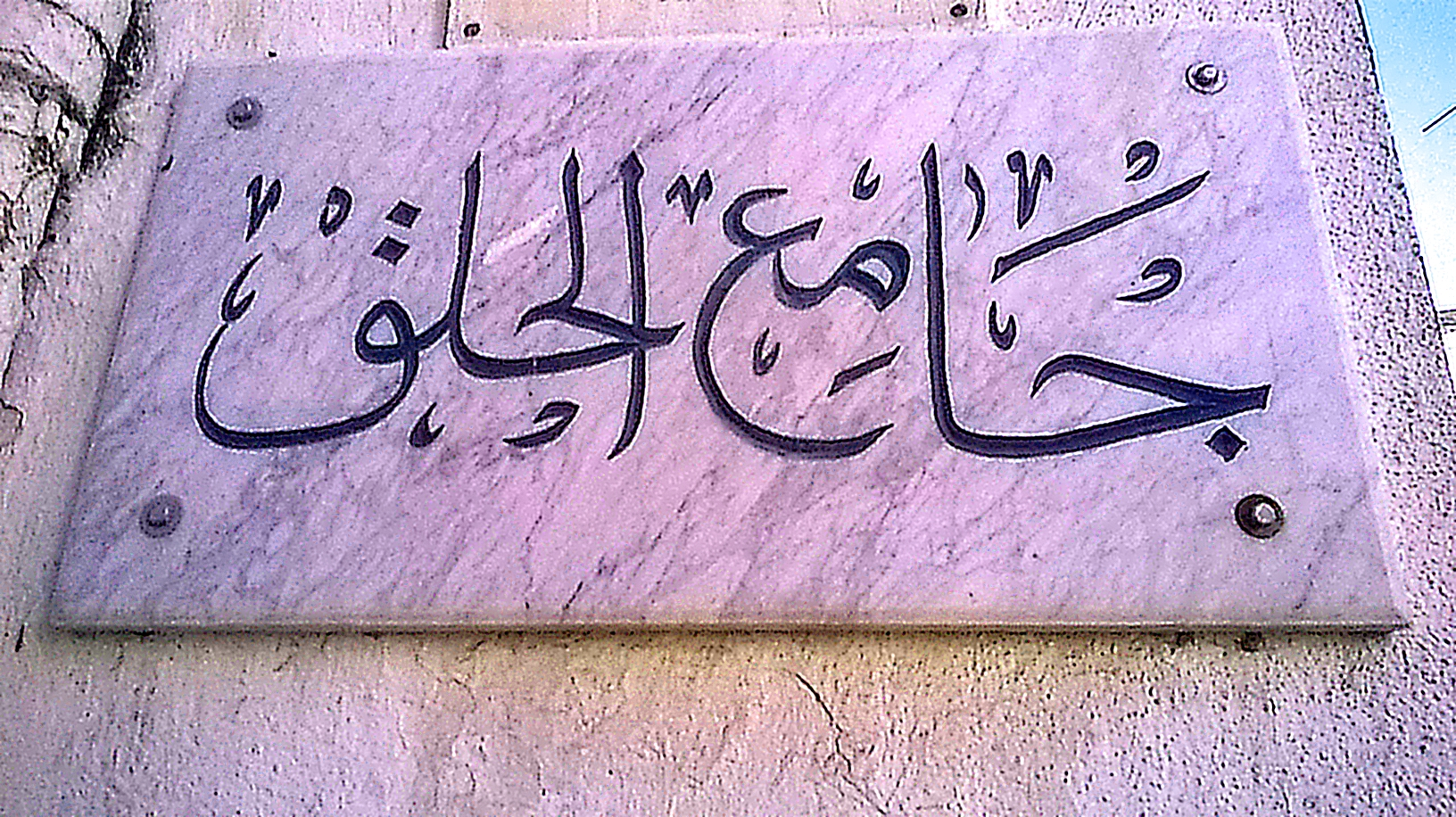
Marble plaque indicating the name of the mosque

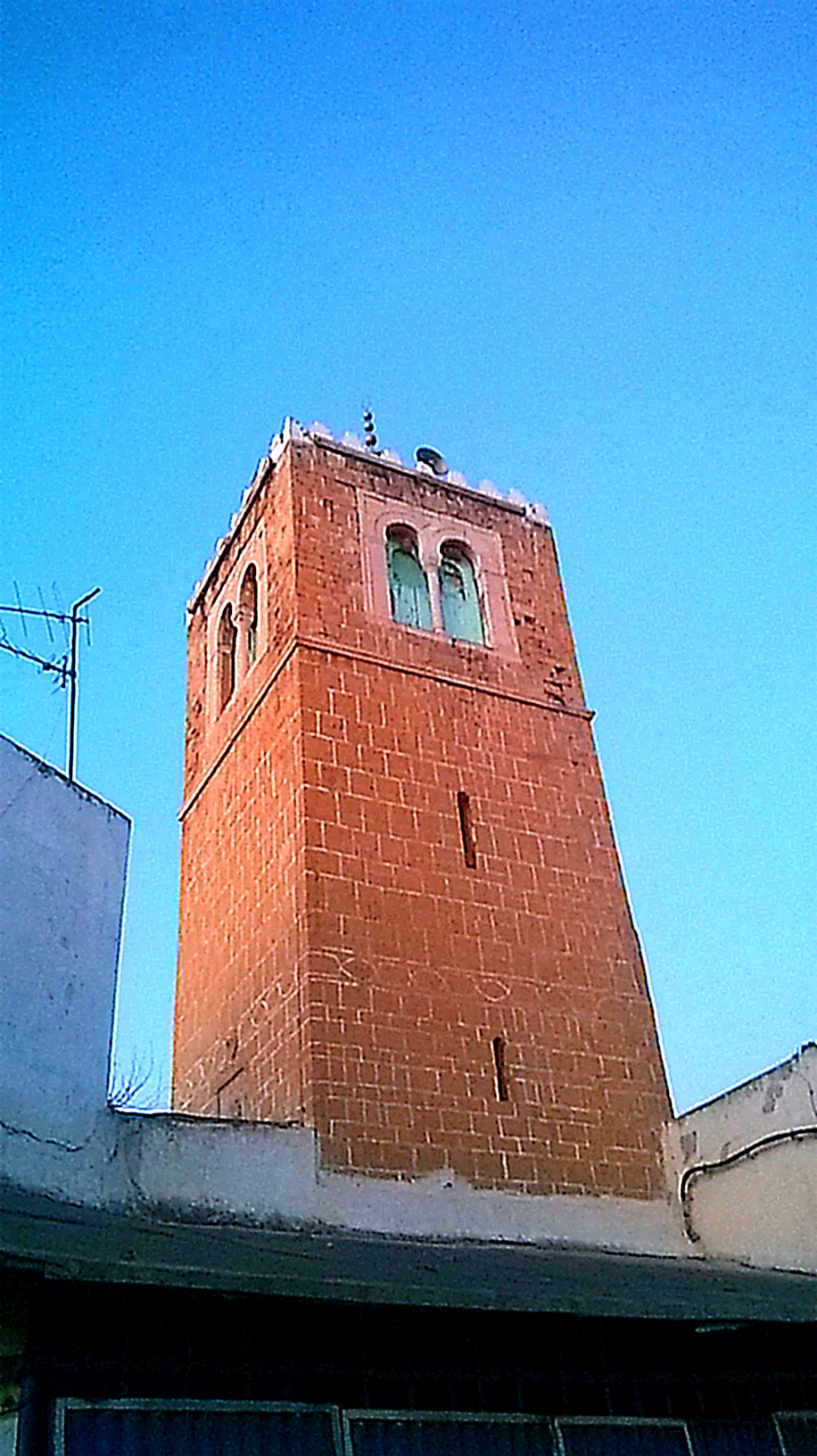
Minaret of the mosque
