= Souk El Haddadine =

Souq in Tunis, Tunisia

Coordinates: 36.792773°N 10.171493°E

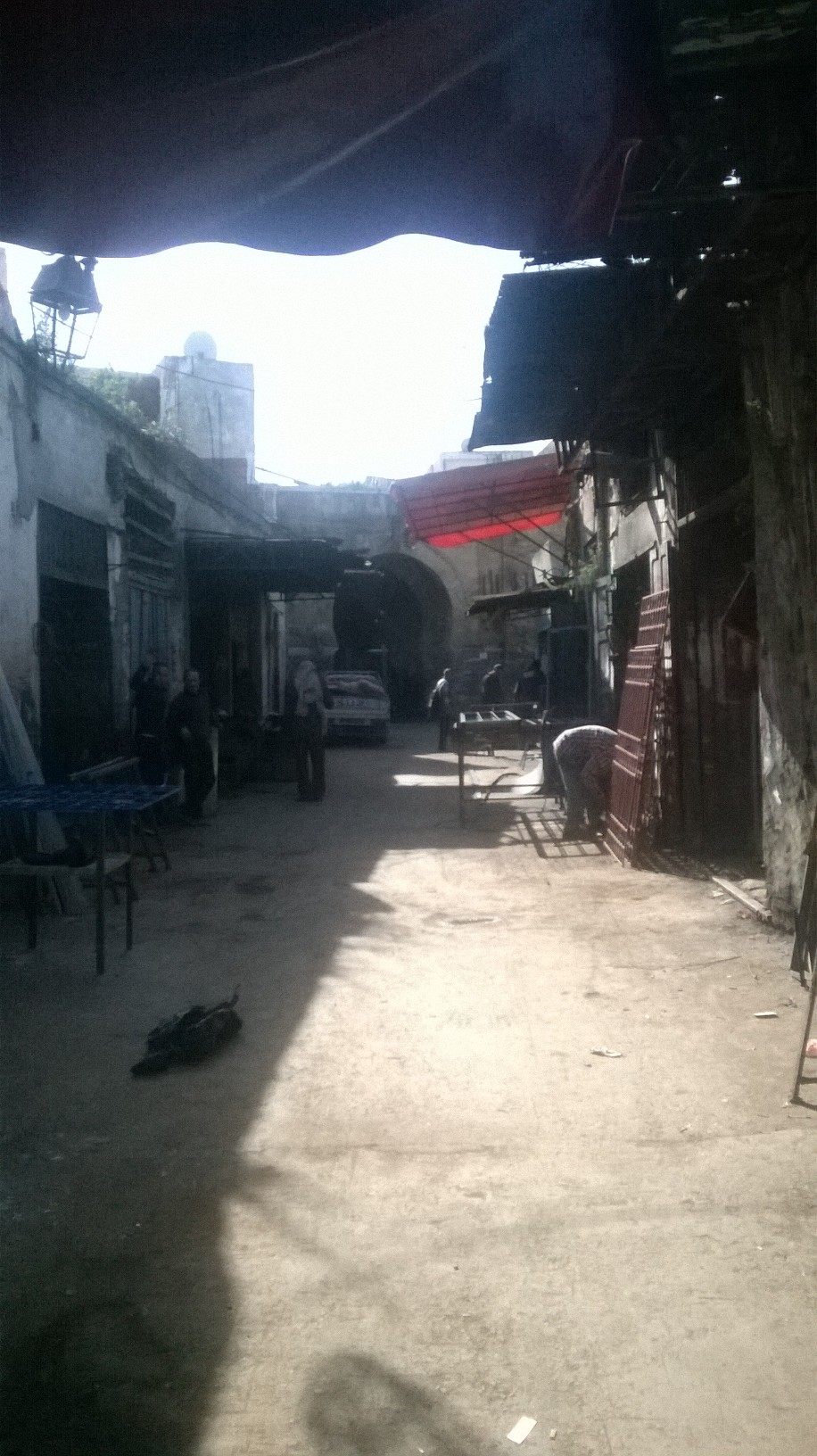
Souk El Haddadine at the end of Bab Jedid

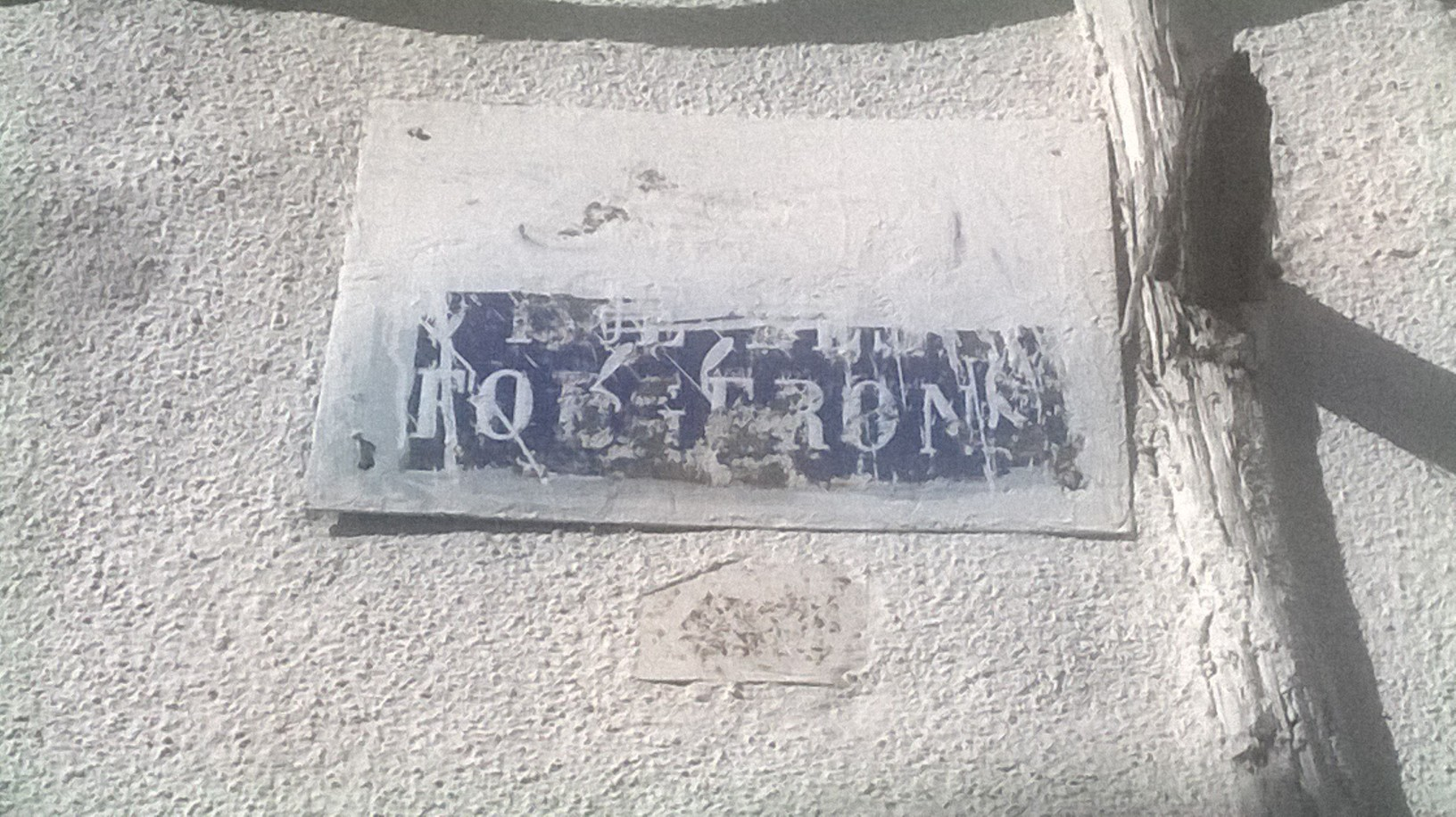
Metallic plaque of the Smiths Street

Souk El Haddadine or souk of the smiths is one of the souks of the medina of Tunis.

== Location ==
It is located in the southern part of the medina, in the Smiths Street.

== History ==
The souk was founded during the Hafsid era between 1128 and 1535.

== Products ==
It is specialized in producing metal products.

== Monuments ==
The souk is located near Bab Jedid, one of the medina's famous gates. Also, Sidi Mahrez Khelloua Mosque, a classified monument is in this souk.

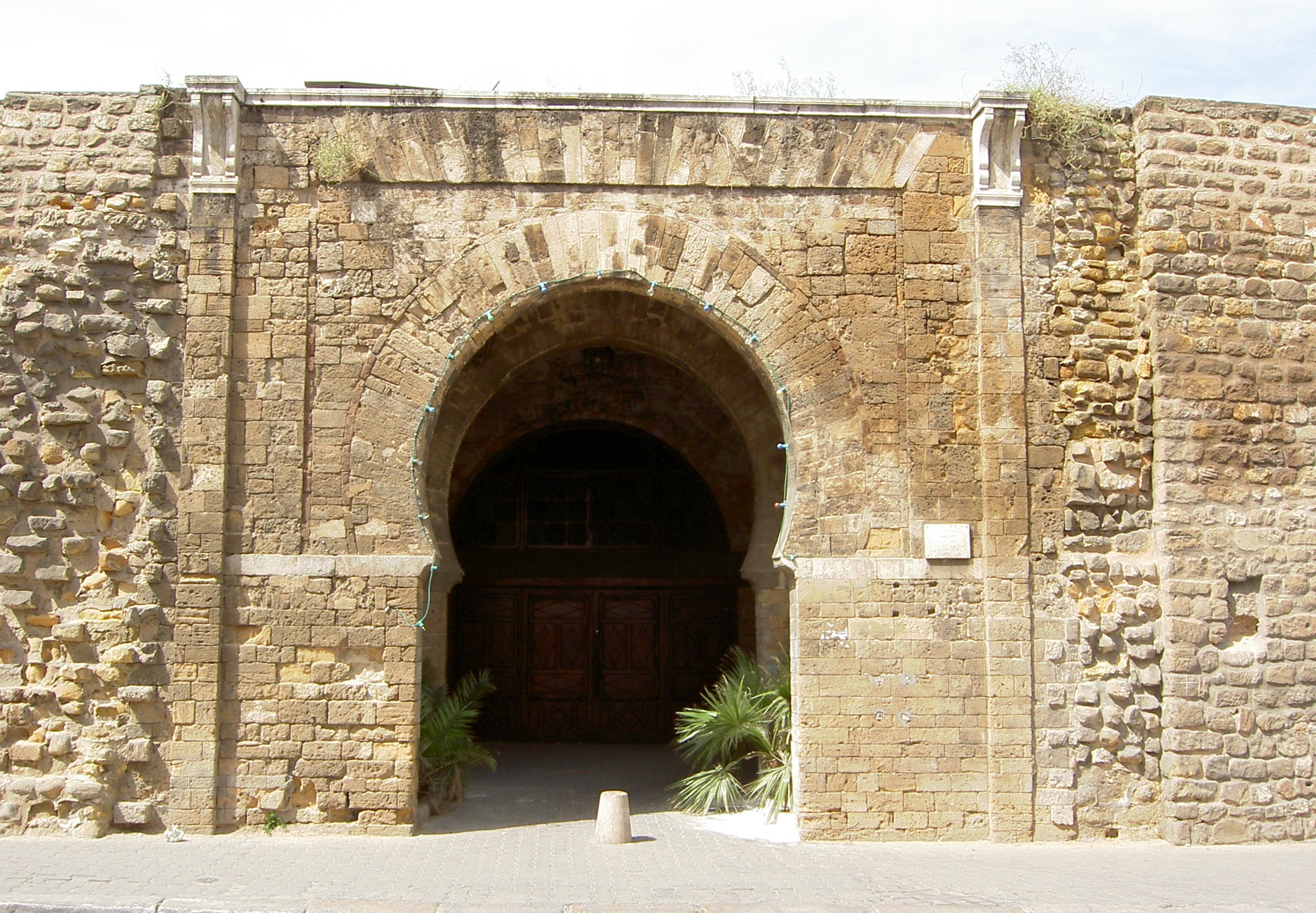
Bab Jedid

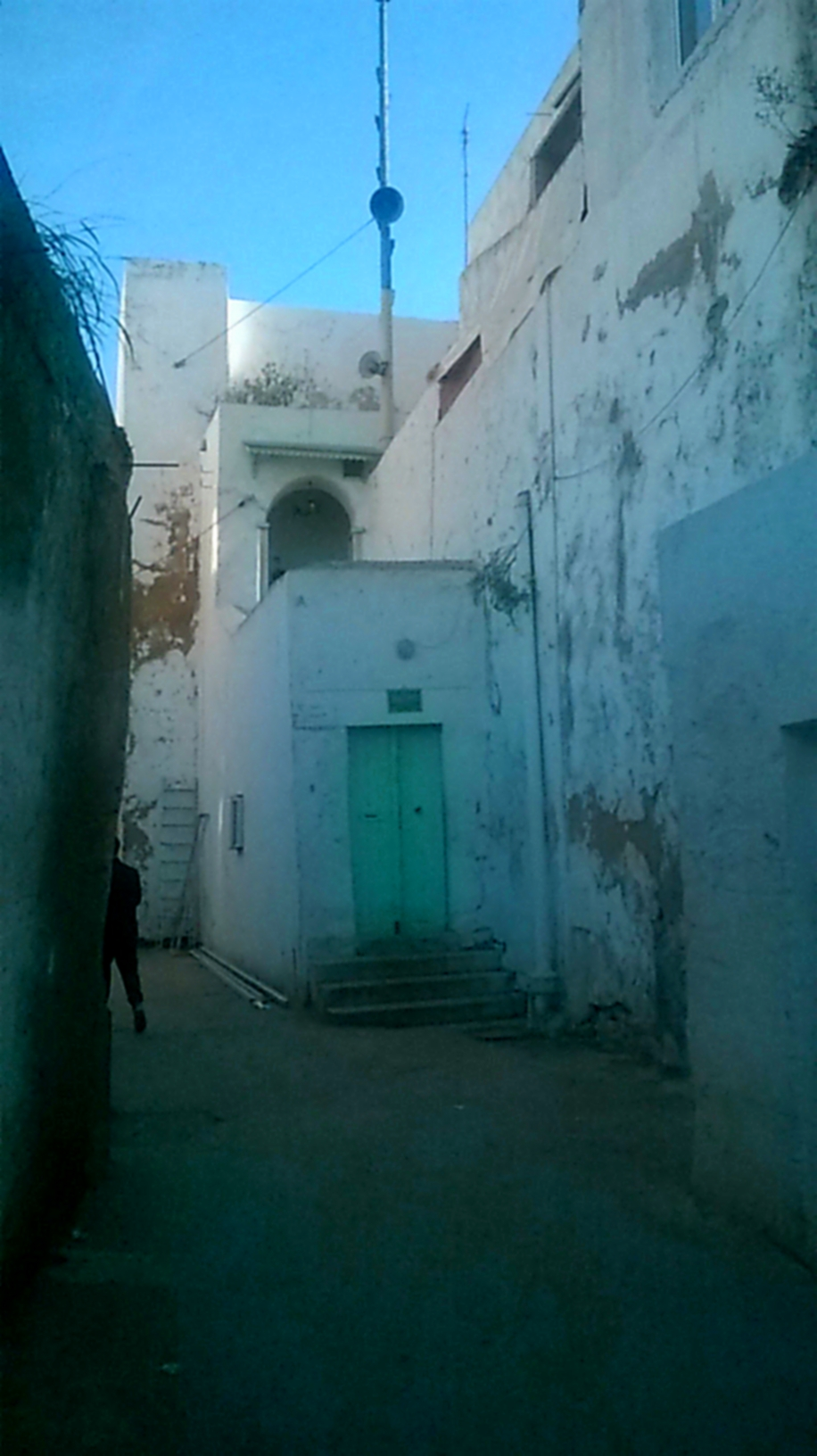
Sidi Mahrez Khelloua Mosque

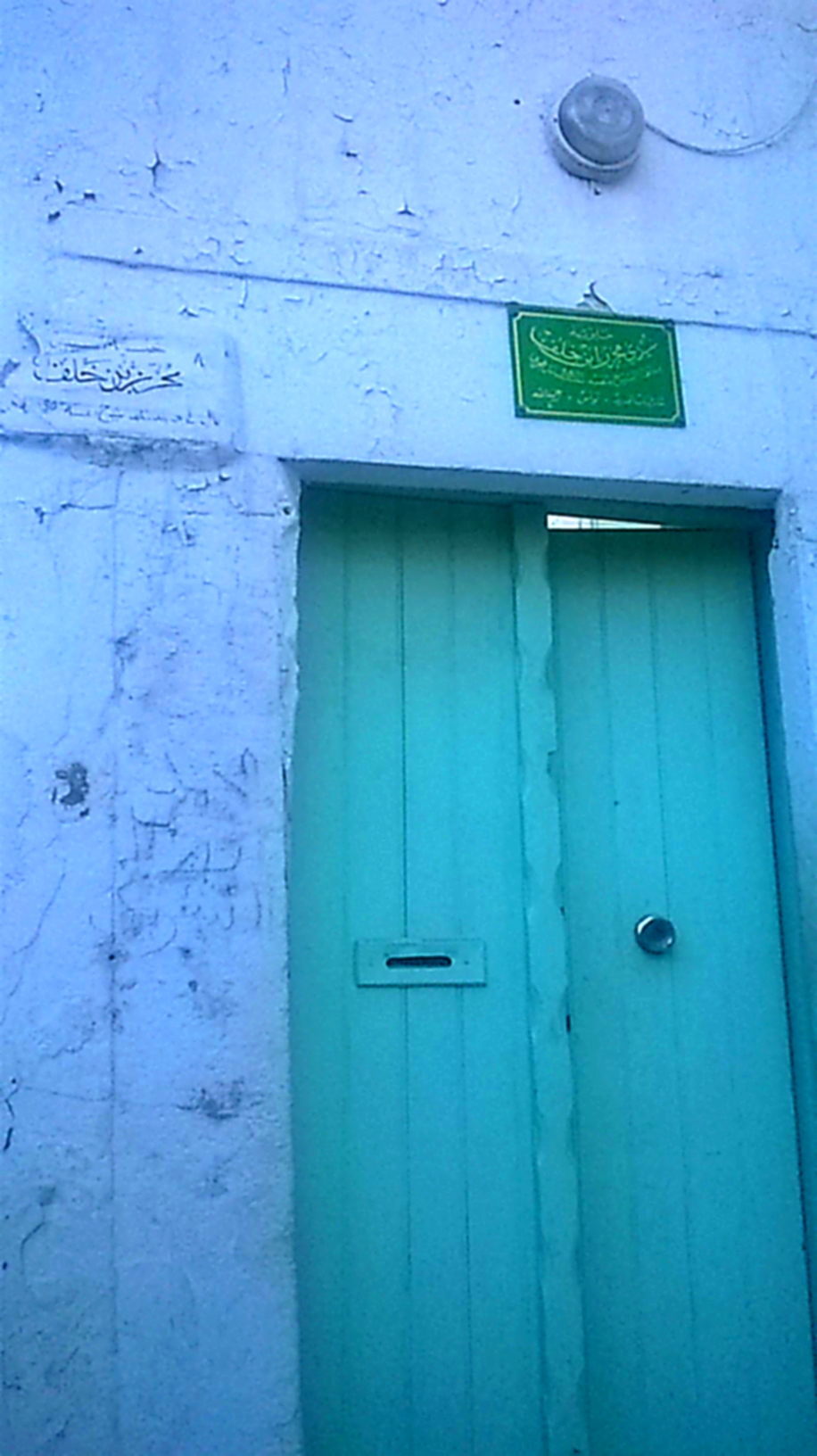
Entrance of the mosque

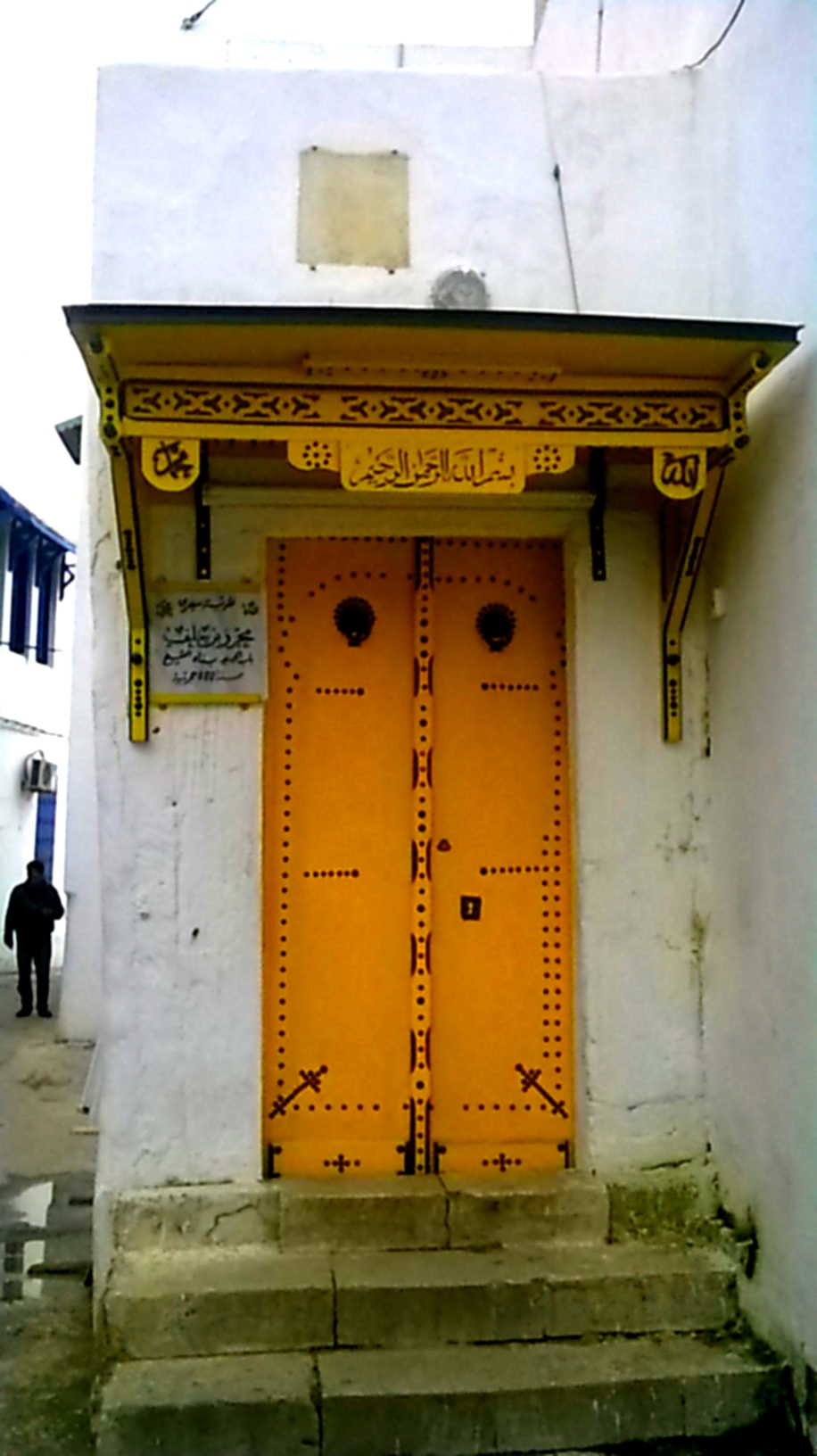
Facade of the mosque after restoration

== See also ==
- Souk El Haddadine (Sfax)
