= Charbati Mosque =

Mosque in Tunis, Tunisia

- جامع الشربات
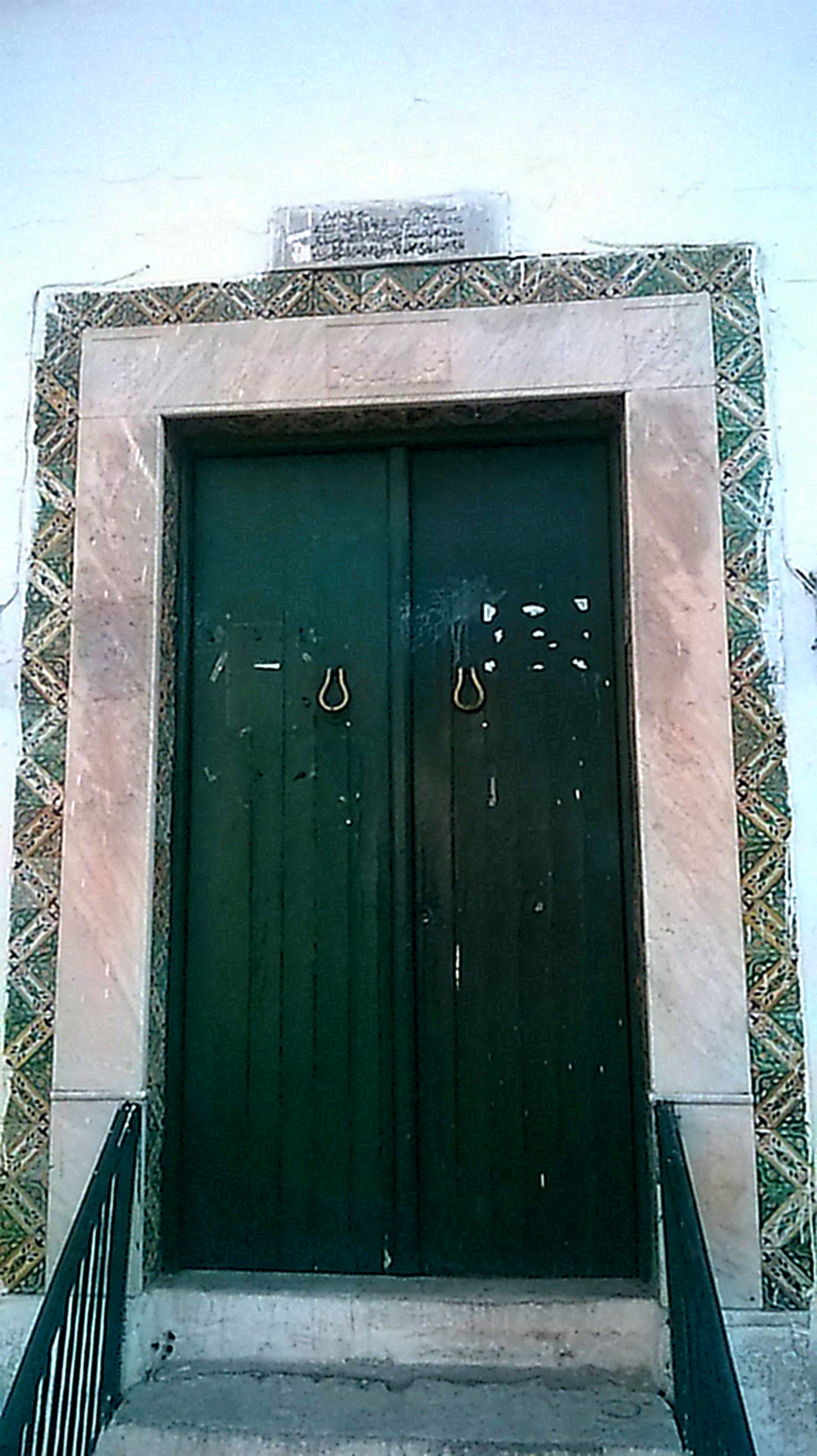

- Location within Tunisia

Religion
- Affiliation: Islam
- Branch/tradition: Sunni

Location
- Location: Tunis, Tunisia
- Interactive map of Charbati Mosque
- Coordinates: 36.791069°N 10.17128°E

Architecture
- Type: Mosque

Charbati Mosque (Arabic: جامع الشربات), is a Tunisian mosque located in the south of the medina of Tunis, in El Hajjamine Hood in the Bab Jazira suburb. It is known for its Sahih al-Bukhari recital every Sunday.

== Localization ==
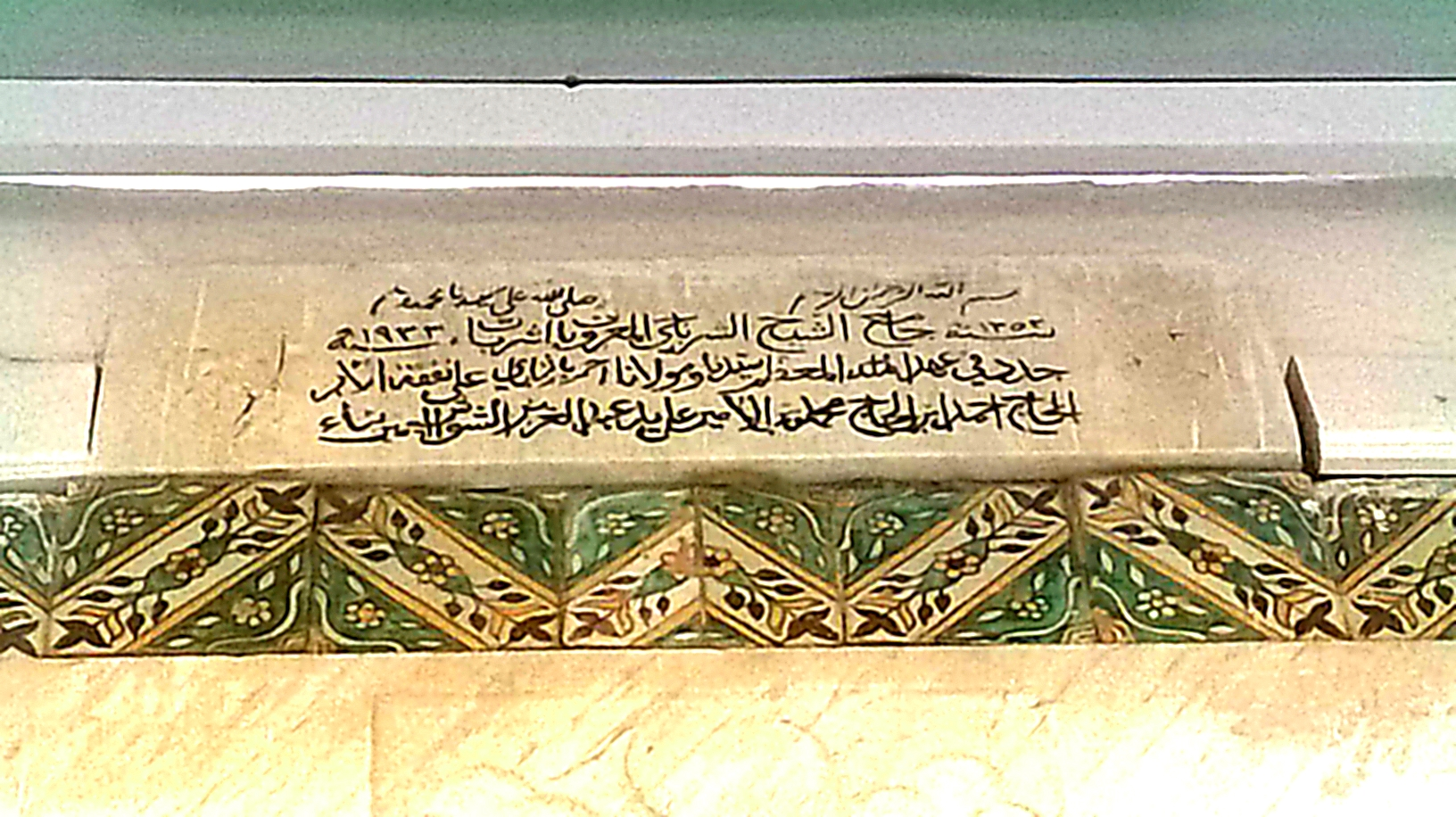
Commemorative plaque of the mosque

The mosque is located in El Hajjamine Street, near Bab Jedid, one of the medina's gates.

== Etymology ==
According to the commemorative plaque, it got its name from its founder cheikh El Charbagi (Arabic: الشيخ الشرباجي).

== History ==
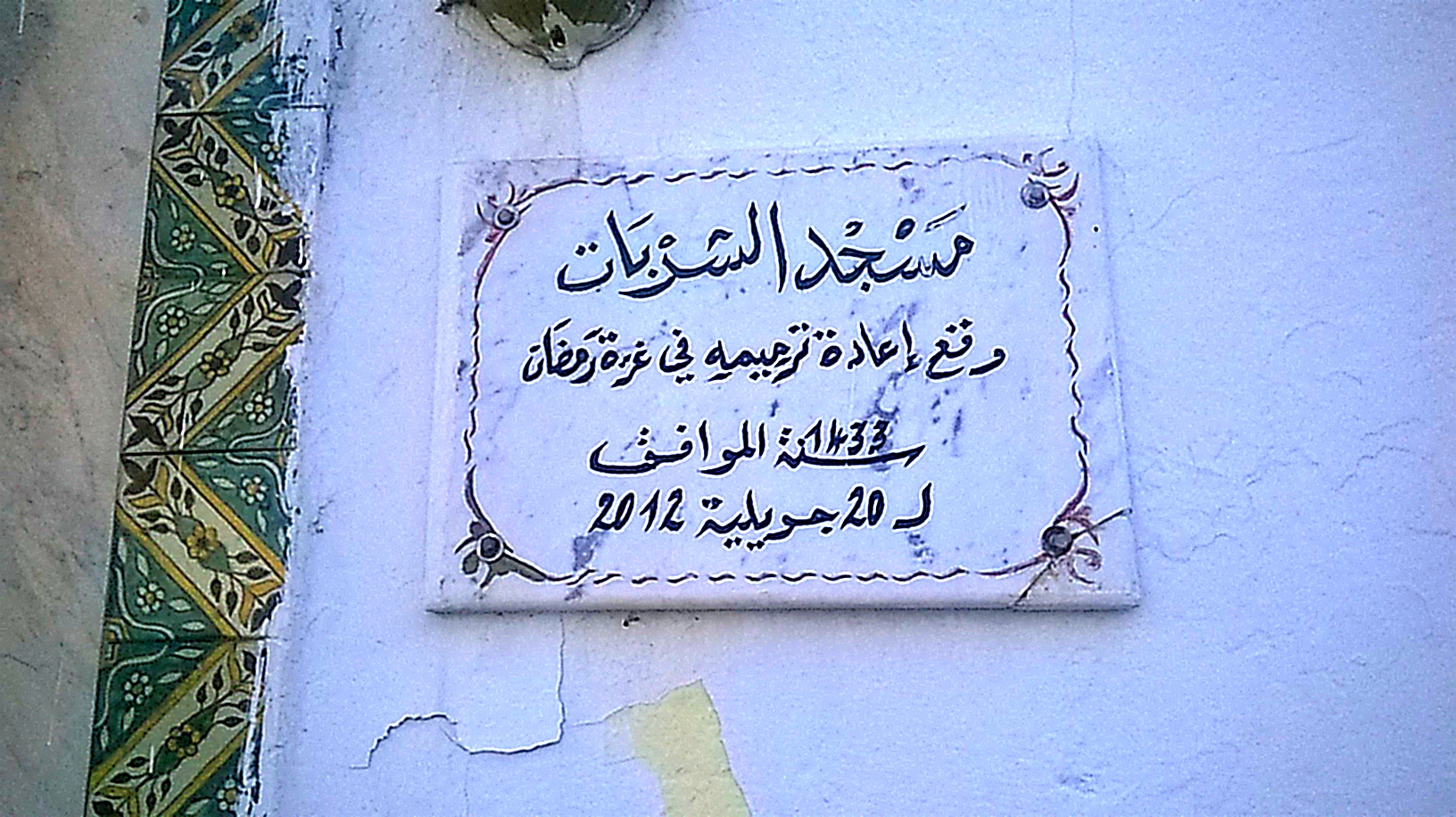
Commemorative plaque of the second restoration

According to the commemorative plaque at the entrance, the mosque was built in 1933 during the Husainid era. Then, it was restored under the orders of Ahmad II of Tunis, one of the beys of Tunis, and thanks to the funds of Ahmed Ben Haj Mohamed (Arabic: الحاج أحمد ابن الحاج محمد). It was restored again in 2012 .
