= Sidi Mahrez Khelloua Mosque =

Mosque in Tunis, Tunisia

- مسجد خلوية سيدي محرز
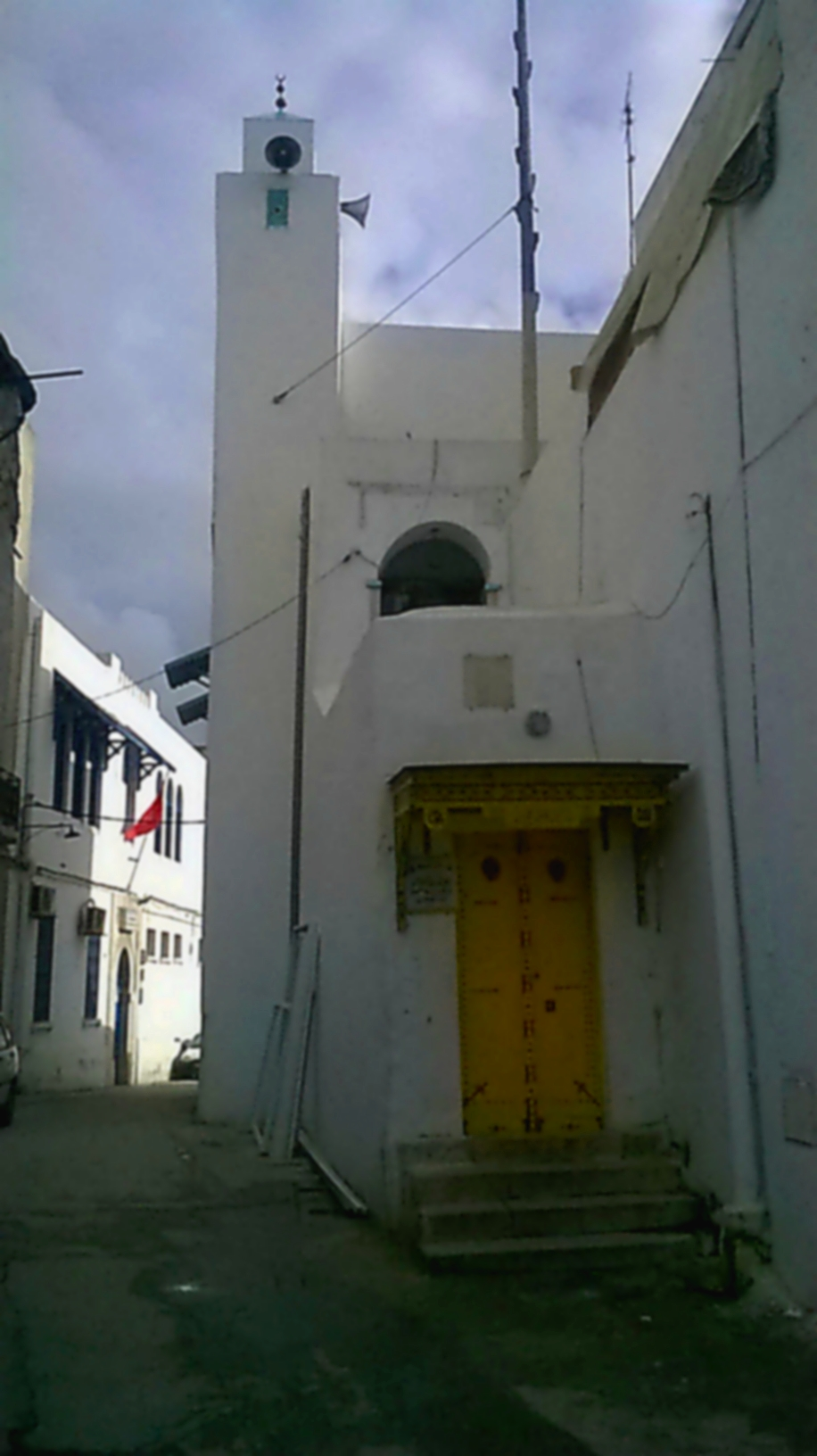

- Location within Tunisia

Location
- Location: Tunis, Tunisia
- Interactive map of Sidi Mahrez Khelloua Mosque
- Coordinates: 36.792406°N 10.171379°E

Architecture
- Type: Mosque

Sidi Mahrez Khelloua Mosque (Arabic: مسجد خلوية سيدي محرز) is a mosque in Tunis, Tunisia.

== Location ==
This mosque is at 13 Sidi Ayed Street, in the Bab Jedid quarter of the city, south of the Medina of Tunis.

== Etymology ==
The mosque is named for its founder Abu Mohamed Mahrez Ibn Khalaf (Arabic: أبو محمد محرز بن خلف) or Sidi Mahrez, who was also known as the "Sultan of the Medina". Khelloua is a Sufi word that refers to a place of isolation where an imam or a cheikh carries out his invocation which can last for days.

== History ==
According to the commemorative plaque, the mosque was built by Sidi Mahrez in the 10th century. Recently it got restored.

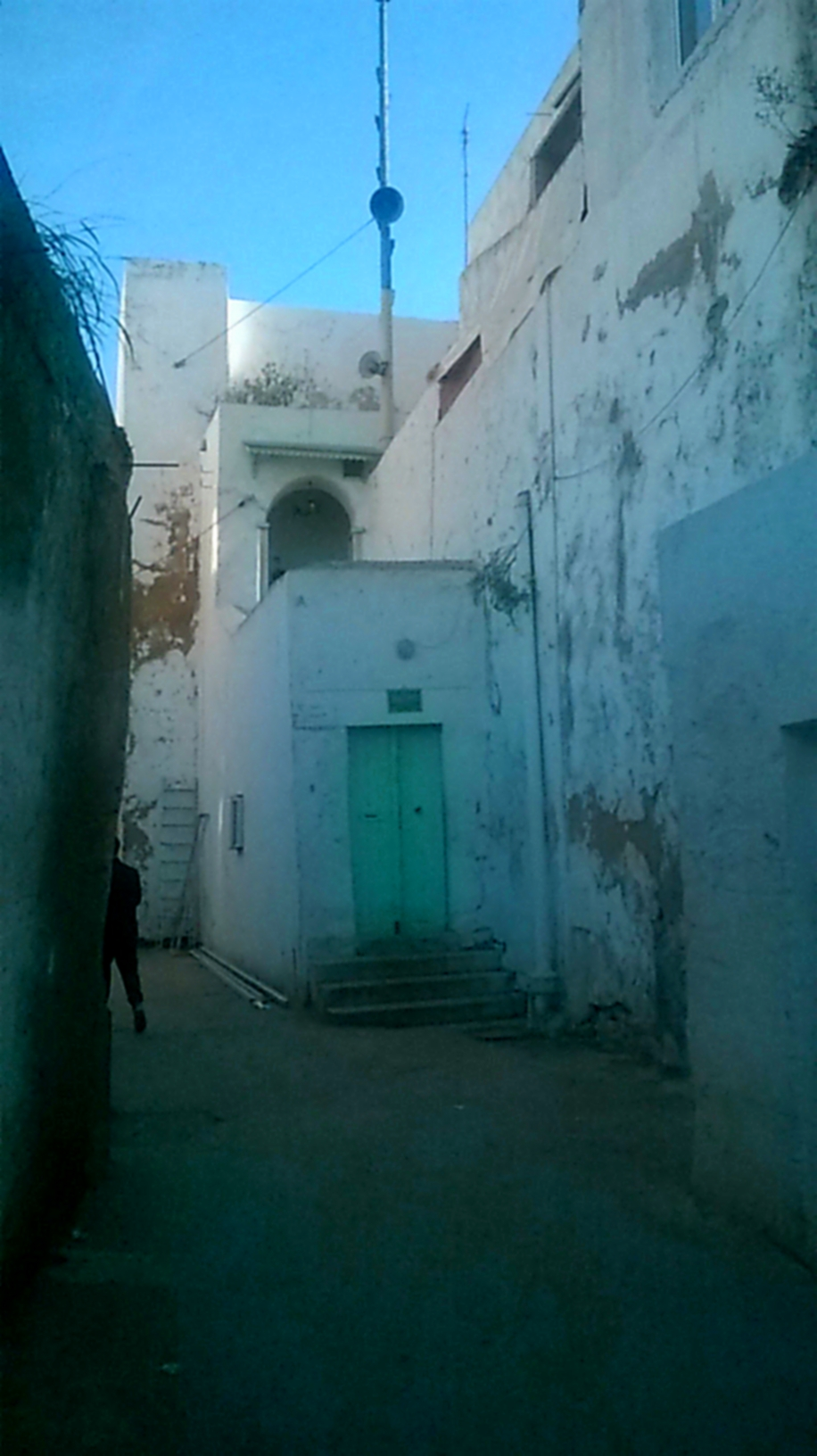
The mosque after the restoration

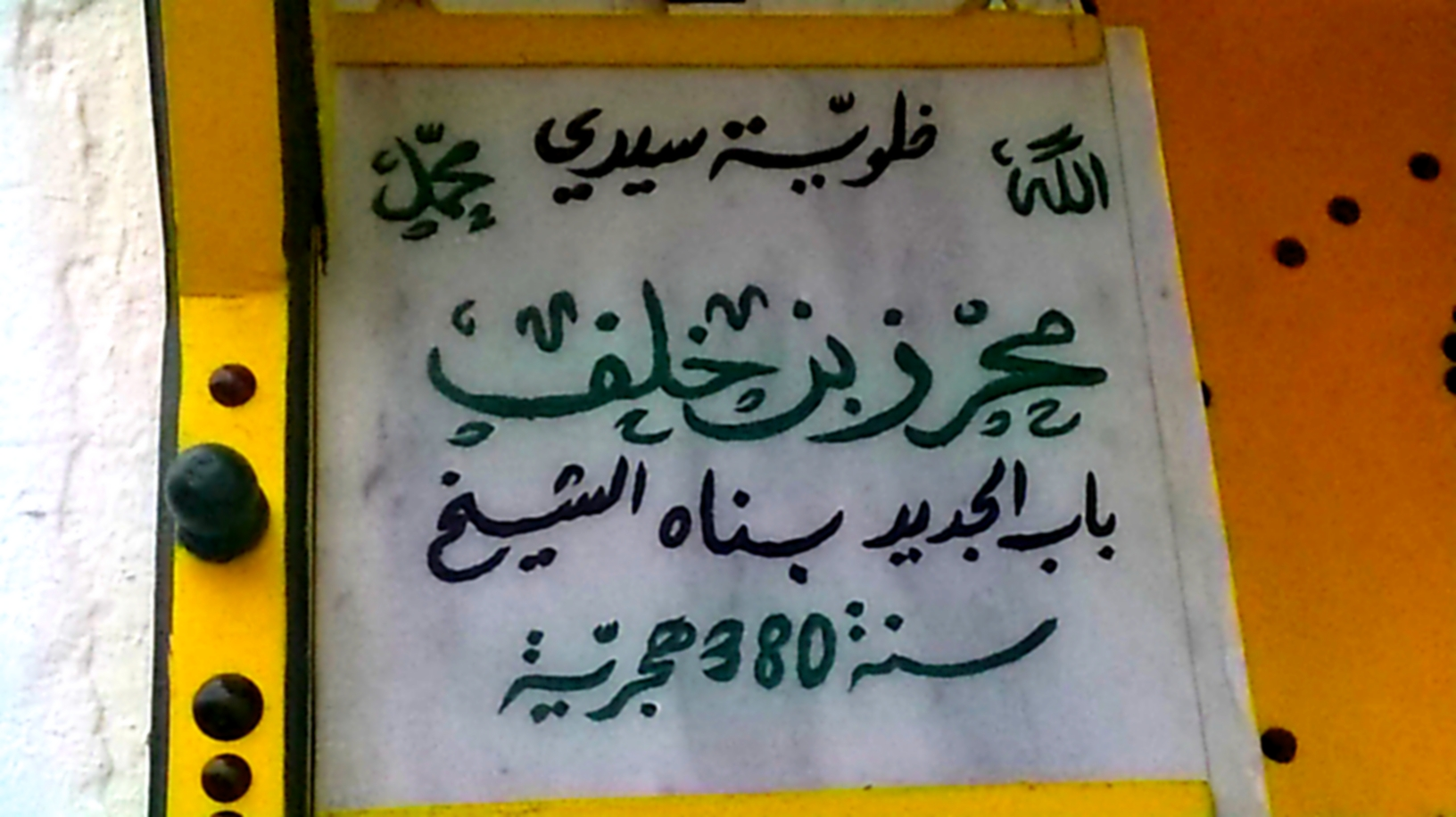
Commemorative plaque of the mosque

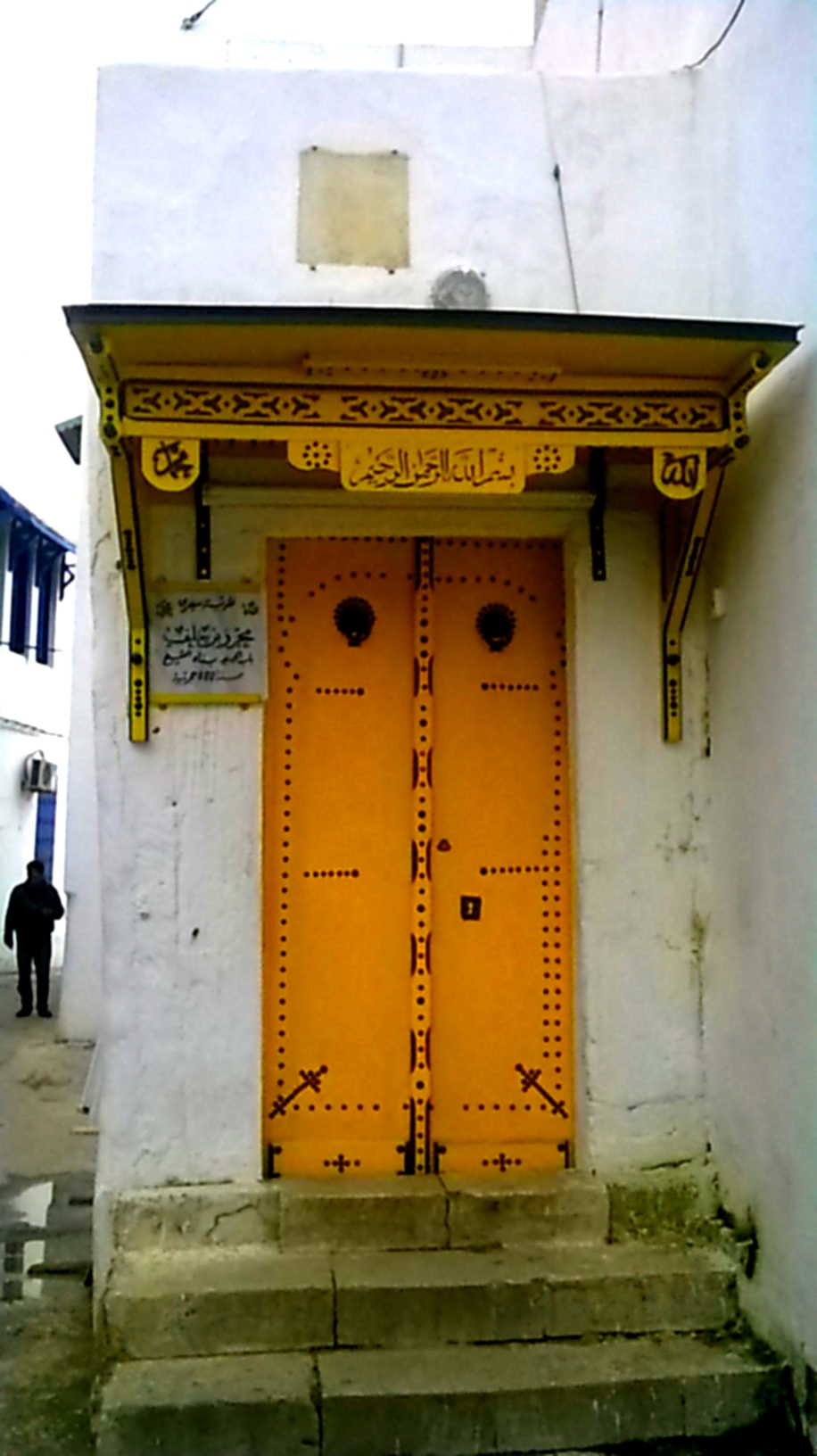
Entrance of the mosque

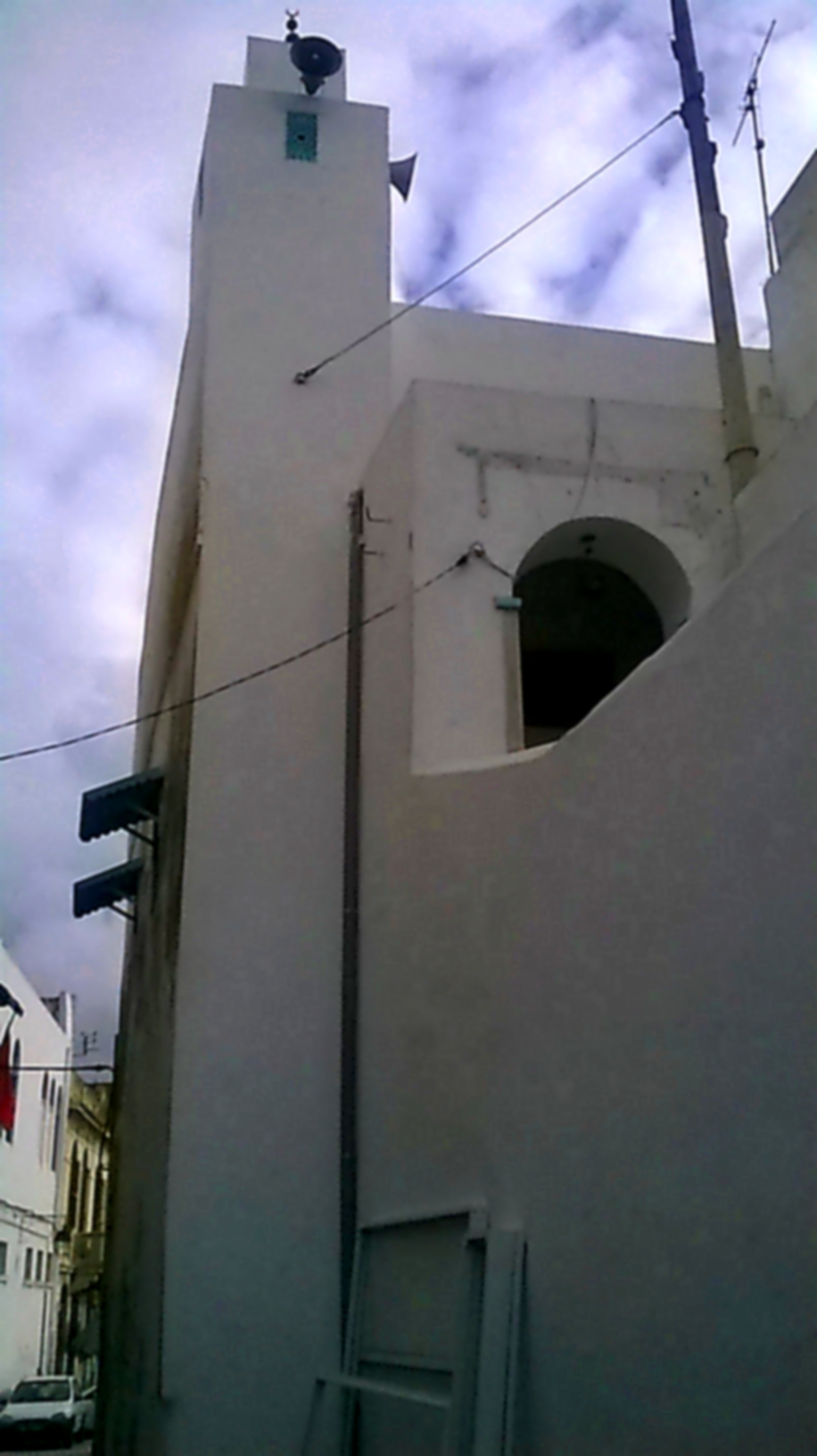
Minaret of the mosque
