= Dar Djellouli =

Palace in Tunis

Dar Djellouli is an old palace of the medina of Tunis. It is located in the Street of the Rich in Bab Jedid, near Tourbet el Bey.

It is indexed as one of the biggest historical residences of Tunis in the inventory of Jacques Revault, member of the Middle East and Mediterranean Studies Research Group.

== History ==
At the end of the 18th century, the rich Mahmoud Djellouli bought a beautiful residence that was a gift from the sovereign Hussein I for his daughter, Princess Lalla Fatma, wife of the prime minister Rejeb Khaznadar.

At the beginning of the 19th century, after modifications and extensions were added, the residence became a magnificent palace, that gave to the street where it is located the name of the "Street of the Rich", because, at that time, the Djellouli family's wealth was very important.

Extensions of the palace continued even after Mahmoud Djellouli's death with his two sons, the qaids Farhat and Hussein.

== Architecture ==
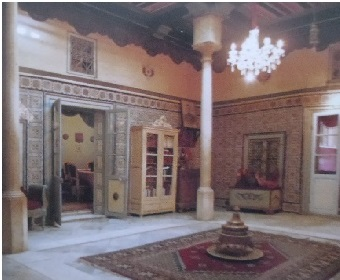
Courtyard of the hosts' floor

The palace's decoration is a mixture of the traditional local style and the Western one. This association can be noticed in the columns with Turkish capitals, Italian and Qallaline faience, and Hispano-Maghrebi ceilings.

In Dar Djellouli you can find all parts of a typical Tunisian residence of that time: a driba, a skifa or corridor, a spacious courtyard surrounded by big suites with alcoves at the ground floor, and common parts at the first floor (like the kitchen, the hammam, service rooms, etc.) with two small halls, a floor for hosts or sraya and a resting room (kushk) for the house master on the top of the balcony.
