= Mahmoud Djellouli =

Tunisian Diplomat

Mahmoud Djellouli (1755–1839) was a trader and Tunisian diplomat. He was a member of the same clan as Youssef Saheb Ettabaa and among the important figures of his time.

The life of Djellouli illustrates the role played by the Mediterranean Sea in developing the financial and political power of Tunisian beys under the Ottoman Empire. He was a trader and also collected levies on the corsairs who became known as the Barbary pirates. He wielded great influence over Tunisian socioeconomic and political developments between the end of the 18th century and the beginning of the 19th century.

== Family life ==
Mahmoud Djellouli was born into the Makhzen family, which dated back to the Hafsid dynasty, according to historian Ahmad ibn Abi Diyaf. They were Sfax notables of Arab origin, merchants and shipowners at the end of the 16th century, and became farmers and qaids in the 17th century, then moved to the Capital Tunis after buying an important house of Rajeb Khaznadar and his spouse Fatma Bey Dar Djellouli in 1796.

== Business ==
Mahmoud Djellouli began his career by taking over his father's business and administrative responsibilities: he succeeded his father Baccar, who died in 1782, as qaid of Sfax and later also added responsibility for Sousse and for the Sahel. He relied on trade to acquire key positions. His business is linked to exported farm products to Europe and the Levant: leathers, olive oil, grain, wool and so on. His agricultural estates supplied his business above all and participated also in the collective fiscal surplus.

Rivalries between France and Britain at the end of the 18th century offered him the opportunity to participate in arming the corsairs. He was among the four forces in the arms market at the time, along with the beys, the Ben Ayed family and Saheb Ettabaâ.

In 1804, he gained control of the custom houses of the regency. Between 1808 and 1810 he invested 600,000 piastres for his sons Mohammed, Farhat, Hassan and Hussein in this enterprise. In 1805 he became the qumrugi or head of customs. He had a monopoly on the principal exports and also held the seal that had to be applied to permits or teskérès.

On October 27, 1795, he formed a company with Ahmed Sallami and Ahmed El Kharrat and invested 38,505 piastres. At that point he was the richest man in the country, and the bey made him his minister of Finance. In 1807, as ministre et councillor for the sovereign, Hammouda Pacha, he loaned the money to arm the regency and tried to convince the nobility to join the war against the Ottomans of Algiers, which the regency eventually won.

The bey named him the regency's ambassador, envoy and a commercial and political representative to Malta between 1810 and 1813. During this period he provided political, military and especially commercial intelligence to Tunisian authorities, allowing the bey to keep track of arm sales and of the efforts of the dey of Algiers to recruit Anatolian janissaries.

In 1814-1815, with the disappearance of his protectors Hammouda Pacha and Youssef Saheb Ettabaâ, he left government administration to devote himself to business. This did not make him any less influential, and his sons all had business and administrative careers as well.

The writer Prince Hermann, Fürst von Pückler-Muskau visited his son Farhat, then the qaid of Sfax, in 1836. He later wrote that the qaid was the son of the "rich Djellouli of Tunis", whose fortune was estimated to be three million piasters and therefore was an important man. William Jowett and Joseph Greaves also mentioned Djellouli's wealth and influence in an of the latter's visit to the regency of Tunis in 1826. A street in the medina quarter of Tunis where he bought a palace in 1794, was renamed Street of the Rich Man in his honor.

== See also ==
- Dar al-Mal
