= Dar Bayram =

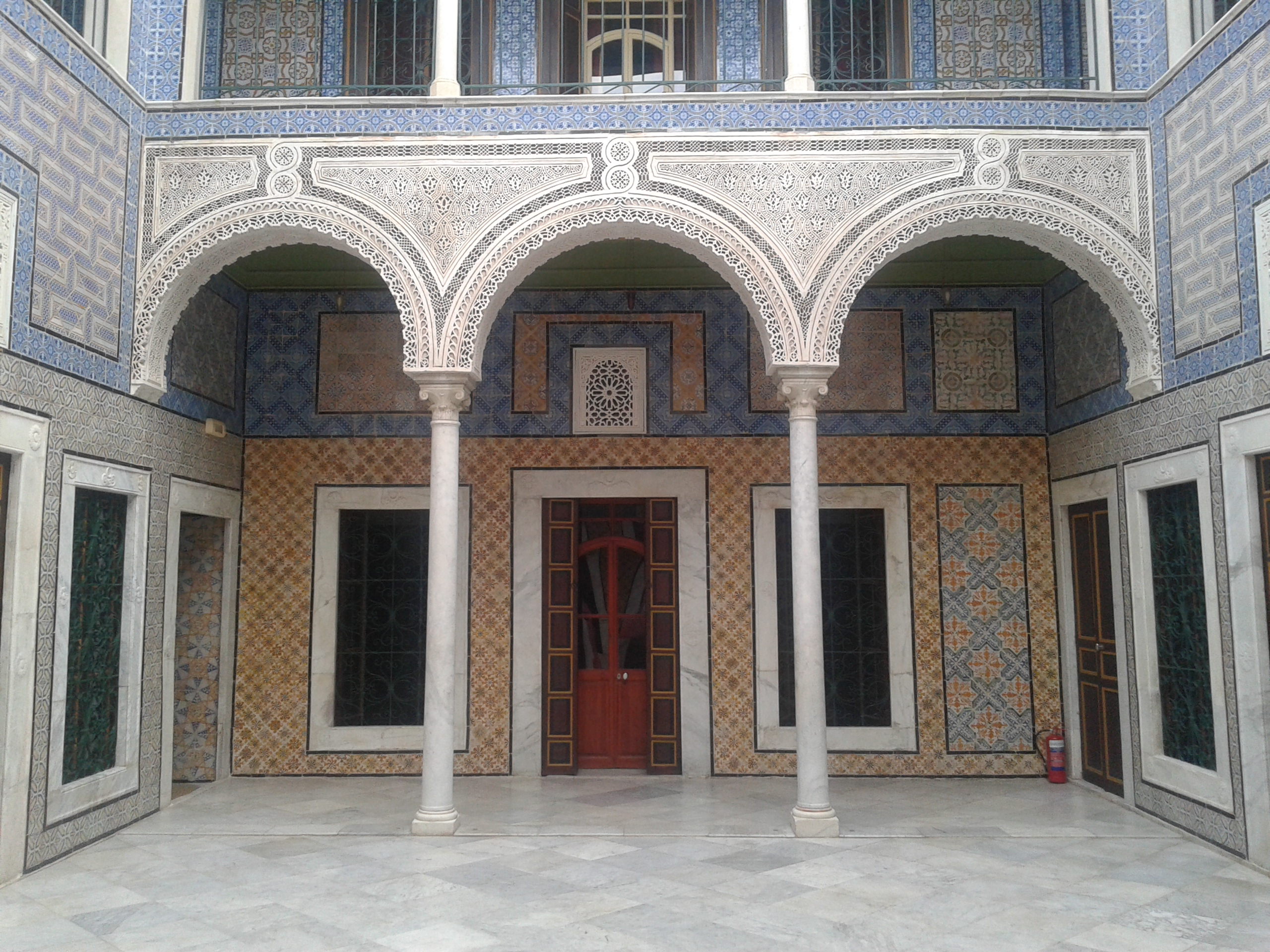
Hall of dar Bayram

Dar Bayram is an old palace located in the Andalusians Street, in the medina of Tunis. It is indexed as one of the biggest historical residences of Tunis, in the inventory of Jacques Revault, member of the Middle East and Mediterranean Studies Research Group.

== History ==
Sheikh Al Islam Mhamed Bayram bought the palace from the Daoud family, rich notaries and merchants, and in 1883 started important modifications by adding another floor. He died before extensions were completed in 1900, and his sons lived in the building.

On 31 January 2015, the palace was converted into a hotel.

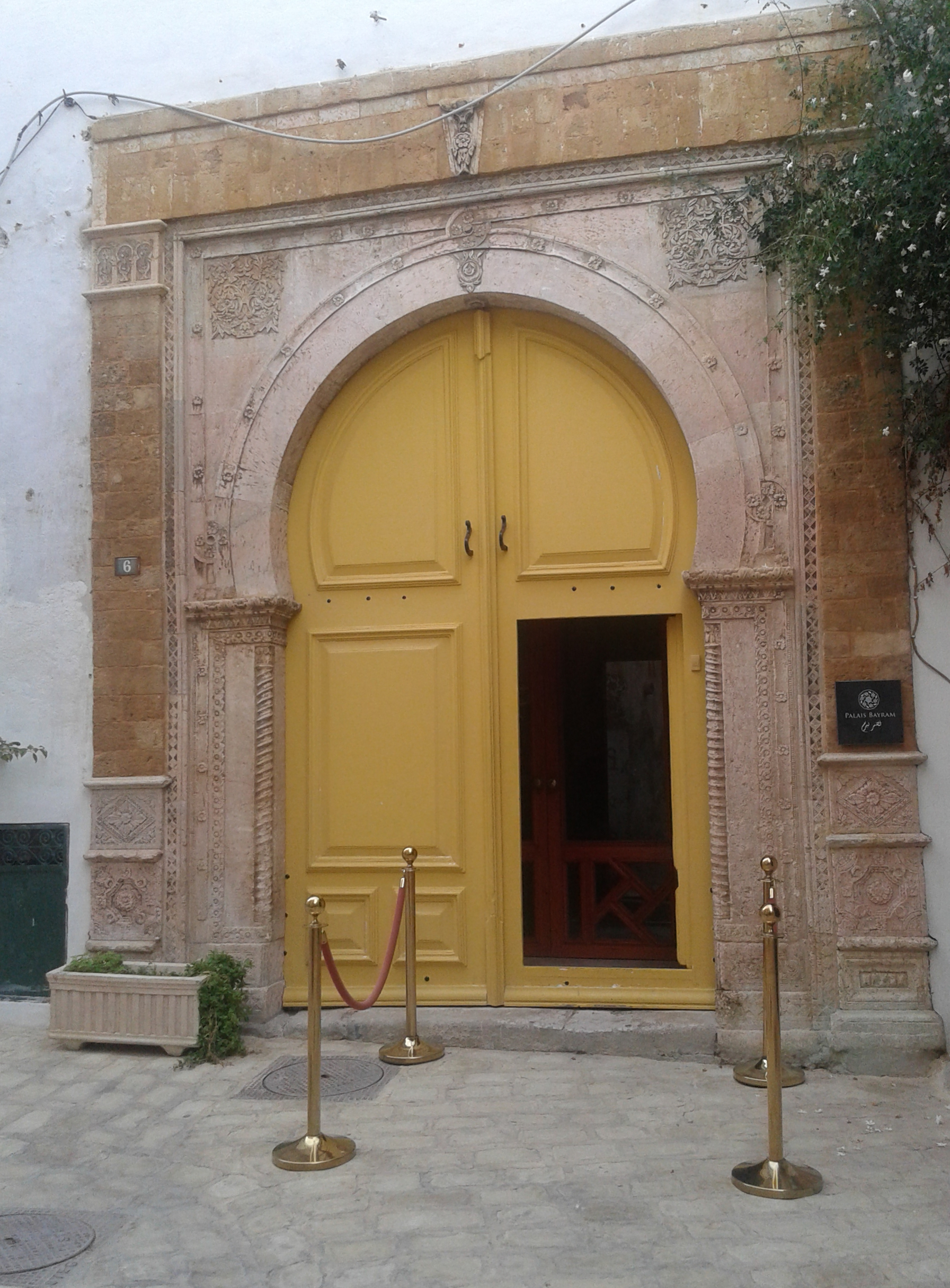
Main entrance of Dar Bayram

== Architecture ==
The palace has a driba and a skifa, which are successively a big and a small vestibule. Like all other residences in the medina of Tunis, it has a big court surrounded by apartments, with two other smaller courts for the kitchen and servants accommodation.

All the decoration added by Bayram is essentially Italian: clear marble ground, walls with Italian faience and a wrought iron grill.
