= Bab Jedid (Tunis) =

- Arabic: باب الجديد
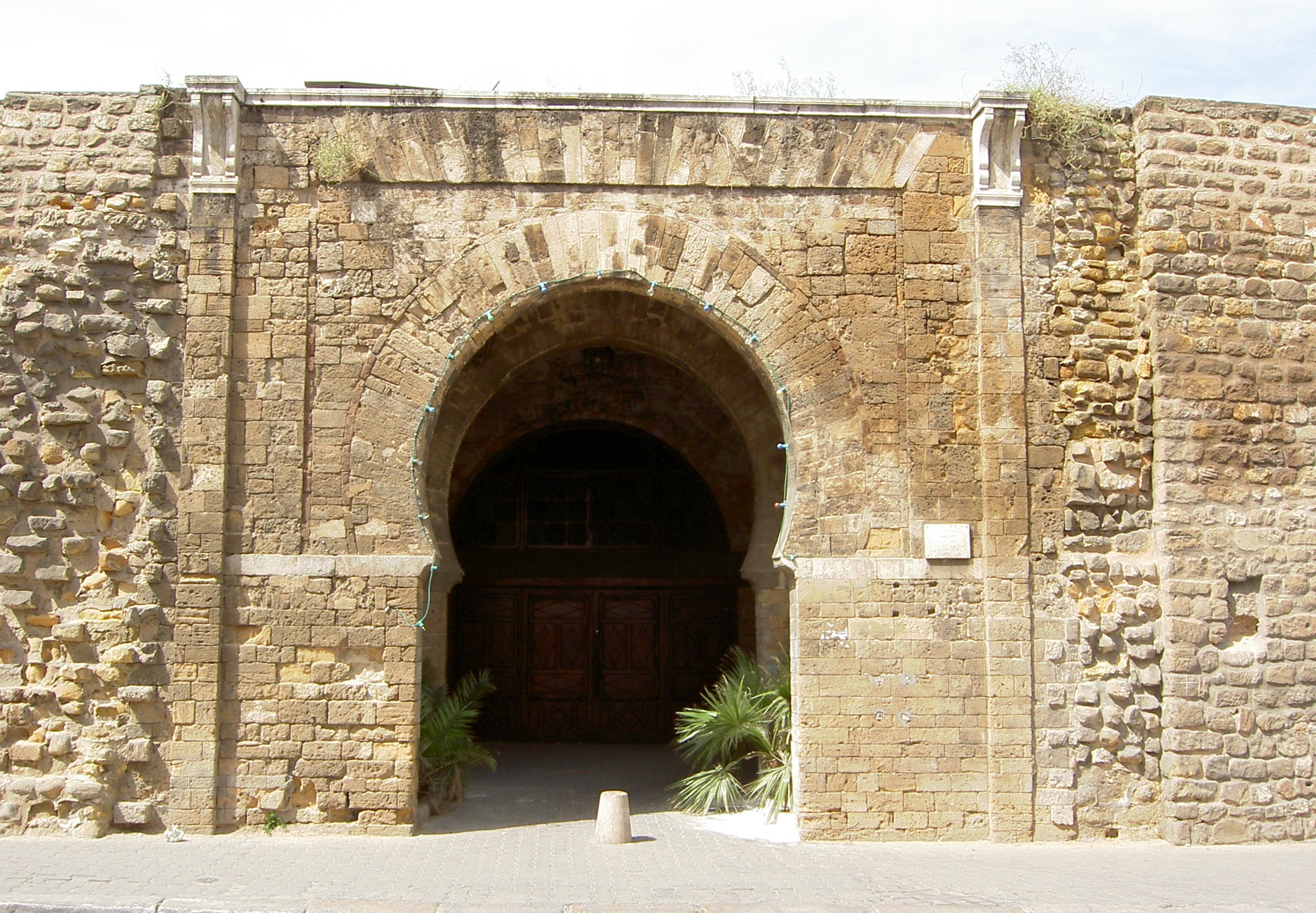
- View of Bab Jedid in 2008
- Interactive map of the Bab Jedid area
- Etymology: "New Gate", built in the early Hafsid dynasty

General information
- Location: Tunis, Tunisia
- Coordinates: 36.7919°N 10.1704°E
- Completed: 13th century

Bab Jedid (Arabic: باب الجديد), also spelled Bab Djedid or Bab Jdid, is one of the gates of the medina of Tunis. Its name translates to "New Gate" in English, as it was one of the first gates built under the rule of the Hafsid dynasty. It is also called the "Gate of the Blacksmiths", due to the nearby souk for blacksmiths.

The neighboring district houses many buildings (palaces, large houses and houses), boutiques housing a wide variety of trades, zawiyas and madrasas. Among the bourgeois and aristocratic mansions are Dar El Béji, Dar Djellouli, Dar Zarrouk and Dar Bayram. It is also known to house the headquarters of the Club Africain.
