= Corsairs of Algiers =

1516–1830 unit of the Algerine army

- The Tai'fa of Raïs
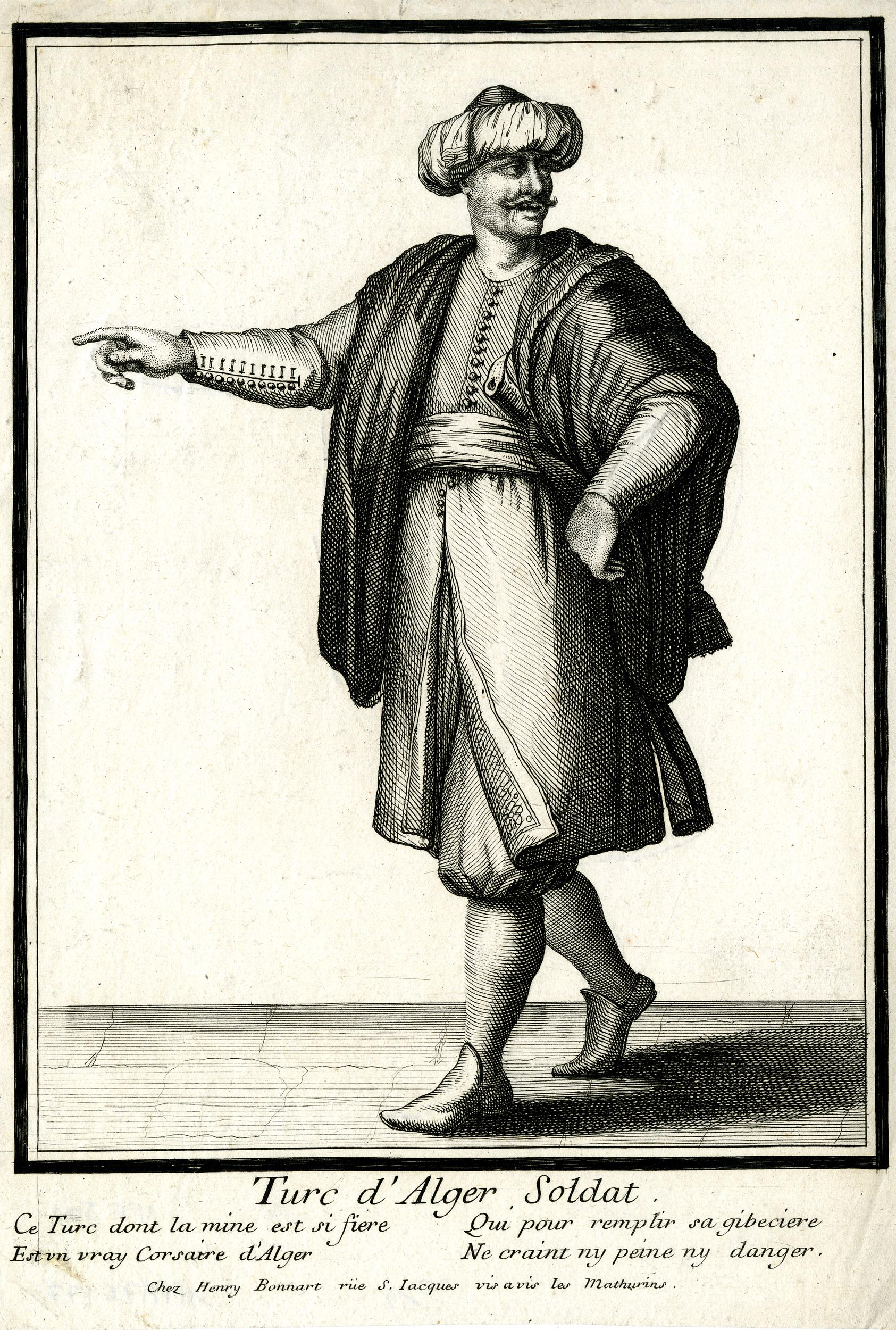
- A Corsair of Algiers
- Active: 1516–1830
- Disbanded: De jure 1830
- Country: Regency of Algiers (part of the Ottoman Empire)
- Allegiance: Wakil al-Kharadj, or minister of the navy of Algiers and foreign affairs, Kapudan-reïs, "admiral, hierarchical chief of all the reïs"
- Main location: Algiers
- Equipment: Yatagan, Nimcha, Kabyle musket, and other locally made weapons
- Engagements: Algiers expedition (1541); Battle of Lepanto (1571); Odjak of Algiers Revolution; Anglo-Algerian War; French-Algerian War 1681–88; Invasion of Algiers (1775); American–Algerian War (1785–1795); Battle off Cape Gata (1815); Bombardment of Algiers (1816); Invasion of Algiers in 1830

Commanders
- Notable commanders: Oruç Reis; Hayreddin Barbarossa; Occhiali; Jan Janszoon; Ali Bitchin; Mezzo Morto Hüseyin Pasha; Raïs Hamidou

The ta'ifa of raïs (Arabic: طائفة الرياس, community of corsair captains) or the Raïs for short, were Barbary pirates based in Regency of Algiers who were involved in piracy and the slave trade in the Mediterranean Sea from the 16th to the 19th century. They were an ethnically mixed group of seafarers, including mostly "renegades" from European provinces of the Mediterranean and the North Sea, along with local Algerians and Turks, denoting various muslims from the Ottoman Empire irrespective of their ethnicity. Such crews were experienced in naval combat, making Algiers a formidable pirate base. Its activity was directed against the Spanish empire, but it did not neglect the coasts of Sicily, Sardinia, Naples or Provence. It was the taifa which, through its seizures, maintained the prosperity of Algiers and its finances.

The corsair taifa of Algiers reached the zenith of its power in the first half of the seventeenth century as a nominally autonomous Ottoman military elite. Up until 1626, the Algerian corsair admiral (Kapudan-rais) was invested by the Ottoman sultan and subordinate to the Kapudan Pasha of the Ottoman empire. Often former Christian slaves were promoted up the ta'ifa chain of command, the admirals and their corsairs were a powerful military and political force in the regency of Algiers, and could even challenge the authority of the Pasha and the Odjak Janissary corps.

== Pirates or Privateers ? ==
=== State institution ===
The establishment of the Regency of Algiers by the Barbarossa brothers gave the Muslim corso a solid territorial base, which was organized in its beginnings for self-defence as well as holy war; described as al-jihad fi'l-bahr (holy war at sea) against the Spanish Empire and the Christian Knights who continued the work of the crusades. In the days of Hayreddin Barbarossa and his immediate successors, the raïs were an integral part of the Ottoman navy, but by the 17th century they had become a distinct group. Unlike in Ottoman Tunisia, where privateers were allowed to equip their own pirate ships, piracy in Ottoman Algeria was a monopoly of the state. The Kapudan-raïs (admiral, hierarchical chief of all the reïs), or captain of vessels, was often, after the Pasha, the most important person in the Diwan of Algiers. Thus, the corso became a permanent institution in the Regency of Algiers, and its main income was included in the state budget. Enriching those who cared for it and returning to the treasury one-fifth of its takings, the corso effectively created the state of Algiers, and was essential to its existence, which all the efforts of the government tended to develop. It was also the activity upon which the economical and political prosperity of the Odjak as well as its religious prestige to a great extent depended.

=== Legal status ===
European authors continued to view the Ottoman regencies as 'dens of pirates' and their actions as "African banditry", but France, the Dutch Republic and England all concluded peace treaties with the North African regencies in the 17th century. These treaties prompted legal theorists in Europe to change their views about the general status of the regencies. Hugo Grotius implicitly admitted that Algiers exercised the Jus ad bellum of a sovereign power through its corsairs. The treaties were also influential in the development of the law of the sea and the Law of Nations.

Irish lawyer Charles Molloy wrote in 1682 regarding those shifts in dealing with: "Pirates that have reduced themselves into a Government of State, as those of Algier, Sally, Tripoli, Tunis, and the like" and should not "obtain the rights of solemnities of war." He added:

Tunis and Tripoli and their Sister Algier do at this day (though Nests of Pirates) obtain the right of Legation' demonstrated by the treaties concluded by Britain with Tunis and Tripoli. This makes them not Pirates (enemies of mankind) but gives them the status of enemies (in war): So that now (though indeed Pirates) yet having acquired the reputation of a Government, they cannot properly be esteemed Pirates but Enemies.

In 1737, Dutch jurist and legal theorist Cornelius van Bynkershoek wrote:

The peoples of Algiers, Tripoli, Tunis, and Salee are not pirates, but rather organized states, which have a fixed territory in which there is an established government, and with which, as with other nations, we [i.e. the Staten-General] are now at peace, now at war. Hence they seem to be entitled to the rights of independent states.

Thus, the corso acquired both religious and legitimate dimensions, which in turn gave it an international dimension that negated the faithless and lawless nature of piracy upon Algerian and other barbary corsairs.

French historian Dianel Panzac, although admitting that the Barbary corsairs hardly differed in their methods from pirates that were still distinguishable by their "black flag, uncertain nationality, the vandalising of the ship, and especially the killing of the crew in order to leave no trace", nevertheless respected the administrative and diplomatic frameworks that North African regencies were bounded with, which is why the Barbary warships were classified as privateering vessels and not pirate ships.

== Corsair state of Algiers ==
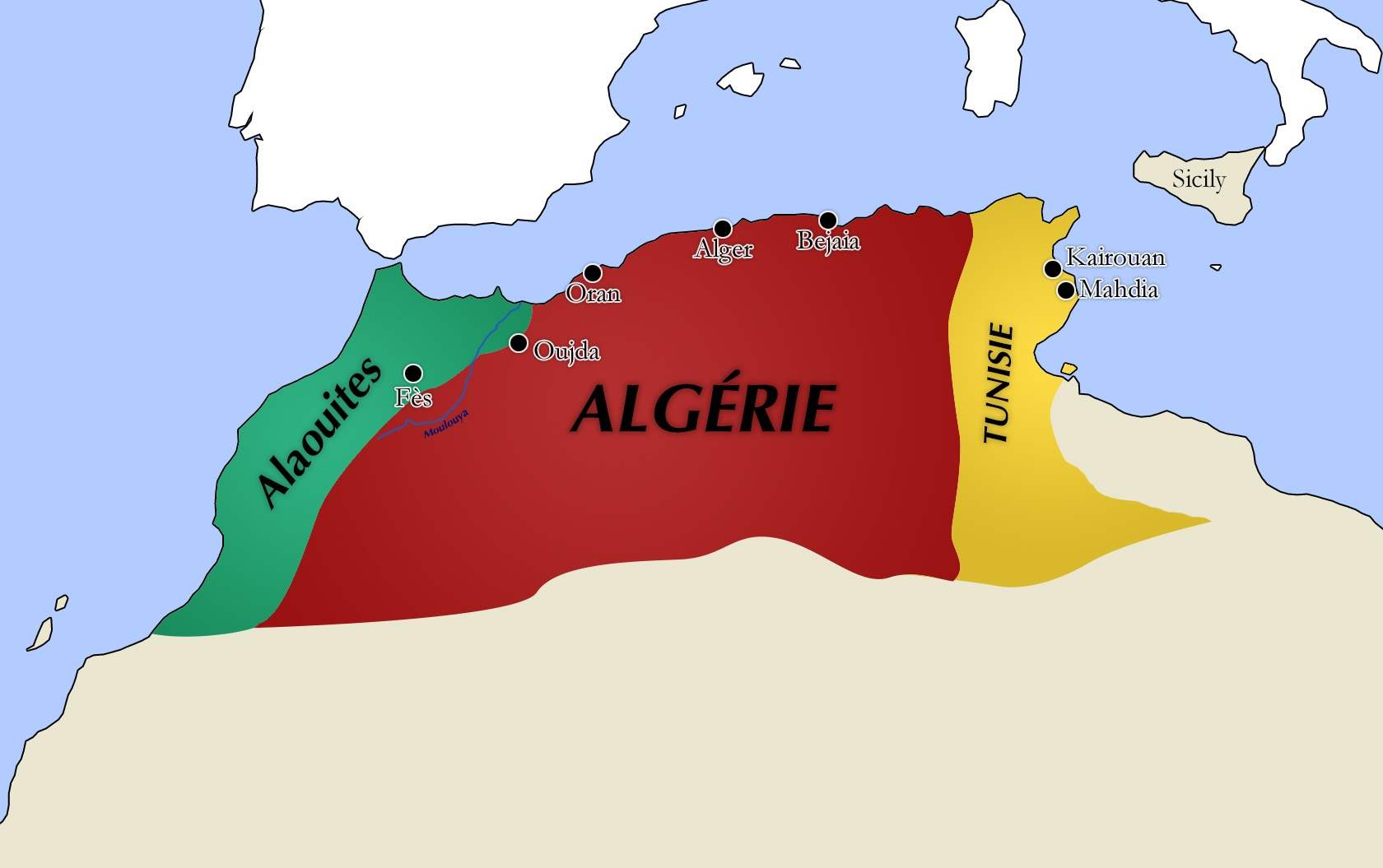
Extent of the Regency of Algiers in late 18th-/early 19th-century according to multiple primary sources

=== General characteristics ===
The Ottoman sultan issued a firman (royal decree) appointing a ruler to govern Algiers. This governor might hold the rank of beylerbey, then pasha, and his initial appointment was usually for three years, after which it could be extended or cancelled. The sultan expected obedience from the ruler, particularly in matters of foreign policy; an annual financial tribute to Istanbul; and ships and men for his fleets when they were demanded. Otherwise the ruler was given a free hand to govern as he saw fit. In practice, the rais and the Odjak acted autonomously and the pasha gradually lost his power. After the Odjak revolution in 1659, the ruler was elected and the sultan only confirmed this election as a sign of its legitimacy, without however having any effective rule over Algiers.

The Regency government became a naval power, and turned its main activities towards the sea. From the 16th century on, the growing volume of international trade, the succession of political crises leading to armed conflicts, the territorial appetites of certain states and the tendencies towards hegemony in the Mediterranean made the constitution and maintenance of an active navy essential, capable of defending a determined policy, which could be comprised as maintaining the following:

- Defense of the territory, particularly the coastline,
- Support for the Muslims of Spain attacked by the religious fanaticism of their conquerors,
- Presence alongside the Ottoman Sultan in face of his adversaries,
- Control of the navigation to know friends from enemies,
- Leading the corso war against Europe.

=== Chain of command ===
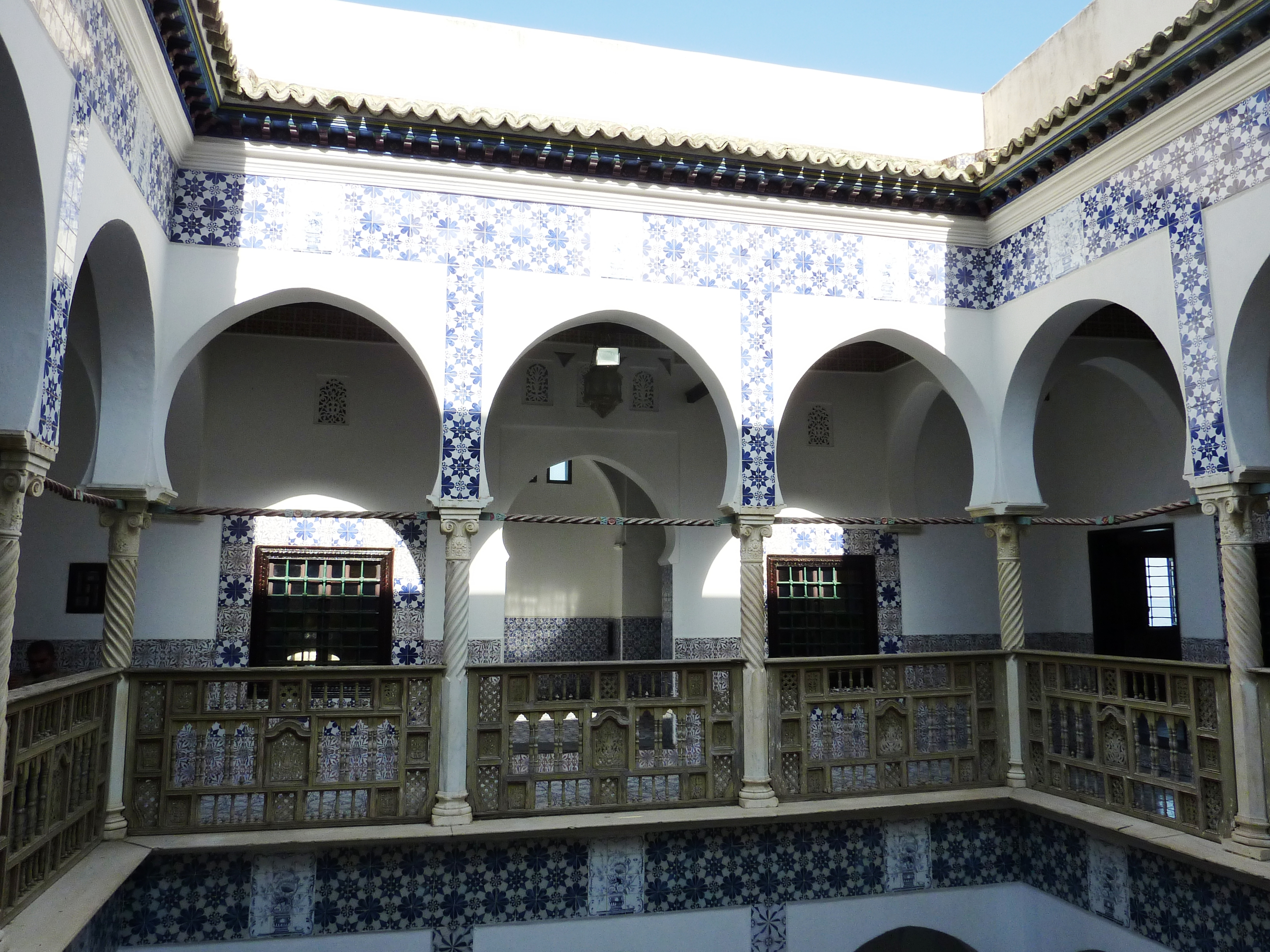
Inside the Palais des Rais (Palace of the Corsair captains) in Algiers

The ruler would be guided by a Divan - a council of government - while another council known as a tai'fa was charged with naval or privateering matters. The tai'fa consisted of the port's senior privateering captains, led by the regency's Kapudan Rais or local admiral (also known as the rais al bahriyya or Captain of the Marine). Direct access to the pasha gave the privateering captains considerable influence in the regency. The ruler was also advised by an Agha, or commander-in- chief of the Algerian Janissary Odjak, whose duties included the annual collection of taxes and ensuring the security of the regency. The Agha also controlled the administration of the city of Algiers and its surroundings (known as Dar-Es-sultan), and presided over deliberations of the Divan. Meanwhile, the Kapudan Rais supervised foreign affairs, and also administered the port of Algiers. Other lesser officials oversaw various aspects of the regency's administration, including the operation of the slave-markets, trade within the regency and the policing of the city. As the regency's legal framework was based on the sharia, the pasha was advised by two muftis, and justice was usually swift and severe. In theory the same draconian system applied to the regency's ships and privateers when they were at sea; but in practice, the Kapudan Rais, the tai'fa, and individual captains were largely left to govern their own affairs.

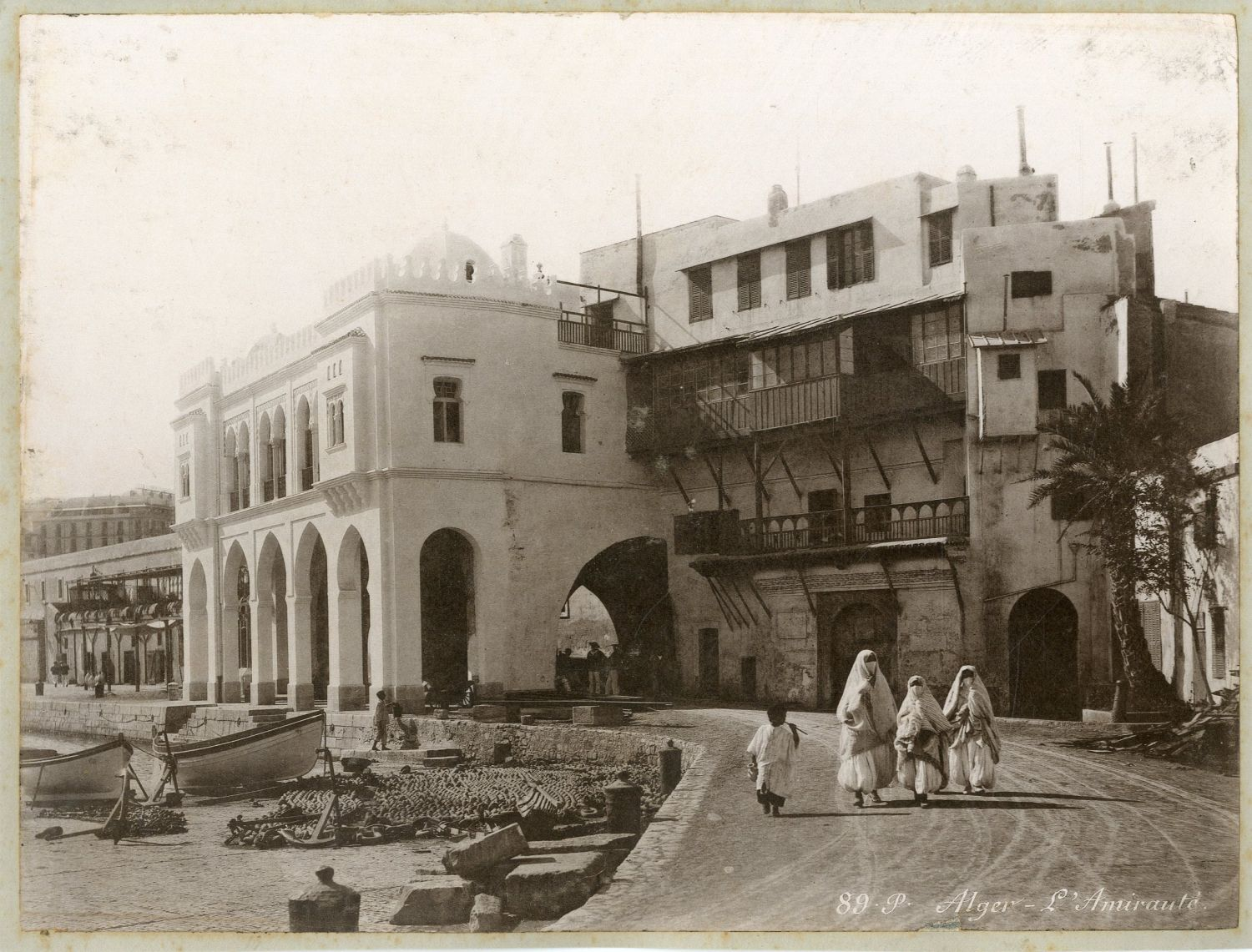
Admiralty of Algiers in 1880, seat of Captain Raïs, harbor master and Wakil al-kharadj (minister of the navy)

While the original holders of the title of Kapudan Rais were usually Turks or leading local privateers, by the 17th century the post was frequently held by a European renegade. The Kapudan Rais had a headquarters building near the harbour, and from there he and a small staff of clerks supervised the movement of all merchant shipping, as well as the activities of privateers and any regency warships. Before a privateering captain could put to sea he had to obtain permission to sail from the Kapudan Rais, and collect a renewed letter of marque from the ' tai'fa. This council established cruising areas in advance, and often the duration of cruises. If the vessel was a galley] or galiot, however, the lack of space for water, provisions, captives or plunder meant that cruises were of fairly short duration. Once these permissions were granted the captain hoisted a green flag to indicate that he was about to sail on a corso, and his crew would embark, accompanied in many cases by a detachment of the regency's Janissaries.

== Christian renegade corsairs ==
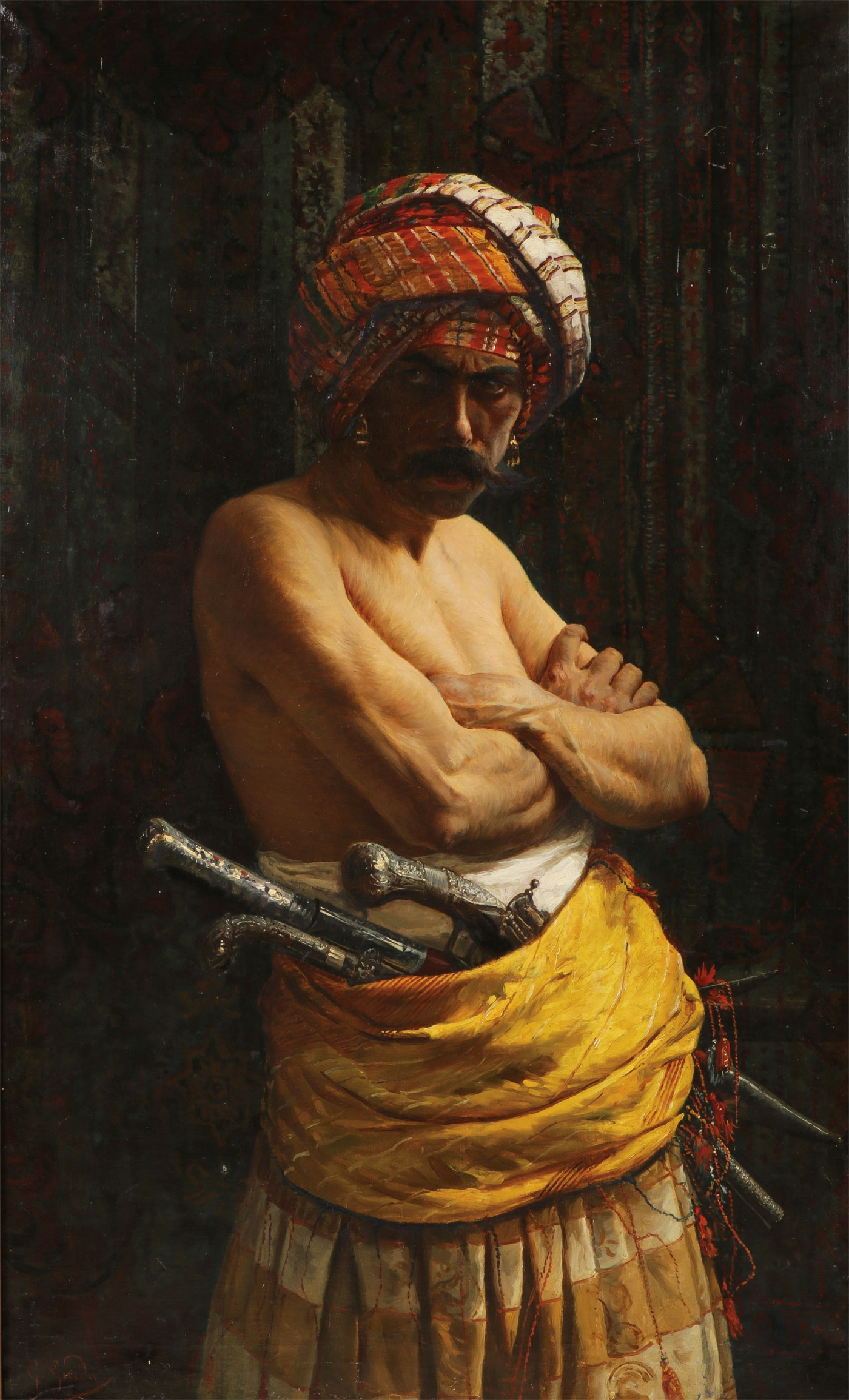
"A Barbary Pirate", by Giovanni Guida (1837-1895)

The corsair captains were joined by adventurers from many parts of the Mediterranean. Non-Turks who came to Algiers as captives of Algerian corsairs gained admittance to the ta'ifa of raïs through conversion to Islam and by virtue of their knowledge of the areas the corsairs raided. The rank of raïs or commander of a corso vessel, was obtained only after an examination passed before the council of raïs, chaired by the captain (admiral) and reserved for the oldest of the raïs, who no longer sailed. Another captain chosen by the council commanded the fleet. A rais was the absolute master on board, where the most rigorous discipline reigned.

The influx of "tenegades", or converts of European origin who brought their knowledge of European coasts and navigation, as well as the expulsion of the Moriscos from Spain, who also imported valuable knowledge in the construction of frigates and brigantines, were important factors in the growth of the fleet and the corso. Based in Cherchell, they knew the Spanish coastline, and around the 1570s, the corso took on the aspect of a private enterprise, even if public investments were allocated to arsenals and ports under pressure from the community and the privateers. According to Diego de Haedo, the fleet of Algiers (including the vessels based at Cherchell) consisted, in 1581, of 35 galiots - including two with 24 benches, one with 23 benches, 11 of 22 benches, 8 of 20 benches, 10 of 18 benches, one with 19 benches, and two with 15 benches — and about 25 frigates (small rowing and undecked vessels), from 8 to 13 benches. More than two thirds of the Algiers galiots were commanded by European renegades (six Genoese, two Venetians, two Albanians, three Greeks, two Spaniards, one Frenchman, one Hungarian, one Sicilian, one Neapolitan, one Corsican and three of their sons). All these renegades occupied key positions. After the founder of the regency of Algiers, Hayreddin Barbarossa, the Sardinian renegade Hasan Agha (1535-1543), the Corsican Hassan Corso (1549-1556), the Calabrian Uluj Ali Pasha (1568-1571) ended up with the title of admiral of the fleet, then the Venetian Hassan Veneziano (1577-1580 and 1582-1583). They also took part in the armies of occupation of the subjected zones like local governments before the creation of the three beyliks; of the 23 territorial bosses, 13 were renegades or sons of renegades. Haedo would be able to say :

"In them, reside almost all the power, the influence, the government and the wealth of Algiers".

— Diego Haëdo, Histoire des rois d'Alger (History of the Kings of Algiers)

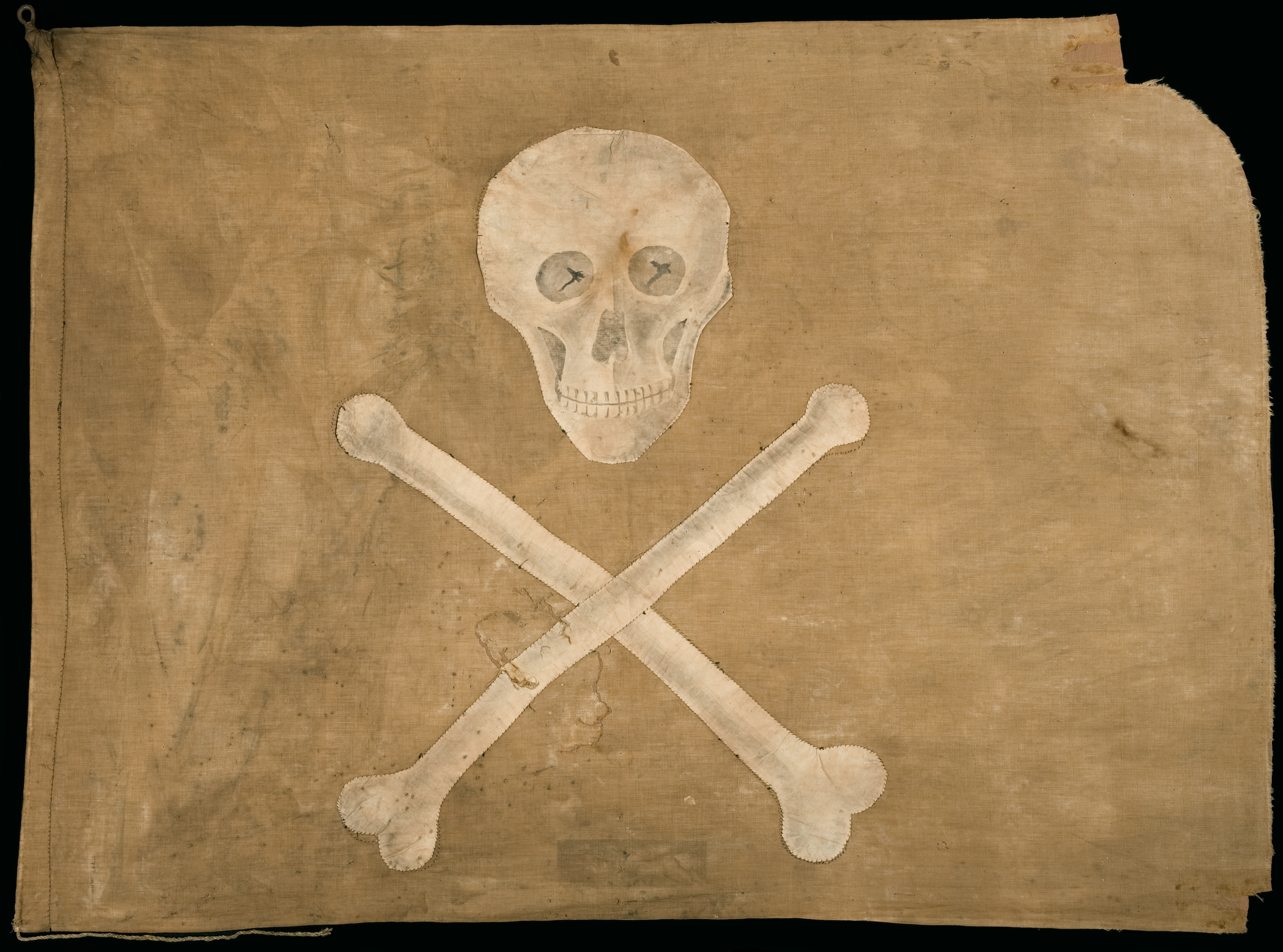
200-year-old pirate flag at the Åland Maritime Museum originating from the North African coast

In the early 17th century, Algiers also became, along with other North African ports such as Tunis, one of the bases for Anglo-Turkish piracy. The peace in Europe forced the Norse privateers to shift their field of activity to the Mediterranean and to serve the enemies of Algiers. Yet many of those privateers converted to Islam and were enlisted in the Algerian corsair Navy. As a result of this privateer spill, international piracy activity in the region intensified to an unprecedented degree. There were as many as 8,000 renegades in the city in 1634.

A contemporary letter stated:

"The infinity of goods, merchandise jewels and treasure taken by our English pirates daily from Christians and carried to Algire and Tunis to the great enriching of Mores and Turks and impoverishing of Christians"

— Contemporary letter sent from Portugal to England.

== Algerian corsair fleet ==
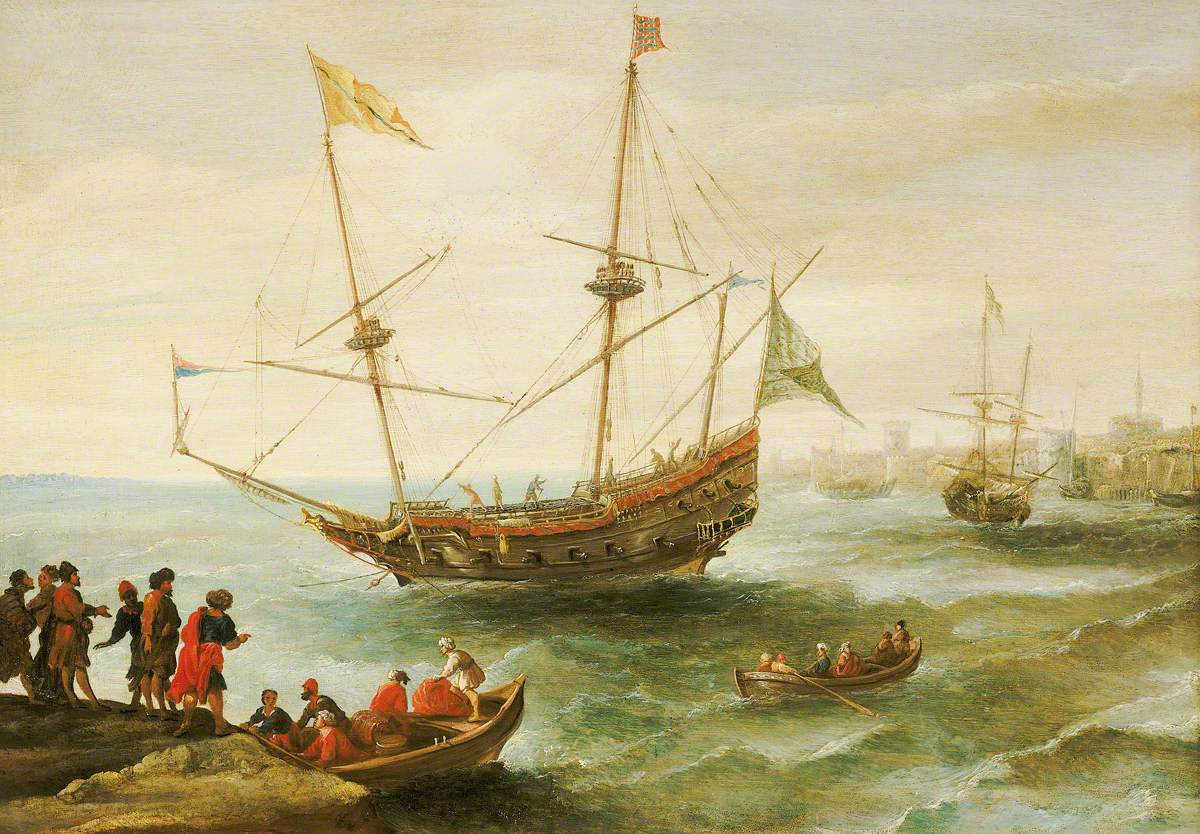
An Algerine Ship off a Barbary Port by Andries van Eertvelt

The Algerians armed for war the captured merchant ships which seemed fit for the corso, and also bought ships in Europe. They had ship construction sites as well, located in Bab-el-Oued for large ships, and in Bab-Azoun for those of smaller dimensions. Christian slaves were employed in these shipyards, the management of which was often entrusted to renegades, even to free Christians, as captains of armament or engineers of naval constructions, who hired their services for a time, without being required to convert to Islam. The masts, yards, sails, ropes, powder, ammunition, and artillery pieces, were supplied by the government of the Ottoman Porte and by certain minor powers of Europe, the latter in the form of tribute.

=== Earlier flotilla ===
At the beginning of the 17th century, Algiers' pirate fleet numbered 100 ships and employed 8,000 to 10,000 men. The piracy "industry" accounted for 25 percent of the workforce of the city, not counting other activities related directly to the port. The fleet averaged 25 ships in the 1680s, but these were larger vessels than had been used the 1620s, thus the fleet still employed some 7,000 men.

The introduction of round ships by the Flemish corsair Zymen Danseker and the arrival of expelled Moriscos from Spain contributed strongly to the development of the fleet of Algiers, which was modernized and enlarged, it numbered as follows:

- In 1625, the corsair fleet included six Galleasses, a large number of brigantines and a hundred Galleyes, more than sixty of them were equipped with 24 to 40 guns.
- In 1630, about 70 ships were in the port of the capital, with what the Algerians owned from the French years prior, and
- in 1632, 13 galleys were in the port, all of which were driven by oars, and 70 others with sails, and 23 boats of 30 to 50 cannons.
- In 1634, the Algerian fleet consisted of 70 vessels, each of which was armed with between 25 and 40 cannons.
- In 1657, the number decreased to 23 ships, and each ship included 30 to 50 cannons.
- In 1662, there were 22 barges and nine galleys in the capital, and in 1681 there were only 17 barges and two large ships with heavy weapons of 112 cannons. These 17 ships were mentioned by their names in the report of Sieur Hayet, among them: the Golden Mare, the Rose, the little Rose, the city of Algiers, the Marzouk, the Canaria.
- On the consul's Fiolle report, he says that in 1686: "The ship called "the Golden Rose" was armed with 40 cannons, the "Seven Stars" with 30 cannons, the "Golden Lion" equipped with 32 cannons, and that there were also on this date, 10 ships with two bridges, each containing 30 cannons, and 10 single-barreled ships, each containing 14 cannons, sometimes reaching 20. There were also two ships with two bridges containing 45 cannons and a fire equipped with 20 cannons, and five other ships, two of them with 50 cannons, two with 30 cannons, and besides that, there were 39 ships for transport and trade".
- It came in the report of Dr. Duke de Grafton dated October 14, 1687, that the number of Algerian ships in the diversity of their forms and the difference in weight and their cargo amounted to 60 ships, which had 570 cannons in total.

=== Later navy ===
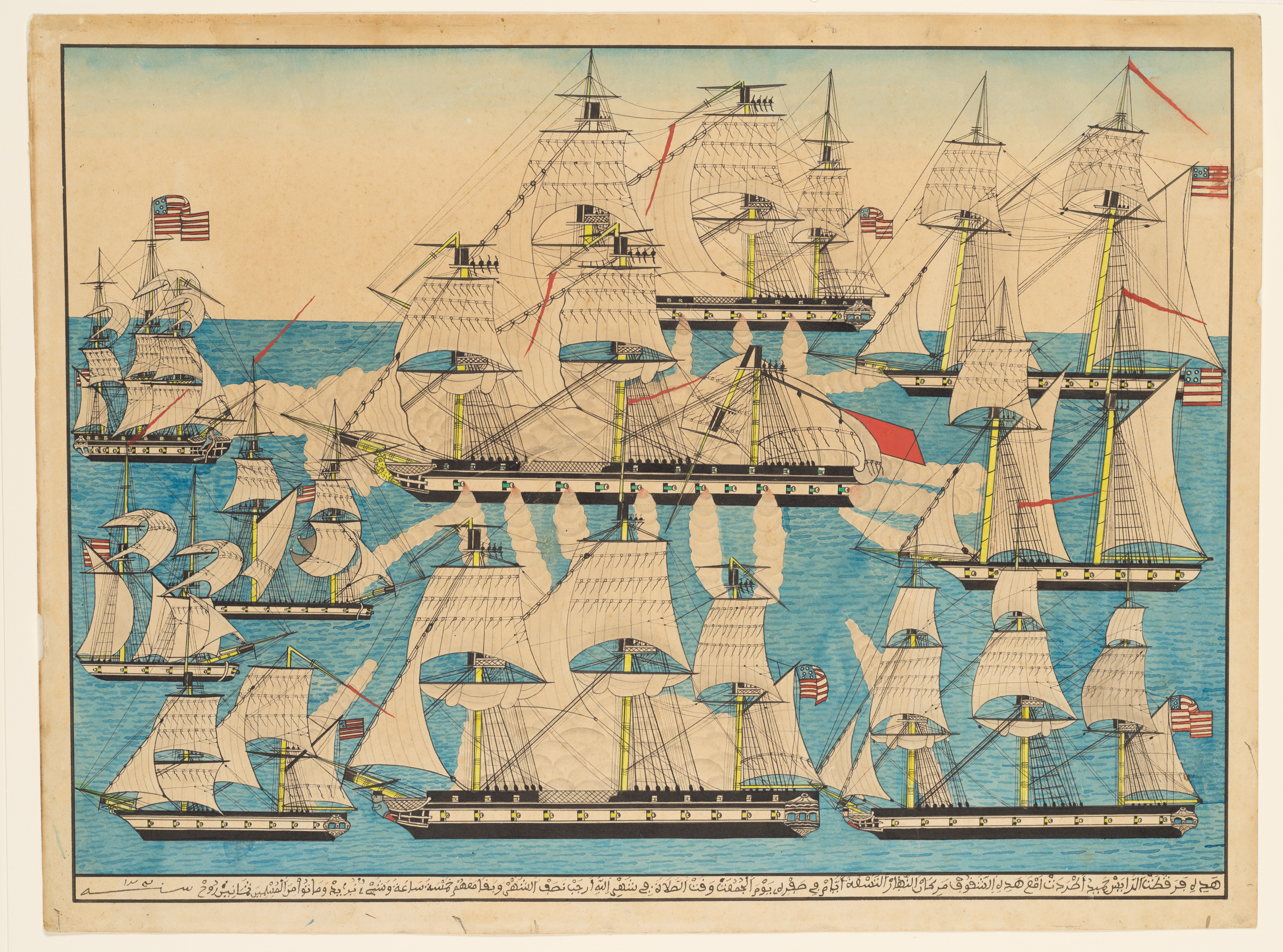
Rais Hamidou's Algerian flagship "Mashuda" in the battle off Cape Gata (1815) against Stephen Decatur's "USS Constitution"

In the 18th century the number of Algerian ships diminished and was varying from 20 to 30 ships and were mostly Xebecs armed with 12 to 32 cannons.

- During the Barbary Wars the said number increased in 1802 to 66 barges, each with between 25 and 80 long-range cannons
- In 1815, the number decreased to 41 ships, and there were only five battleships, the General Consul of the United States of America William Shaler tells about the Algerian Navy in 1815: "The Algerian fleet was composed of five frigates with 38 to 50 cannons and five corvettes".
- In 1816, four barges and 30 ships. Gouthrot says on that date only two battleships of 50 to 60 cannons, two corvettes with five cannons, two barges of 80 cannons, four galleys of 15 to 26 cannons, and one ship of 20 cannon of the polacre type, and 35 ships.
- In 1820, 32 ships numbering 368 cannons.

Among these ships were the well-known "Al-Marikana", the famous "Mashouda" and the 44 cannon captured vessel "Portuguesa", the latter was captured by Rais Hamidou from the Portuguese navy in May 1802 with 282 prisoners, but then it was lost and others were burned when Lord admiral Exmouth attacked Algiers in 1816. There are also names for other ships, such as the Miftah al-Salam, Dik al-Marsa, Guide to Alexandria, and others seized.by the Algerian Navy, which left them with the names by which they were previously known.

== How the corsairs operated ==
=== Jihad against Spain: Barbary galleys in the Mediterranean ===
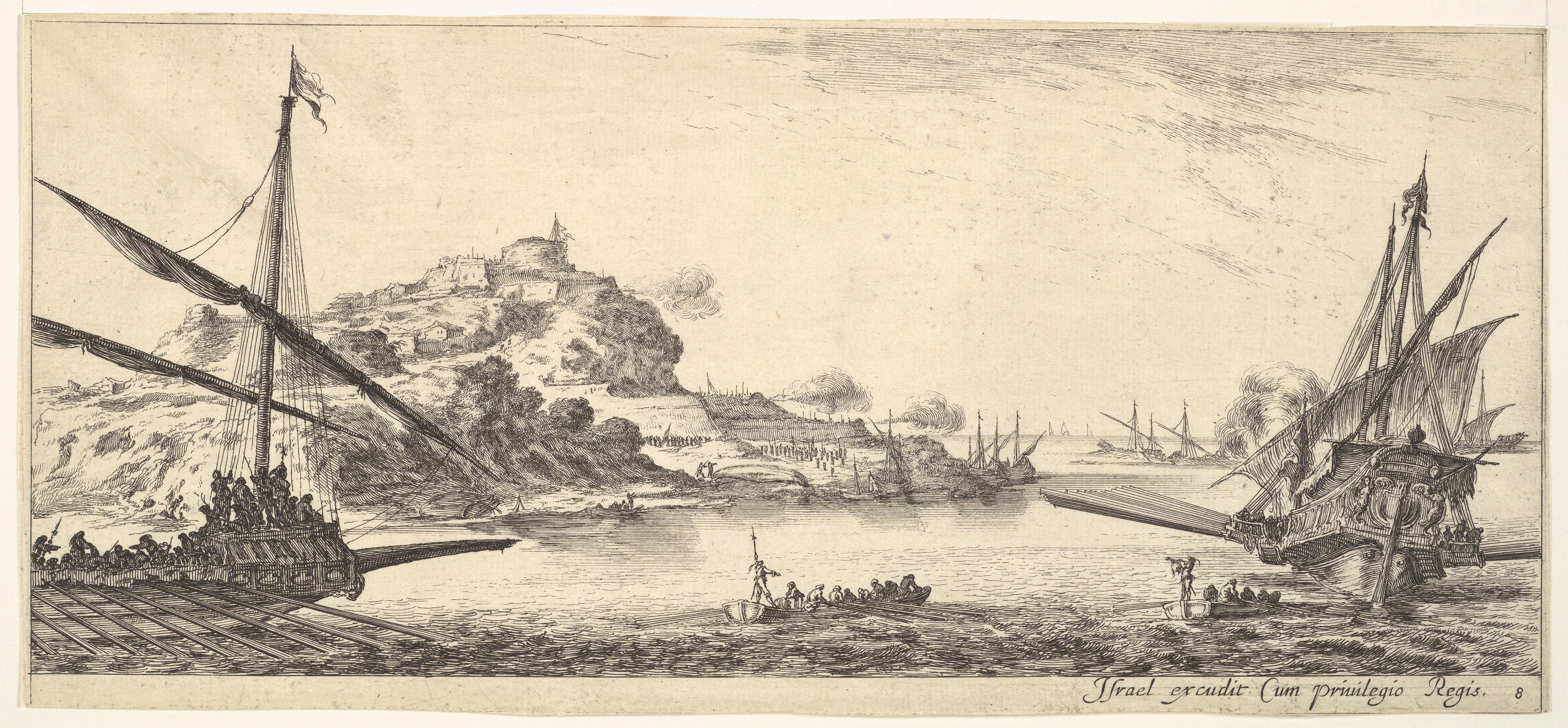
Barbary galleys

During most of the 16th century, maritime wars were undertaken with fleets of thirty to forty galleys. The Barbary galleys formed the Western naval division of the Ottoman fleets. Their special function was to harm the hereditary enemy, Spain, by ravaging its coasts, landing unexpectedly in enemy territory, sacking villages and towns as it had at Lipari, Naples and Genoa and carrying off their inhabitants into captivity. The Spanish watch towers and defense networks could not hold off the corsairs in Cullera and Villajoyosa, and so the tierras maritimas (coastal lands) were abandoned.

Attacks on Christian and especially Catholic shipping, with slavery for the captured, became prevalent in Algiers and were actually the main industry and source of revenues of the Regency. The corsairs targeted Spanish commerce, and interrupted maritime communications with Spanish domains in Italy by boarding vessels, capturing crews and cargoes and taking everything back to Algiers, enriching it at the expense of Spanish trade.

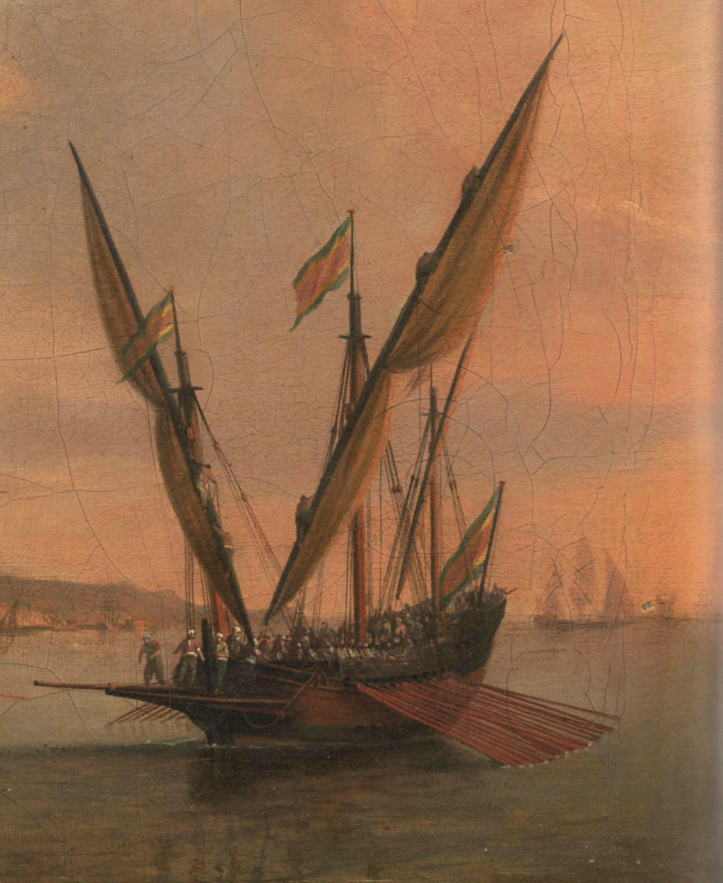
Algerine xebec near Gibraltar, by Dominic Serres (1722-1793)

The severe discipline and care, made the Algiers galley a war instrument of the first order; the damage that the rais caused the enemies of the Ottoman sultan was so significant that Spanish Benedictine and historian Diego Haëdo wrote:

Sailing without any fear, they travel the sea from east to west, making fun of our galleys, whose crews, meanwhile, enjoy banqueting in the ports. Knowing well that when their galiotes, so well equipped, so light, encounter the Christian galleys, so heavy and so crowded, the latter cannot think of giving chase, and preventing them from pillaging and stealing at will. They have the habit, to mock them, of tacking, and showing them the stern... They are so careful about the order, cleanliness and layout of their ships, that they do not think about something else, focusing especially on good tie-down, to be able to line and tack well. It is for this reason that they do not have rumbalières... Finally, for this same reason, it is not permitted for anyone, even the son of the pasha himself, to change places, nor to move from where he is.

— Diego de Haedo, Topographia e Historia general de Argel

Algerian corsairs provided much needed help to the attempted rebellion of the Moriscos. In this long war, the raïs of Algiers had no rival; They showed incessant ardor and temerity almost always crowned with success. At a signal from the Sultan, they were seen running forward and fighting in the front ranks, as in Bejaïa, Malta, Lepanto and Tunis, where they acquired the well-deserved reputation of being the best and bravest sailors in the Mediterranean. French writer Louis de Baudicour wrote:

Algiers had become the firmest support of the Sultans of Constantinople. No event took place in the Mediterranean basin without the Algerian corsairs taking part in it. The main force of the entire Ottoman Navy rested on them.

=== Atlantic razzias: Hunt for enemy merchant ships ===
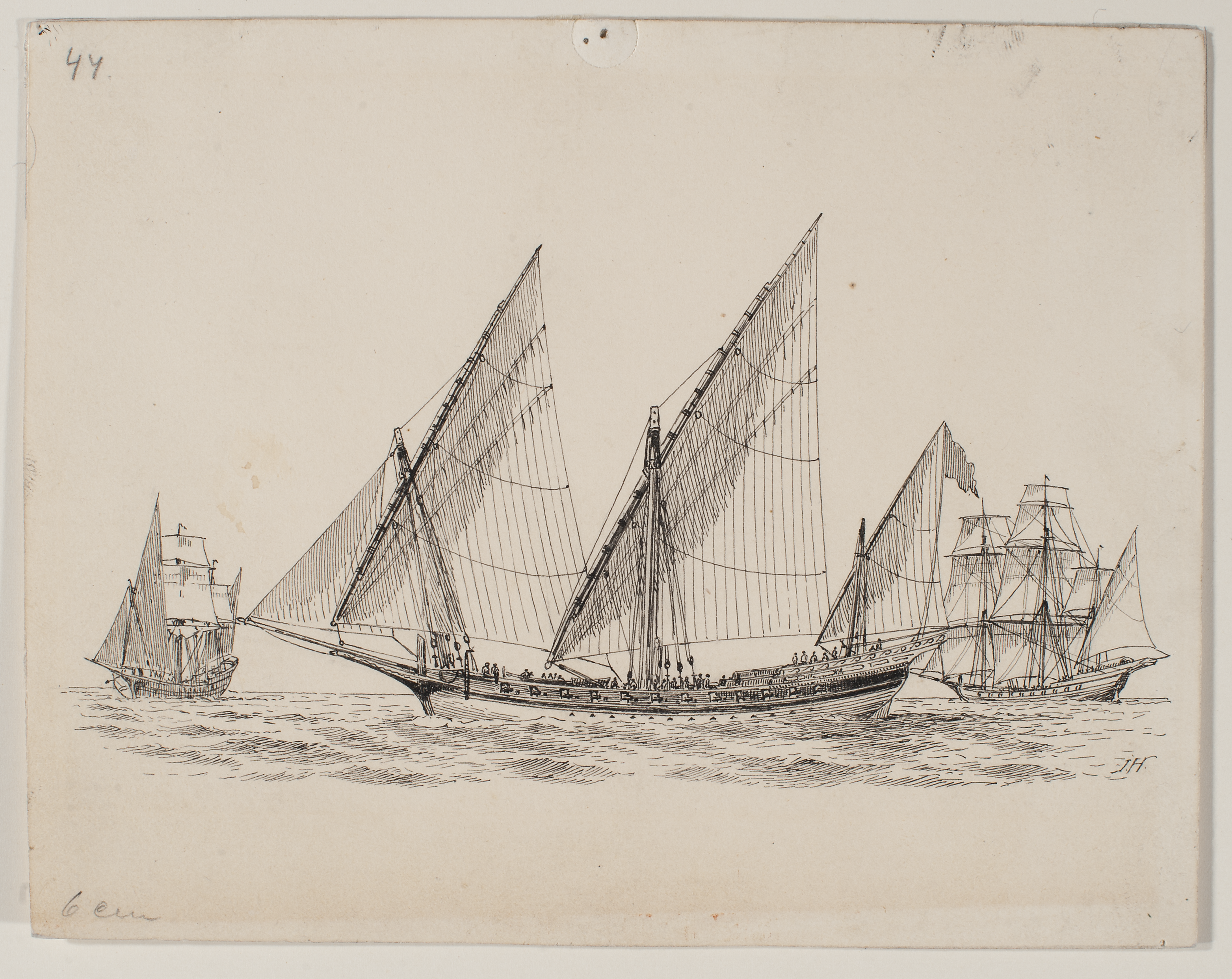
Xebec types, by Jacob Hägg (1839–1931)

Ra'ises (captains of corsair ships) such as Murat Rais the Elder in the 1580s and Hamidou Raïs at the turn of the 19th century distinguished themselves through audacious attacks on Christian ships and bringing important prizes to Algiers.

Mediterranean ships were at first the main targets of the corsairs, but the raïs appeared in the oceans as soon as they adopted the use of round vessels. Exploring the routes of India and America, they disturbed the commerce of all enemy nations. In 1616, Rais Mourad the Younger (Jan Janszoon) plundered the coasts of Iceland, from where he brought back to Algiers 400 captives. In 1619 the corsairs ravaged Madeira. In 1631, they sacked Baltimore in Ireland, blocked the English Channel, and seized ships in the North Sea towards the 1650s. Algerian pirate naval warfare was intelligent and flexible, but its countermeasures were incredibly clumsy. The Algerians used xebecs, fast-sailed galleys, to attack individual merchant ships when there was no wind. Algerians usually hid five to seven xebecs behind a large cliff near the coast, each with at least 100 soldiers. A clifftop lookout would spot European ships and signal them to approach. Europeans usually surrendered quickly when faced with a much superior attacking force. In the defense, the corsairs usually expected only the death of many sailors and certain defeat.

The raïs pushed audacity so far as to found in Livorno, with the authorization of the Grand Duke of Tuscany, to whom they paid high royalties, a penal colony warehouse, where they came to deposit under the guard of the soldiers of the Grand Duke, the Christian slaves likely to obtain their freedom by means of a ransom. They still had a station at Cape Verde to be nearer to stopping the Indian galleons. The Republic of Genoa tolerated for a very long time the traffic in its ports of goods coming from the looting of the rais.

=== Naval spoils ===
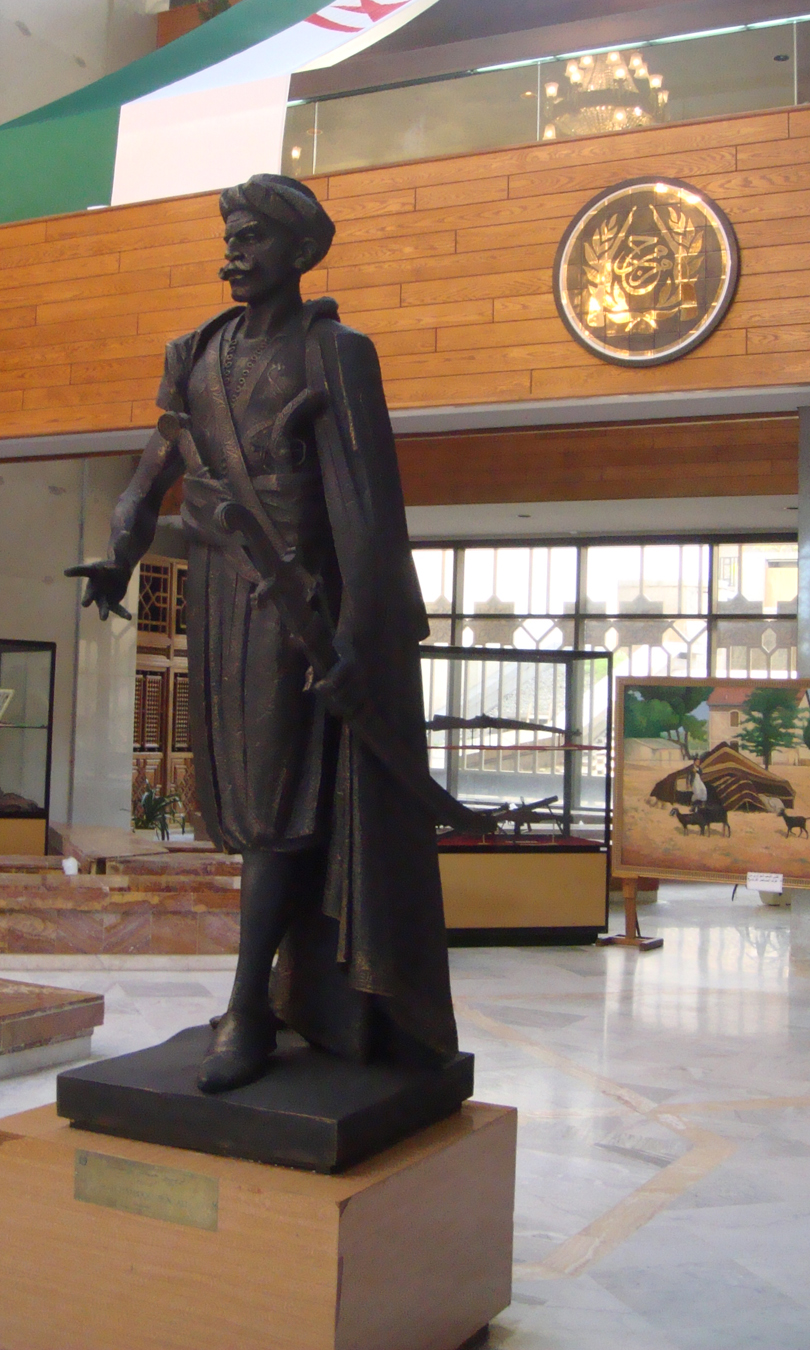
Rais Hamidou: famous Algerian corsair of the 18th century

The spoils of the Corsairs multiplied in the first period of the regency, then began to decrease until they almost disappeared in the eighteenth century. By the end of the deys period they witnessed a remarkable growth with the attempt to develop the navy and increase its military activity, especially during the period of Europe's preoccupation with the wars of the French Revolution and the conquests of Napoleon. The renewed activity of the Algerian Navy was linked to the efforts of sailors led by Rais Hamidou (1790-1815). Of the naval spoils, the state used to take one fifth, and distribute the rest to the shipowners who had contributed to equipping the fleet.

Spoils according to years

- 1556: 28 ships were captured near Málaga and 50 others near Gibraltar strait
- 1608 - 1621: Nearly 1000 European ships were captured, among them 447 of Dutch nationality, 193 French, 120 Spanish, 60 English, and 50 from various German principalities. More than 12,000 people were enslaved.
- 1619 - 1627: More than 20,000 people were captured
- 1628 - 1634: 80 ships were captured during the war against France with 1331 people, which made the value of the total spoils in that war rise to about 4,752,000 pounds. Pere dan estimated the value of seized cargo at around 20,000,000 francs, and one million people enslaved.
- 1737 - 1799: the rais took 376 ships. In 1785, Genoese, Venetian and Neapolitan ships were captured, their spoils estimated at 75,000,000 francs. In 1793, 11 American ships were captured and 100 American sailors were enslaved, then 16 Portuguese ships were captured by Rais Hamidou in 1797 along with 118 prisoners.
- 1800 - 1802: The spoils were estimated at 575,152 francs, and 20 ships were seized, of which 19 were Neapolitan, in addition to another Portuguese ship seized by Rais Hamidou, equipped with 44 cannons, its value estimated at 194,231.25 francs.
- 1805 - 1815: The value of spoils was estimated at 8 million francs, from 1800 prisoners and 30 ships. A truce in 1810 was followed by the treaty of 1813 with Portugal, in which 541 Portuguese prisoners were ransomed for 850,000 Algerian doro
- 1825: The spoils reached eight ships, mostly Dutch, Spanish and English, with an estimated value of about 770,415.74 francs.
- 1817 - 1827: the value of spoils was approximately 700,000 francs, with 26 Greek ships seized.

== Corsair city of Algiers ==
=== Defences ===
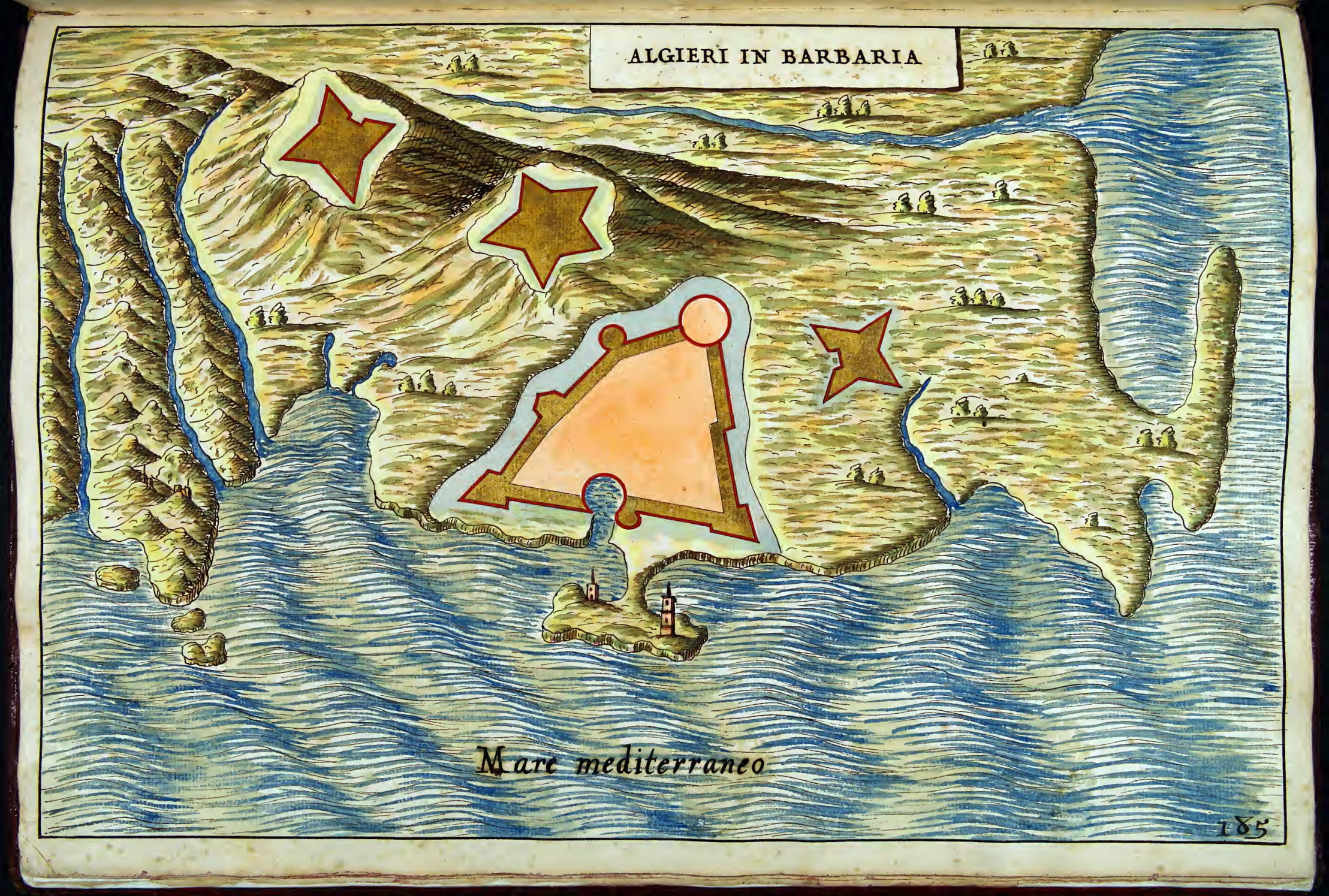
Algiers in one of the maps of cities and fortresses in the Atlante Neroni of 1602

In 1529, Hayreddin Barbarossa seized the Peñon facing the city of Algiers from the Spanish and linked the rock to the port by building a pier. This allowed Algiers to become a secure port for naval and corsair companies. The city became the main base for corsairs in the Mediterranean. This domination enabled him to repel several attacks from a number of European countries, in particular, in October 1541, that of Charles V, Holy Roman Emperor, whose troops were defeated by the forces of the regency under the command of Hassan Agha, well aided by a storm which destroyed a good part of the enemy fleet.

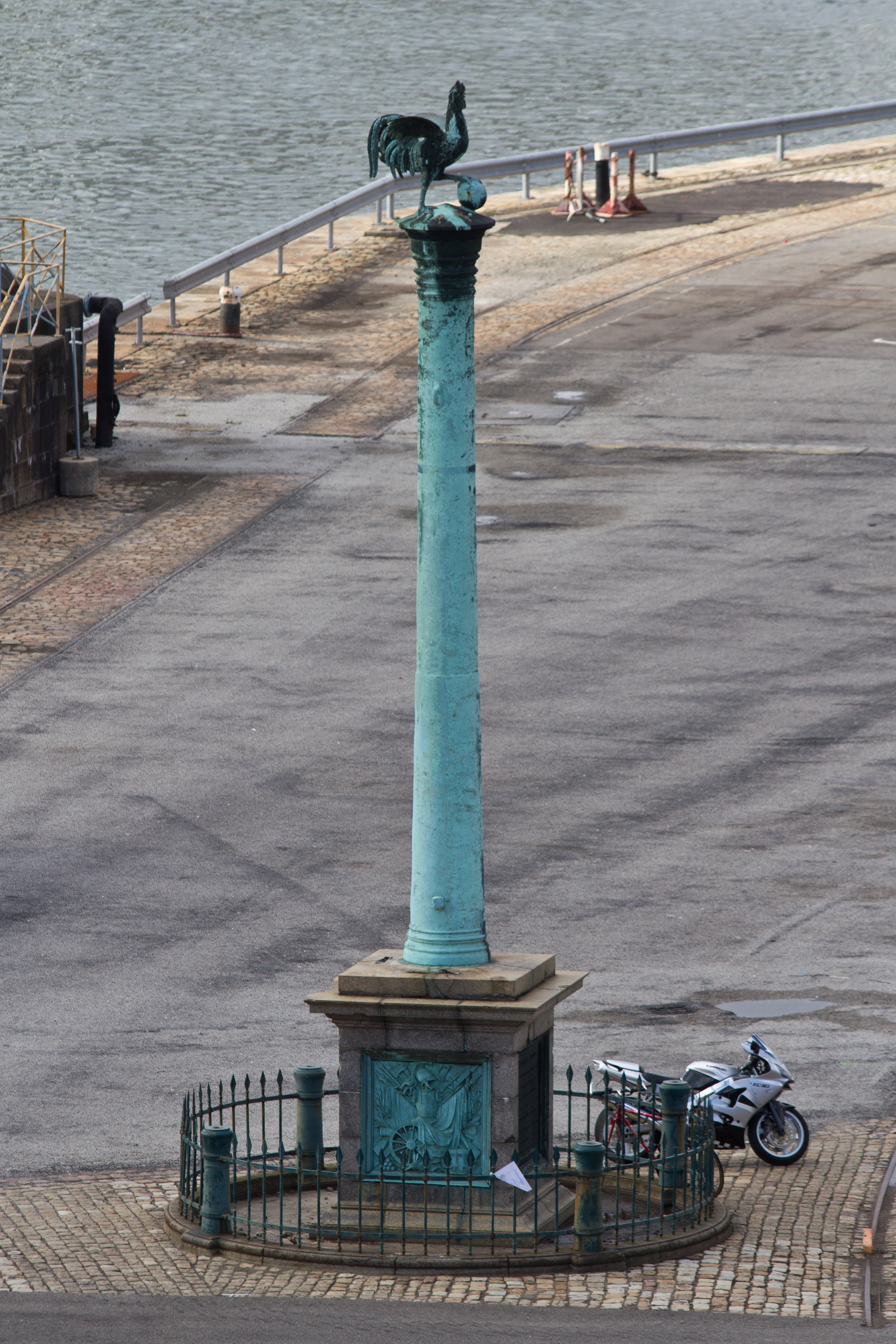
The Consulaire cannon (a.k.a. Baba Merzoug), in Brest arsenal

In response Hassan Agha ordered the construction of a large artillery piece, designed in the foundries of Dar Ennahas, near the Bab El Oued gate in 1542, by a Venetian master builder in the pay of the beylerbey of Algiers, Hassan Agha. The cannon was placed during the completion of the "Kheir Eddine pier" at the end, on the Bordj Amar.

Oruç Barbarossa built a new kasbah a little above the previous Berber kasbah. Hayreddin and his successors rebuilt the wall surrounding the town, 36 t42 feet high, and some one and a half miles in length, of unbaked brick bonded with good mortar, resting on a substructure of concrete. The sea-front, though thick and high, was not solid enough to resist massive assaults. The wall accordingly was protected by a moat some 20 to 26 feet deep and 37 to 48 feet across, reinforced by square towers and slightly projecting bastions. Two more large works protected Khair al-Din. The breakwater and the Fishery Arsenal were protected by the parapet, crenellated and pierced with embrasures for muskets and cannon. Access to the town was through five main gates. The Bab Jdid or New Gate was to the south-west at the foot of the kasbah, Bab Azoun was to the south, the most important since people entered this way from the hinterland It was linked by a long mercantile street to the Bab al-Oued to the north. The 'Island' or 'Holy War' gate (Bāb al-Jazira or Bab al-Jihad), through which the raïs passed, opened on to the mole, and finally the 'Fish', 'Fishery' or 'Customs' gate (Bab Es-serdin), opened onto the road leading up from the harbour.

Outside the wall several forts supplemented the seafront fortifications. The Eulj 'Ali burj, built in 1568-1569 and known as the 'fort of the twenty-four hours', guarded the Bab al-Oued beach. On the landward side the approaches to the town were defended by the fort known as the 'Star', built above the kasbah in 1568, and the Emperor Fort (Sultan Kalassi) built facing south between 1545 and 1580 on the site of the camp of Charles V.

=== Urban area ===
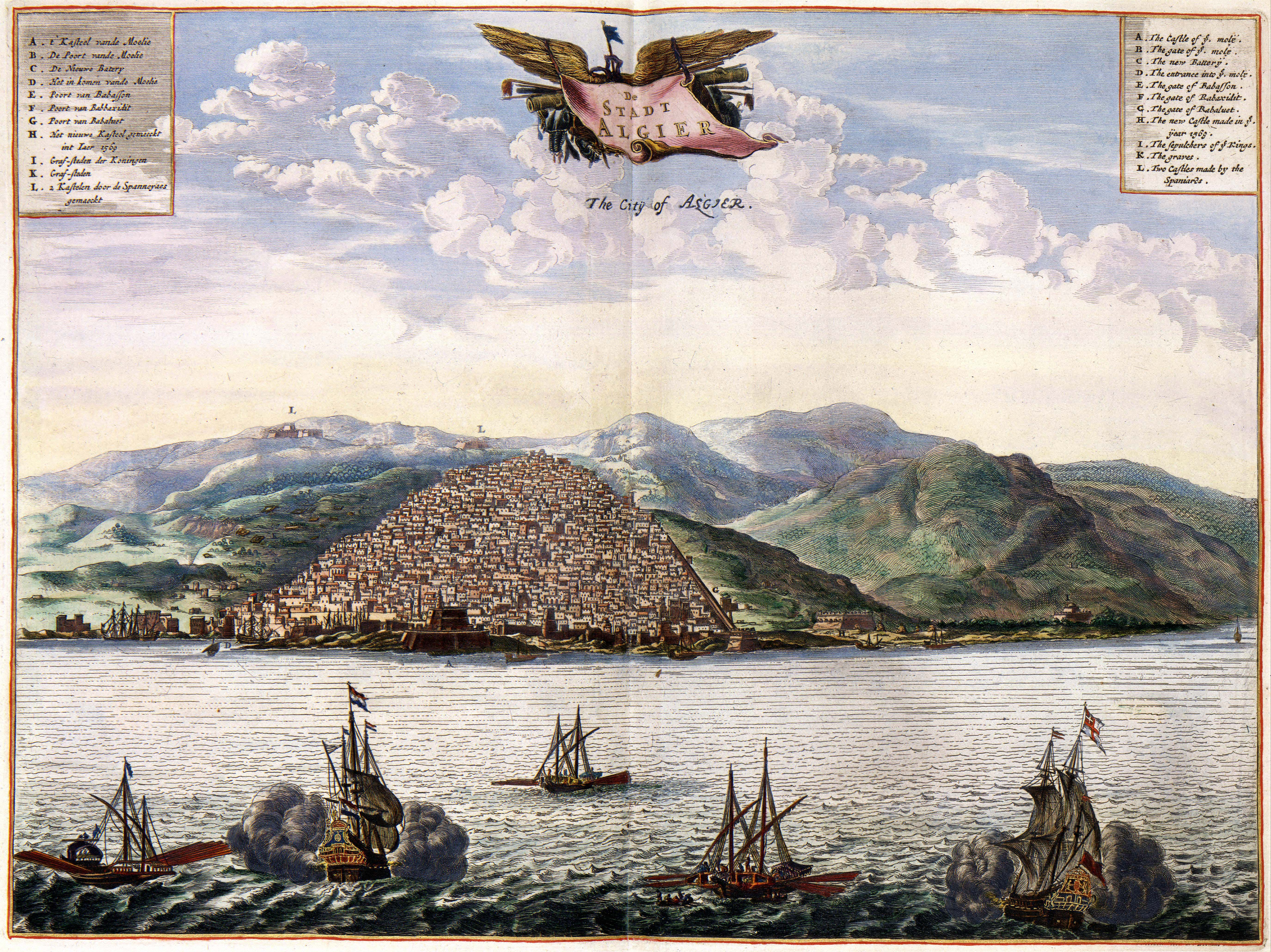
City of Algiers, 17th century

In the confined space enclosed within the walls white houses were grouped closely together with terraces rising in tiers, their overhanging canopies supported on beams jutting so far out over the narrow streets as to sometimes meet those across the way, thus forming a ceiling of corduroy or of groined vaulting. It was not until the end of the fifteenth century that the rais built their costly dwellings in the lower town. In Algiers, as in the other Barbary ports, the captains tended to maintain houses in the western part of the city, close to the kasbah, with their crews quartered close by. This was a precaution against any attack by political or domestic opponents, and it helped to ensure that the community of privateers formed an identifiable political and social bloc in the city. These new constructions modified the outward aspect of the town, which remained a Maghrebi city, although the greater part of the inhabitants were not of the Maghreb. Likewise, the interior arrangement of some rich houses was no longer of Maghrebi style.

According to Diego de Haëdo, about the year 1580 Algiers had a hundred mosques, chapels or zawiyas, not one of which survives. There were 'prayer halls with parallel naves and pitched tile roofs'.

== Christian captives ==
=== Share and use of slaves ===
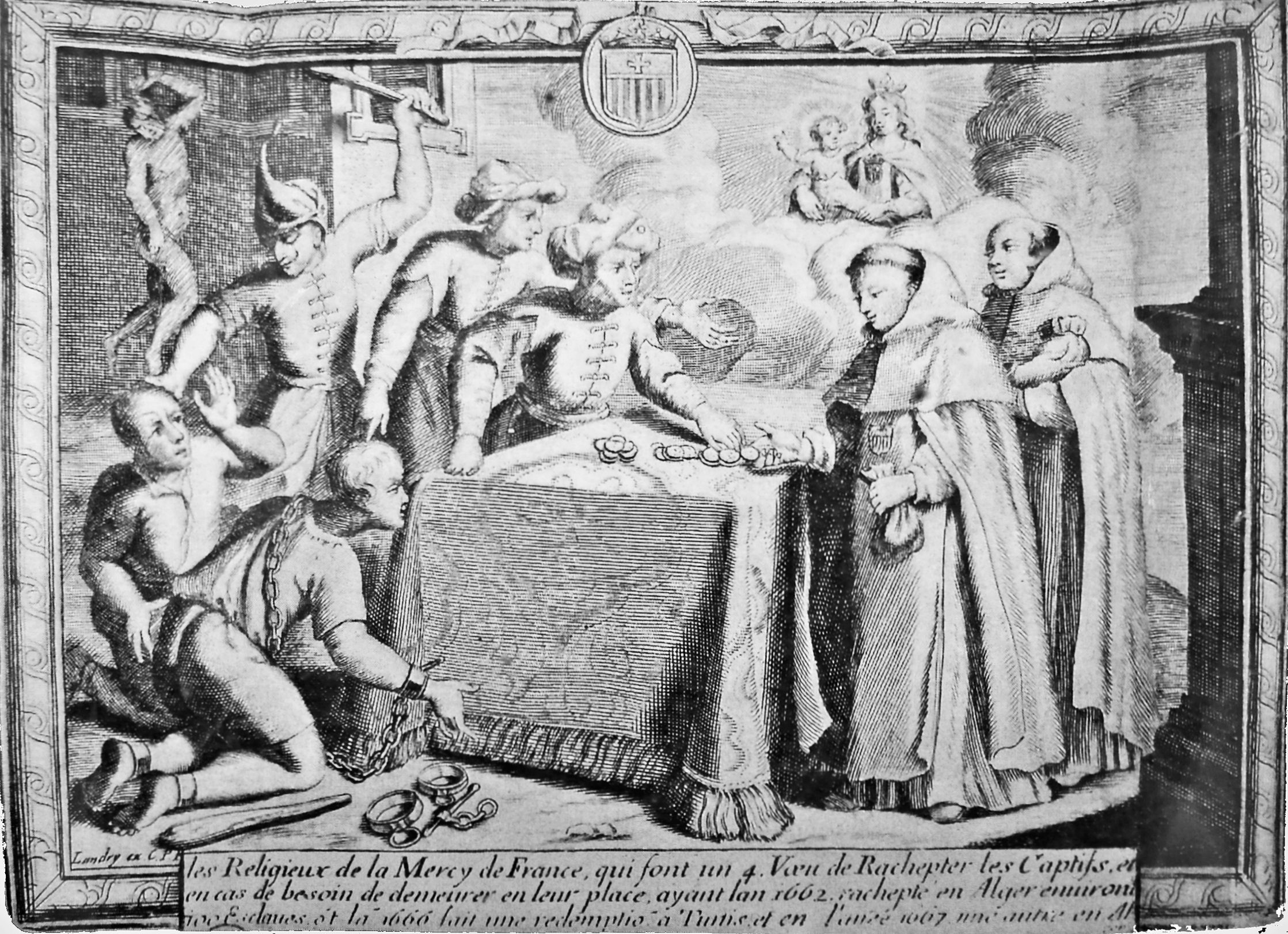
Purchase of Christian slaves by French friars (Religieux de la Mercy de France) in Algiers in 1662

When a corsair ship returned to Algiers towing its booty, goods and captives were landed. The pasha would take his fifth, in addition to the body and tackle of the captured ship, then the cargo was sold. The slaves not chosen by the pasha were led into the Badestan, a long street closed at both ends, located on the site of the current Mahon square in Algiers. There, brokers ran the captives naked, so that buyers could make their selections. Half of the proceeds from these sales belonged to the outfitter of the capturing vessel: individual, company, rais himself; the other half was divided into shares, of which forty went to the captain, thirty to the agha of the Janissaries on board, ten to the officers, and the rest to the sailors and the soldiers.

Until the use of round vessels in the 17th century, which did away with oars, the rais composed the crews of their galleys, which were generally very low in the water, with slaves they bought for this purpose, or captured at sea or on the Christian coasts. The rowers were tied to their benches, as many as 300 on a single vessel. When, at the beginning of the 17th century, sail became the only form of navigation, the use of slaves on corso ships diminished notably; but the raïs still employed a few for heavy work: turning the capstan, towing other boats, cleaning and so on.

=== Number of slaves ===
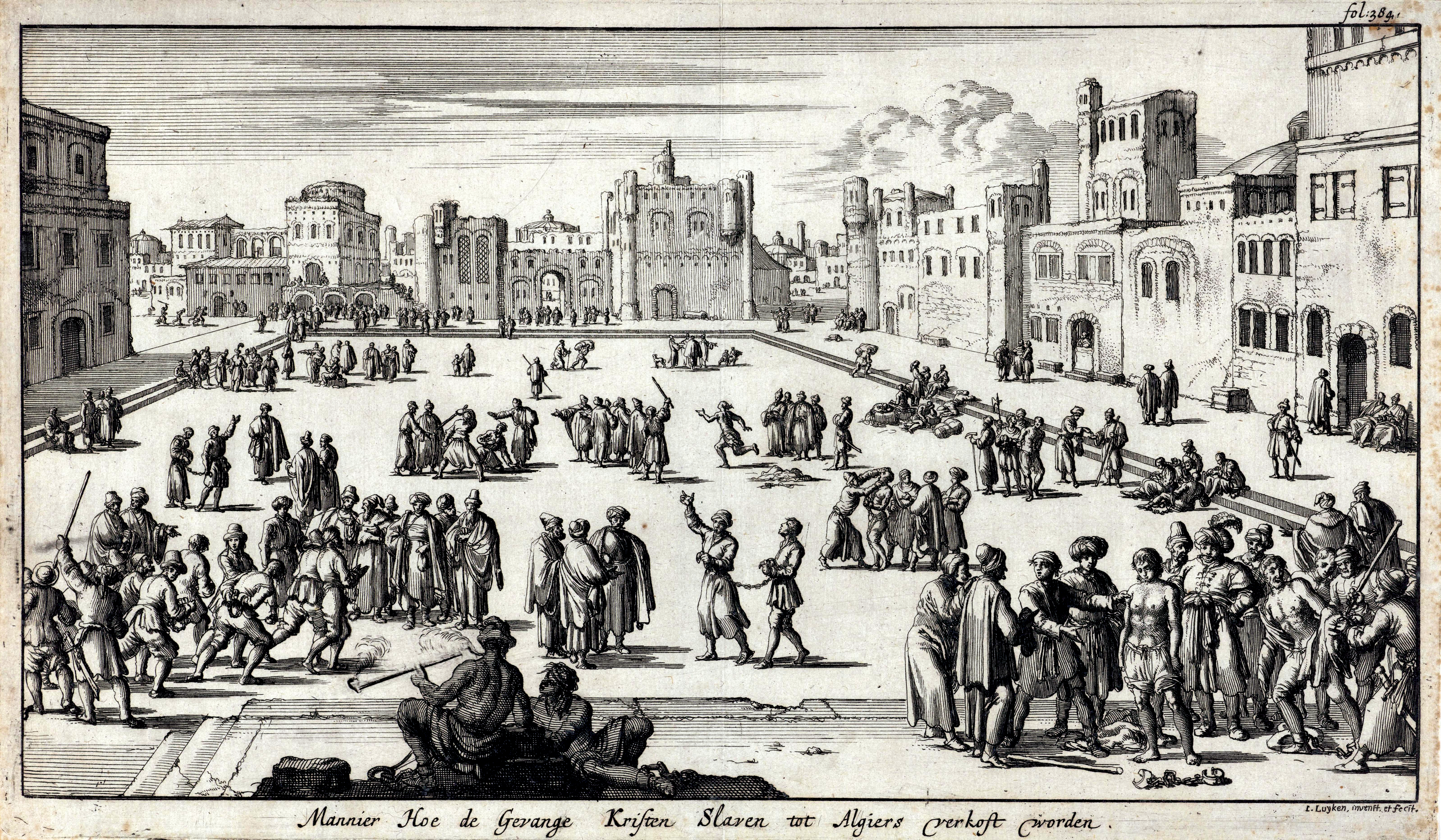
The slave market of Algiers in the early 17th century.

The number of European Christians in captivity in the city of Algiers alone was estimated at about one million people throughout the seventeenth century, equivalent to a quarter of the city's population, numbering at that time about 100,000 people. In the four beylik prisons established specifically for this purpose after 1607, most prisoners were released for ransom, some converted to Islam -- 8000 in 1634 of a total of 35,000 prisoners -- and some were integrated into the population and became an active in society, like many of the beleyrbeys who assumed power before the era of the pashas. The work that these prisoners carried out was divided between social services and economic tasks within the city of Algiers, and agricultural work outside the city of Algiers. The number of prisoners varied from year to year.

The following table extracted from European sources presents aggregate estimates for the city of Algiers according to year:

Christian slaves in Algiers according to European sources
Year	Number of prisoners	Authors	Notes
1580	25,000	Diego Haedo	
1598	15,000	Giovanni Antonio Magini	
1620	35,000	Gramaye	
1634	25,000	Pere Dan	During the war with the King of France (1630 - 1634), 1331 prisoners were captured on 80 French ships
1640	30,000 to 40,000	Aranda	Including those who were in the prisons of Ali Bitchin Reis
1662	40,000	Auvry	
1683	35,000 to 40,000	Pétis de la Croix	
1700	8,000 to 10,000	Comelin	
1729	9,000 to 10,000	Fau	
1785	6000	Venture de Paradis	
1816	1642	De Grammont	2000 freed by Lord Exmouth
1830	122	Rozet	

Among the most famous of these prisoners were:

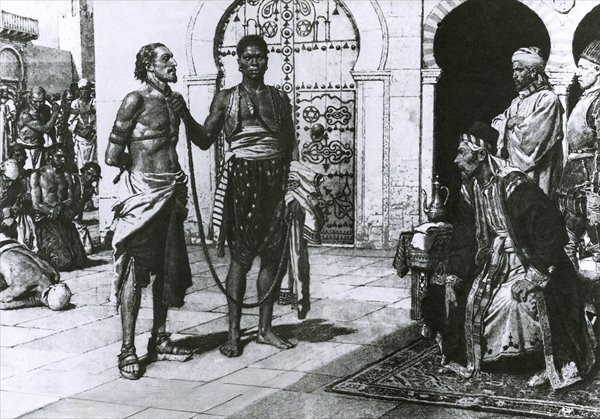
Cervantes brought before Hassan Veneziano Pasha, beylerbey of Algiers

1. French scientist Petrus Gyllius, captured in 1546 while traveling from France to Greece on a scientific mission at the request of King Francis I of France.
2. Dominique de Gourgues, the hero of Florida County, captured while traveling from Europe to America (1558).
3. Famous Italian painter Fra Filippo Lippi de Madone, imprisoned in 1435
4. Italian writer Emmanuel d'Aranda de Bruges, captured while traveling from France to Spain in 1640.
5. French comic poet, who wrote the story known as the Beautiful Provençal, Jean-François Regnard, captured in 1678.
6. Famous Spanish writer Miguel de Cervantes, author of Don Quixote and the Moriscan plays inspired by his memories in Algeria. He remained in captivity in Algeria from 1575 to 1580.
7. French scientist Jean Foy-Vaillant was captured in 1674, when he was on a scientific trip to study money, commissioned by King Louis XIV.
8. Italian cleric apriest of the city of Catania, called Caraccioli, captured in 1561.
9. Italian poet Antonio Veneziano, captured along with Don Carlo Davagona in April 1578.
10. Writer Rene de Bois (Rene de Boys), captured in 1642.

Privateers and enslavemement of Christians originating from Algiers were major problems for centuries, leading to regular punitive expeditions by European powers:

- Spain (1567, 1775, 1783)
- Denmark (1770)
- France (1661, 1665, 1682, 1683, 1688)
- England (1622, 1655, 1672)

All led to naval bombardment of Algiers. Abraham Duquesne fought Barbary pirates in 1681 and bombarded Algiers between 1682 and 1683 to help Christian captives.

== Emblems ==
18th

Example of a flag used by Algerian privateers

Regency war standard from John Beaumont's album (1705).

Pavilion of the dey of Algiers according to the album by John Beaumont (1705).

Type of maritime flag of the regency of Algiers

Type of maritime flag of the regency of Algiers.

Example of a flag used by corsairs of the Algiers regency.

Example of a flag used by corsairs of the Algiers regency.

Type of maritime flag of the regency of Algiers.

A pavilion of the regency of Algiers

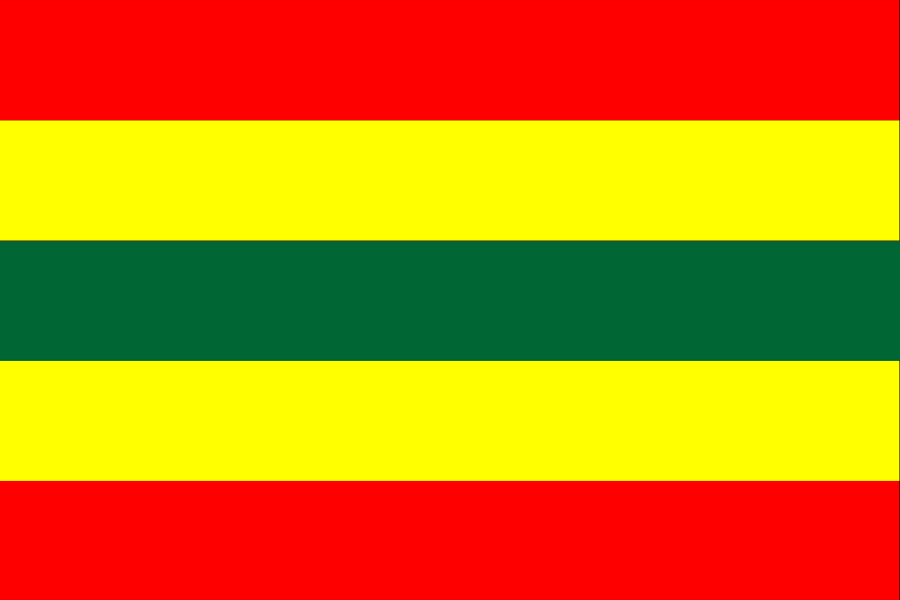
A standard of the regency of Algiers

Pavilion of the Regency of Algiers (17th-18th centuries)(B. Dubreuil)

== Gallery ==
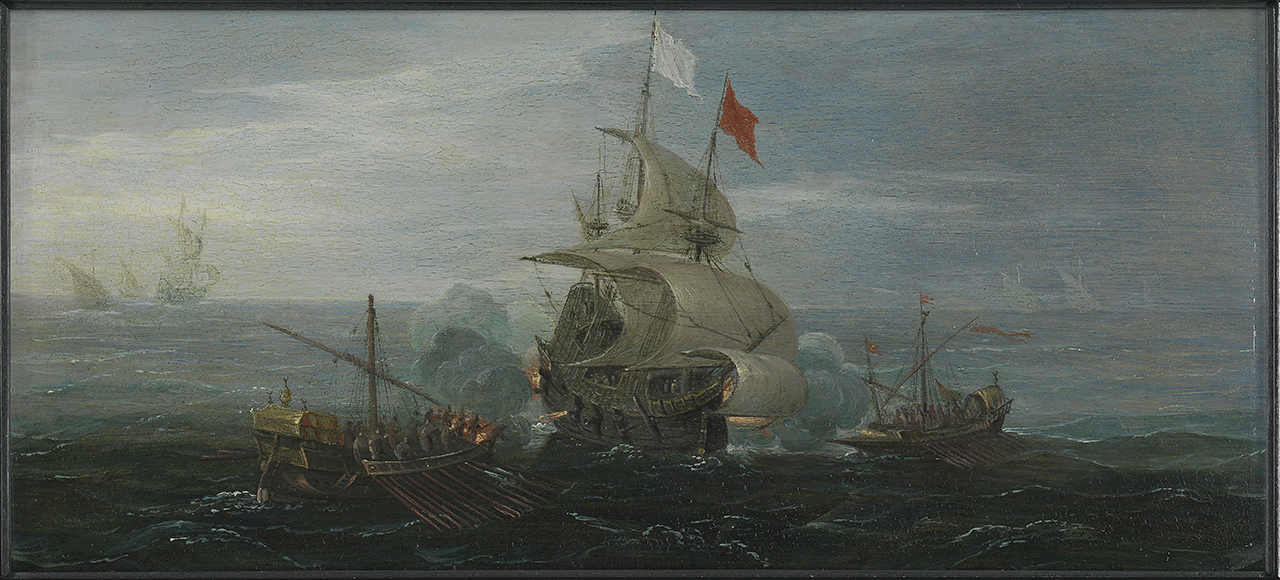
A French Ship and Barbary Pirates by Aert Anthoniszoon and Cornelis Bol

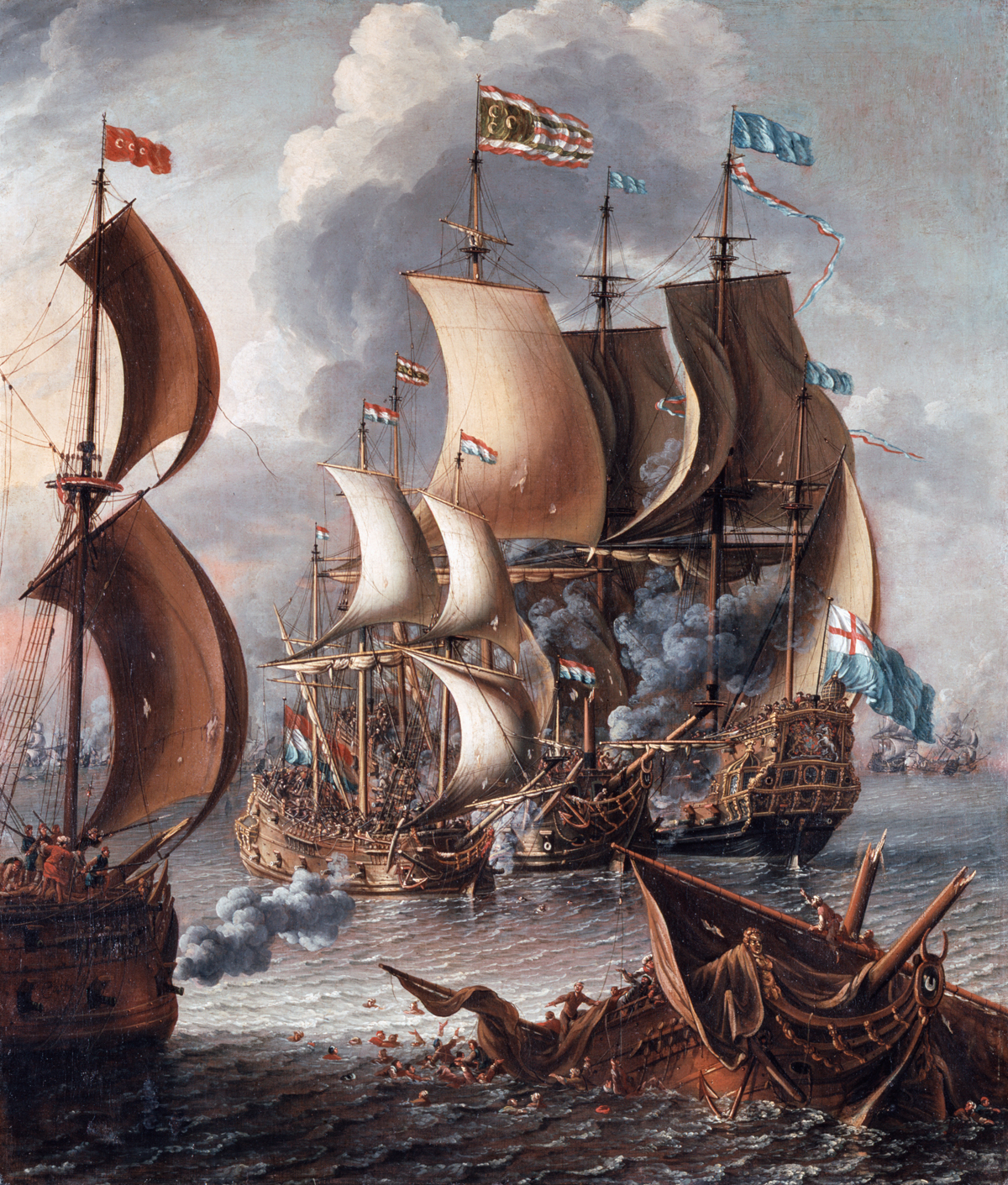
A Sea Fight with Barbary Corsair by Laureys a Castro (1664–1700)

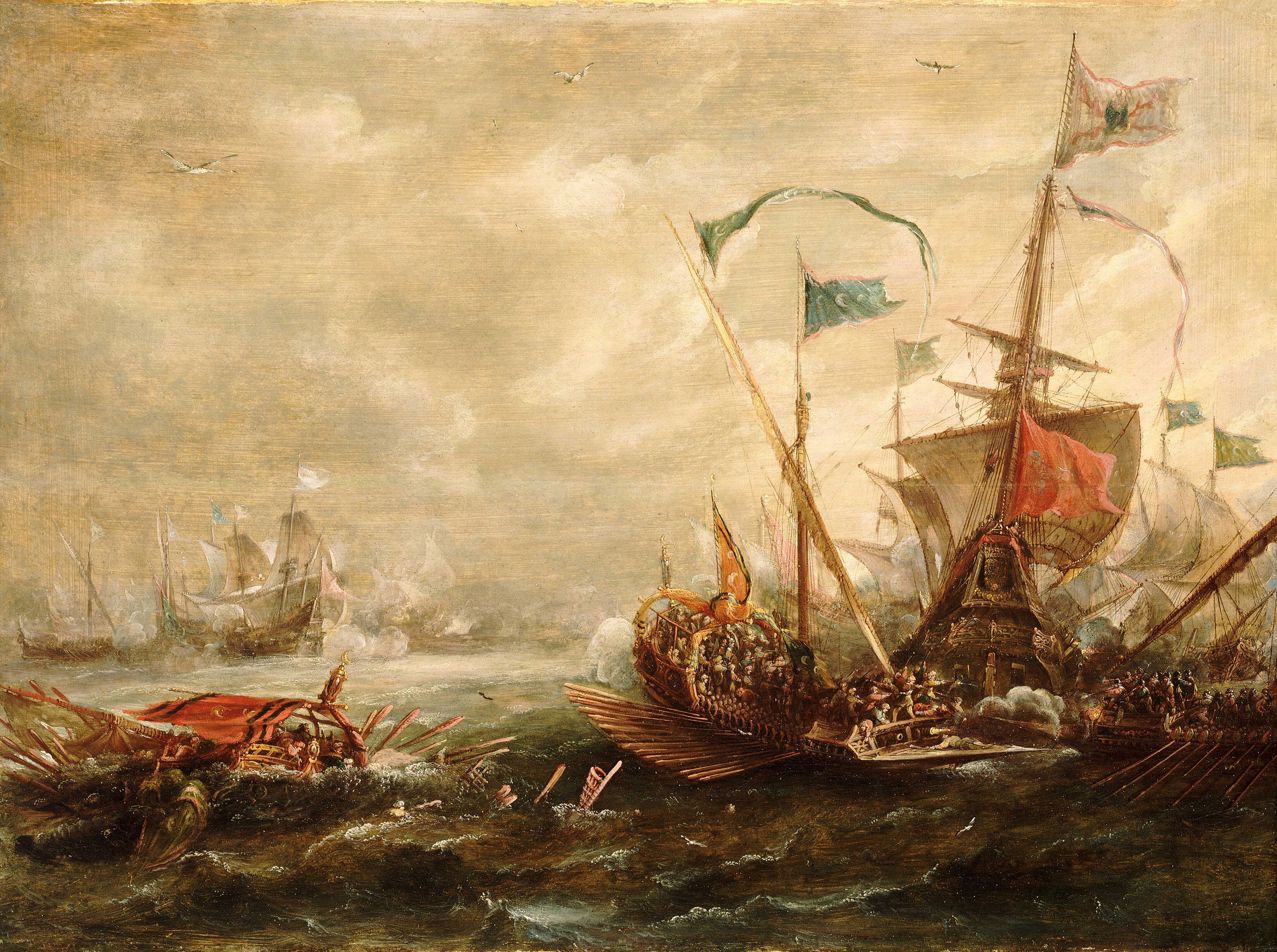
Spanish engagement with Barbary pirates by Andries van Eertvelt (1590–1652)

An English Ship in Action with Barbary Vessels by Willem van de Velde the Younger (1633–1707)

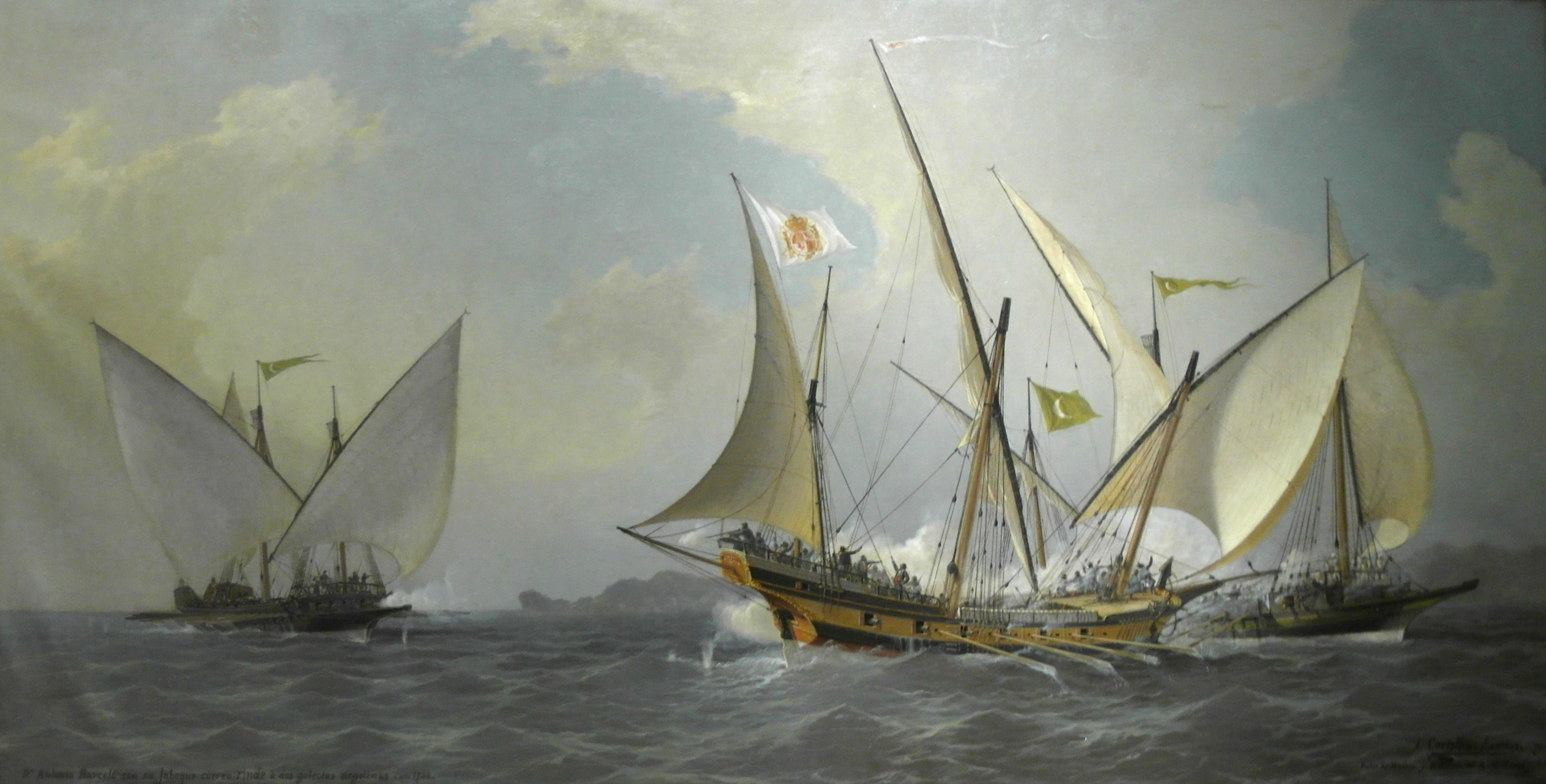
A Spanish xebec facing two Algerian corsair galiots by Ángel Cortellini y Sánchez

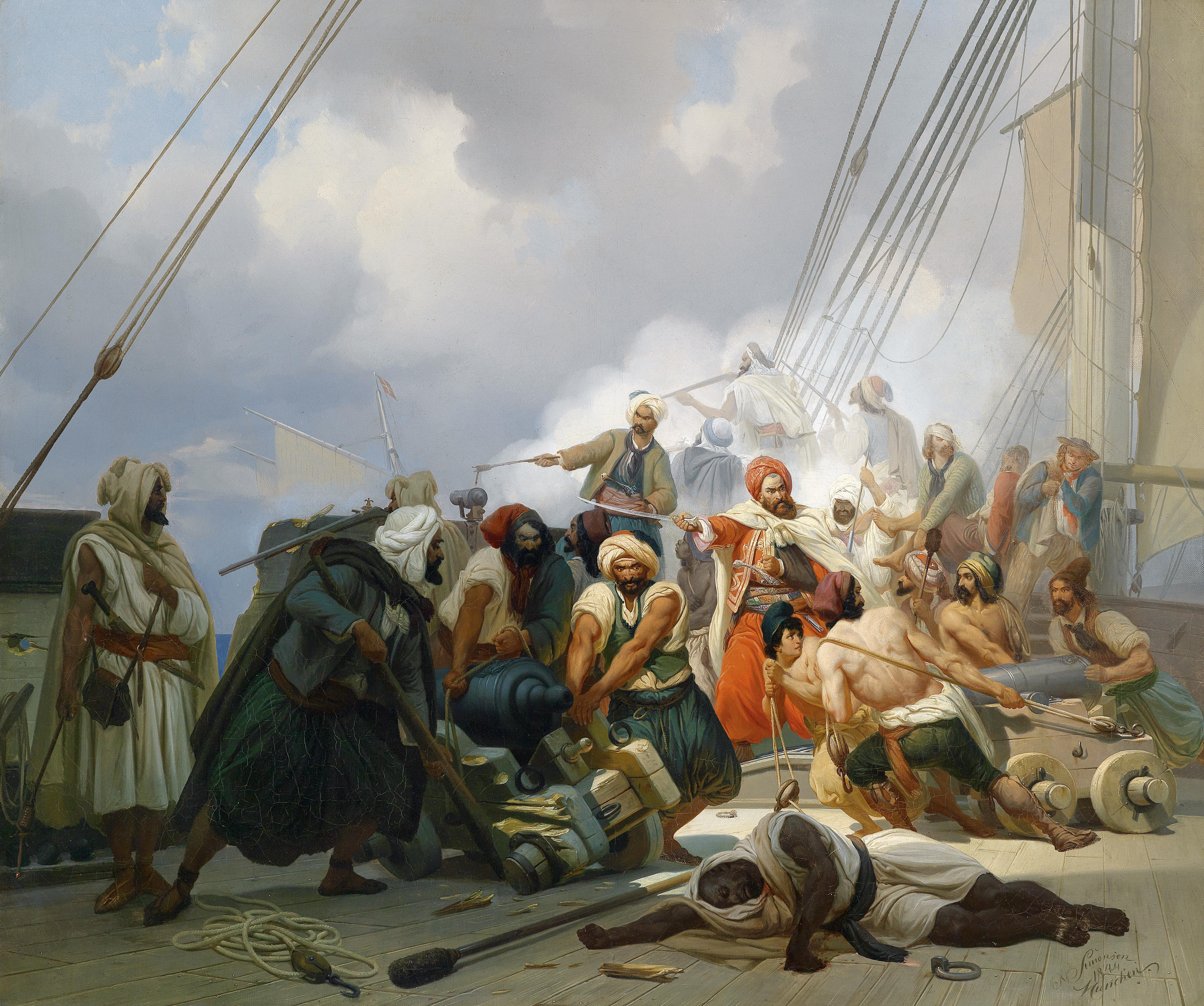
Barbary corsairs in action, by Niels Simonsen (1844)
