= Ali Bitchin Mosque =

Mosque in Algiers, Algeria

- مسجد علي بتشين
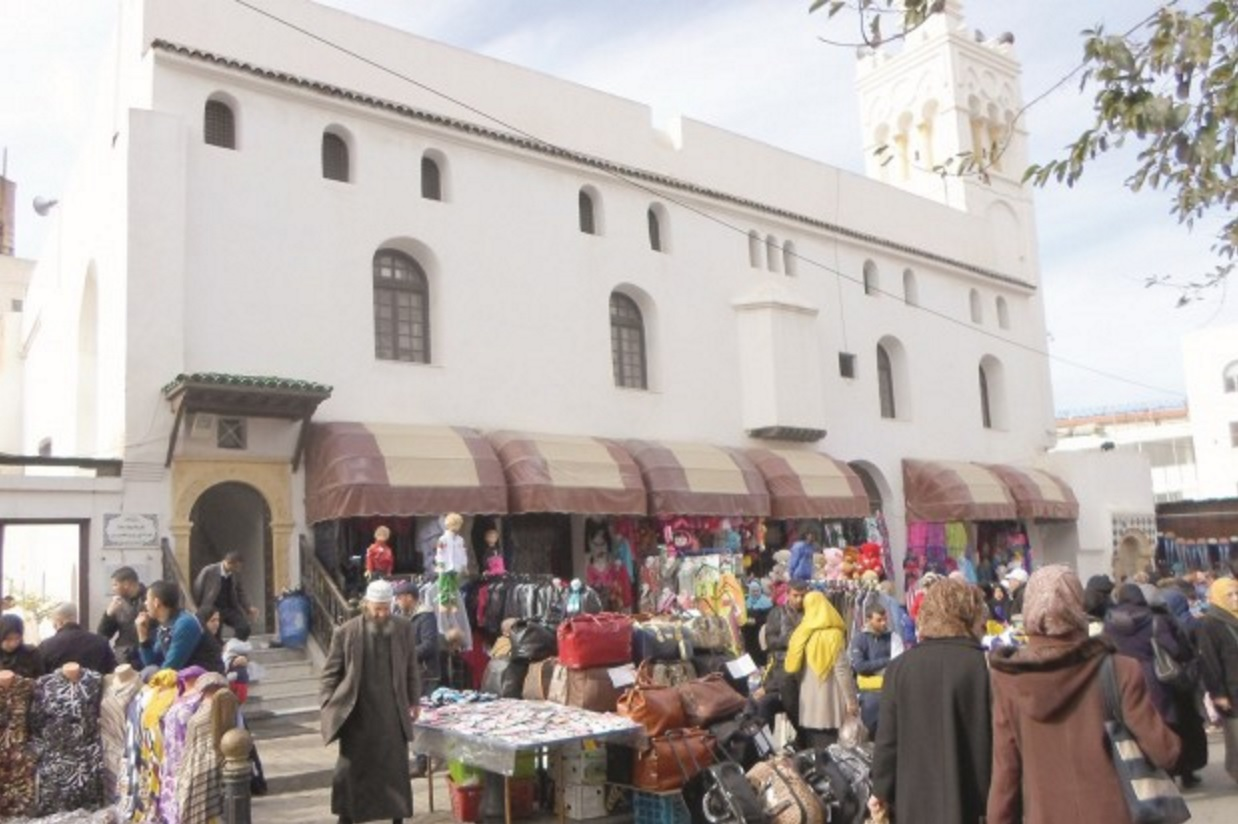

- Location of the mosque in Algiers

Religion
- Affiliation: Sunni Islam
- Ecclesiastical or organizational status: Mosque (1622–1830); Profane use (1830–1843); Church (1843–1962); Mosque (since 1962– )
- Status: Active

Location
- Location: Casbah, Algiers
- Country: Algeria
- Interactive map of Ali Bitchin Mosque
- Coordinates: 36°47′13″N 3°03′43″E

Architecture
- Type: Islamic architecture
- Style: Ottoman
- Founder: Ali Bitchin
- Completed: 1622 CE

Specifications
- Capacity: 800 worshippers
- Interior area: 500 m^{2} (5,400 sq ft)
- Minaret: 1
- Minaret height: 15 m (49 ft) (Note: Subsequently reduced to 12 m (39 ft).)

UNESCO World Heritage Site
- Part of: Casbah of Algiers
- Criteria: Cultural: (ii), (v)
- Reference: 565
- Inscription: 1992 (16th Session)

The Ali Bitchin Mosque (Arabic: مسجد علي بتشين) is a Sunni mosque in Algiers, Algeria. It's named after Ali Bitchin, who ordered its construction in 1622 CE. It is situated inside the Casbah of Algiers, a UNESCO World Heritage Site, located at the crosspoint between Bab El Oued and the lower area of the Casbah.

== History ==
Ali Bitchin ordered the construction of mosque in 1622, in the Ottoman style. A 15-metre-high (49 ft) minaret was completed in the Maghrebi style.

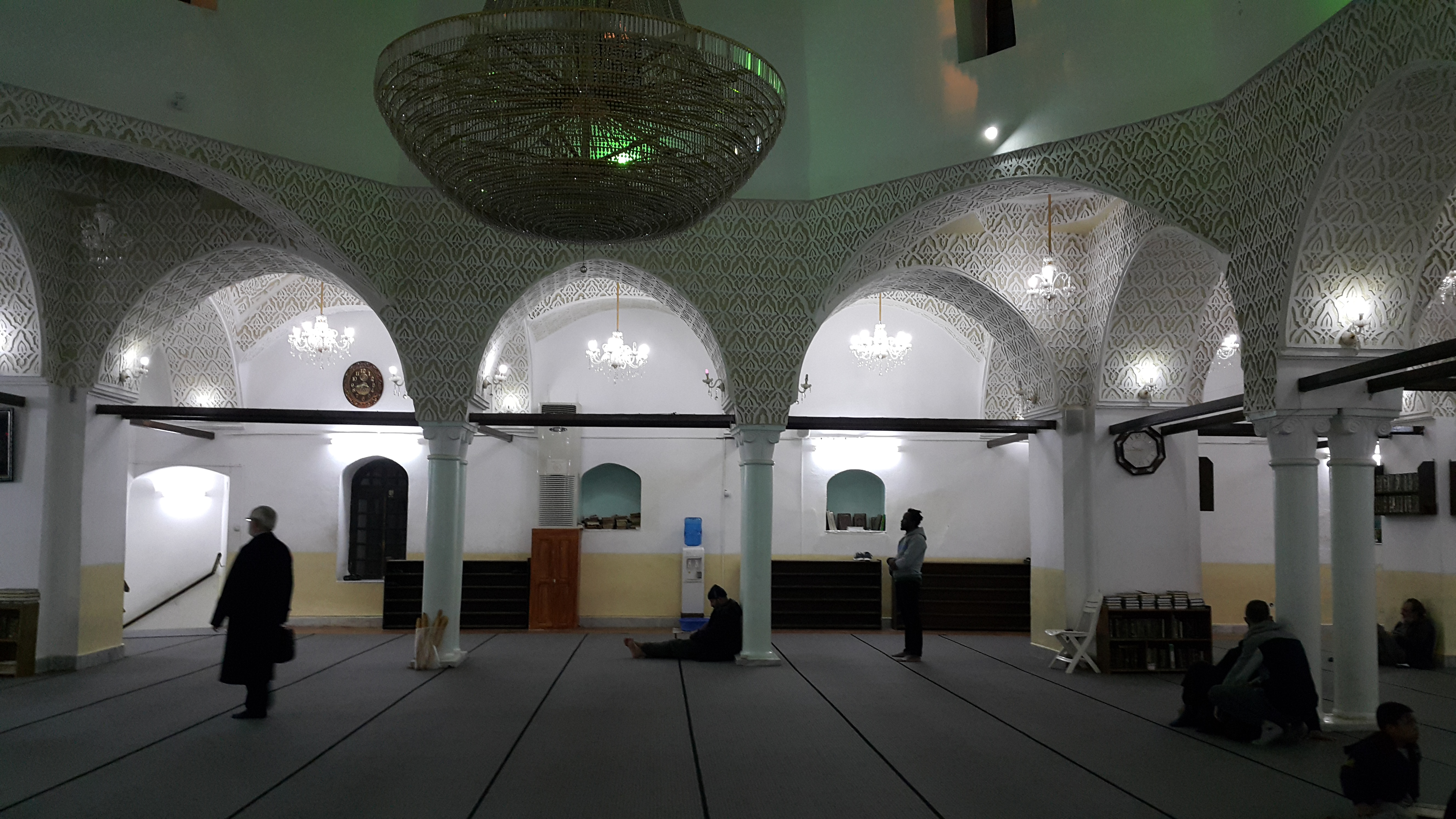
Interior of the mosque

The 500-square-metre (5,400 sq ft) mosque consisted of three floors, three rooms, ten shops, a bakery, a hamam, a mill and an inn. The inn was used by several high ranking politicians and religious leaders. Its hamam was especially popular and it remained active until two years after the French occupation begun. The mosque was located in the commercial area of the casbah, making many shops working around the mosque. In 1703, the mosque was briefly renamed to "Sidi al-Mahdi Mosque", reflecting the governor at the time.

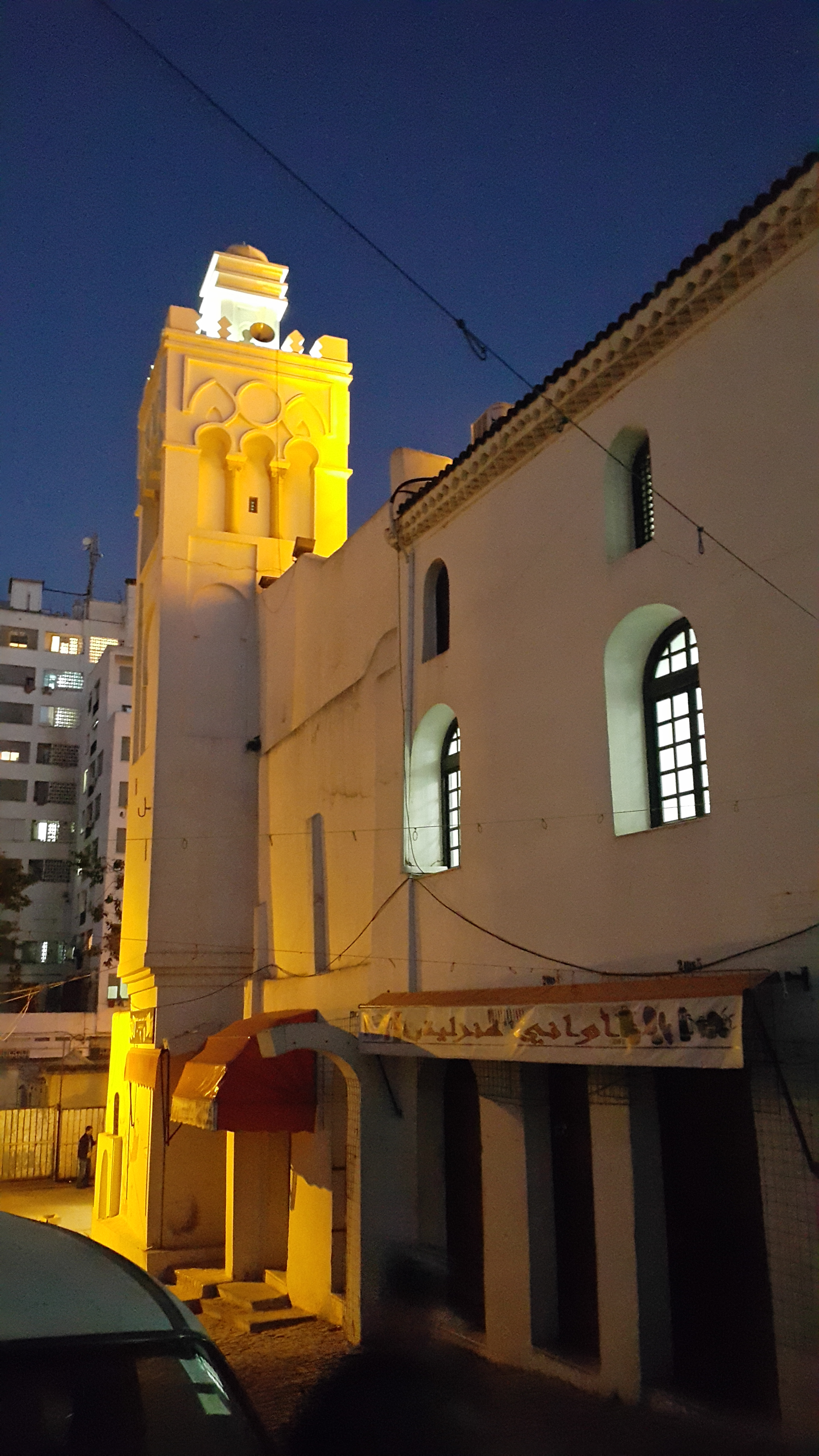
The new minaret by night in 2017

During the French occupation, height of the minaret was reduced to 12 metres (39 ft). The mosque was then converted to the military pharmacy center before turning into a church in 1843. After the conversion, some of the characters of the Islamic architectural style was lost. The French occupiers also took one of the doors of the Ketchaoua Mosque and used it as a decoration of the newly converted church. The mosque was among the 21 other mosques in the Casbah whose features were modified or transformed, for example by eliminating the wudu place and altering the mihrab. It was reconsecrated as a mosque after the independence of Algeria, with the Christian cross removed from the minaret.

The mosque could initially accommodate up to 500 worshipers; and after renovations in 2010, it can accommodate an additional 300 worshipers.

Mohamed Charef served as imam from 1908 until 2011.

== See also ==
- Islam in Algeria
- List of mosques in Algeria
