= Ali Bitchin =

Algerian corsair

Ali Bitchin (c. 1560 – 1645; sometimes spelt "Bitchnin") was a "renegade" (Christian converted to Islam) who made his fortune in Algiers through privateering. Bitchin was believed to be born with the family name of Piccini or Puccini or Piccinino in Venice. He was a Grand Admiral of Algiers and is known for the Ali Bitchin Mosque he built in the district of Zoudj-Aïoun in the old city (Casbah). He was the de facto governor of Regency of Algiers from 1621 to 1645.

Bitchin became particularly well known through the captivity narratives published by Emanuel D'Aranda, his slave for about a year from 1640 to 1641.

== Biography ==
Bitchin was part of a group of people captured in 1578, by Hassan Veneziano the Beylerbeys of Algiers at the time, while aboard a Venetian ship. Bitchin, only a ten-year-old boy at the time, was bought from the Babel Boustan slaves market (current fishery) for 60 golden dinars, by the Raïs Fettah-Allah Ben-Khodja, from whom he learned privateering.

With the exception of Raïs Hamidou who lived in the late 18th century, no pirate was as influential in North African history as Ali Bitchin. Under his command, the Algerian Navy assured her supremacy over the Mediterranean, blithely crossing the Straits of Gibraltar and pushing all the way to the Arctic Circle. Bitchin's privateers attacked Madeira, entered the Atlantic Ocean and even reached Ireland. They often attacked heavier vessels from their light boats regardless of the number of enemies. They resisted the most violent storms, appeared unexpectedly, and taunted their enemy with their wild audacity.

From the 1620s, he was the supreme head of the Ta'ifat al-Ra'is (guild of corsairs), and took on the title Captain of the Sea. He managed to maintain an equilibrium of stability between the interests of the corsairs, the janissary corps and the merchant class who invested money in the raids. Under his command, his fleet took the ships of nearly every European nation, he raided coastal settlements across the Mediterranean and from the Atlantic to the Albanian coast. He was also responsible for losses from English shipping in 1639 that exceeded the total losses from 1629 to 1638 combined.

By the late 1630s and early 1640s his reputation began to wane, especially in the Battle of Valona in 1638, where his combined Algerian and Tunisian fleet was decimated, losing 16 galleys and about 100 slaves. Senior leaders blamed him and he was sentenced to death but was quickly pardoned. He was also sidelined by the Ottoman court under Ibrahim I when he refused to partake in the Ottoman war against the Venetians.

== Ali Bitchin Mosque ==
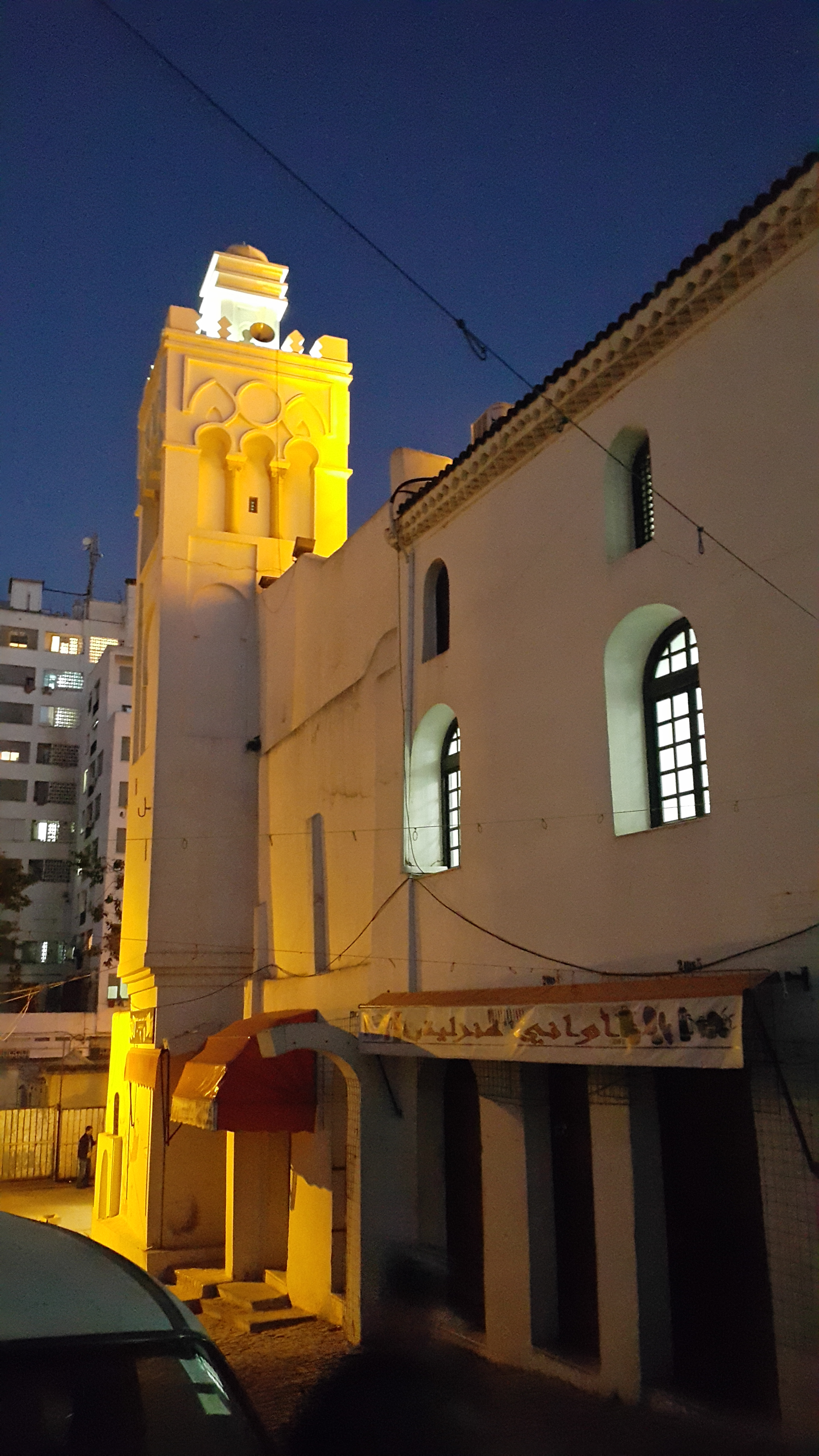
Ali Bitchin Mosque

Tradition says that when Ali Bitchin saw Princess Lalla Lallahoum, the daughter of Ben Ali, Sultan of the Kabyle people of Algiers, for the first time, he could not resist the desire to love her; she was considered the most beautiful woman of all. All his senses were troubled, and his days restless. Accompanied by Lalla N'fiça, widow of his mentor, Raïs Fethullah Ben-Khodja, Bitchin went to Ben Ali seeking the hand of his daughter.

Bitchin placed at the foot of the beautiful princess carpets of Persia, silks and brocades of the Levant, diamonds from India, Peru's gold and much more. Lalla Lallahoum regarded with indifference these riches: "No, she said, I have nothing to do of all this, I demand that my suitor build a mosque to prove his faith". Ali Bitchin Mosque was built that same year, in 1622.

== Death and legacy ==
Towards 1639, the Algerian navy, under the command of Ali Bitchin, suffered extensive damage alongside the Ottoman fleet against the Venetians in Aulona (modern-day Vlorë, Albania) on the Adriatic Sea. The Turkish Sultan accordingly promised compensations to the King of Algiers, but never sent the promised subsidies for the reconstruction of the Algerian fleet.

Raising the legitimate anger of the Raïs, Bitchin made the decision not to aid the Turkish Navy in the future. During 1645, Sultan Ibrahim summoned all the Algerian warships to fight the Knights of Malta and the Venetians but Bitchin and his pirates refused to attend. The perceived disobedience was interpreted by Ibrahim as an act of high treason and so Ibrahim secretly gave orders to poison Bitchin. According to public opinion, it was his servant, paid with gold, who plotted and carried out the assassination of Bitchin, by poisoning his coffee.

Bitchin was buried in Djebanet El Bashawet (cemetery of the Pashas) in the Bab El Oued neighborhood, and was unearthed with many others in 1831. In fact the French invaders later in 1832 transformed his Mosque into a Roman Catholic church calling it Notre Dame des Victoires, as they did the Ketchaoua Mosque of the lesser Casbah. In doing this, they profaned the Djebanet El Bashawet. New buildings were built upon the graves.

Anne Jean Marie René Savary donated the cemetery lands to several officers who divided them into parcels. Without qualms, they unearthed the bones that were shipped to Marseille. As evidenced by the letter Ibrahim Pasha wrote to the King of France on 2 February 1831: "The greatest pain that was made to our hearts is to destroy our cemeteries and to expose the desecrated remains of our ancestors.... Such injustice is painful to bear. This is contrary to all religions.... "

Dr. Segaud wrote in an article published in the Semaphore of Marseille, bearing date of 2 March 1832: "I saw The Josephine ship that arrived in Algiers loaded with bones, and human skulls, and of corpses recently unearthed."
