= Emmanuel de Aranda =

Flemish writer (1614–1686)

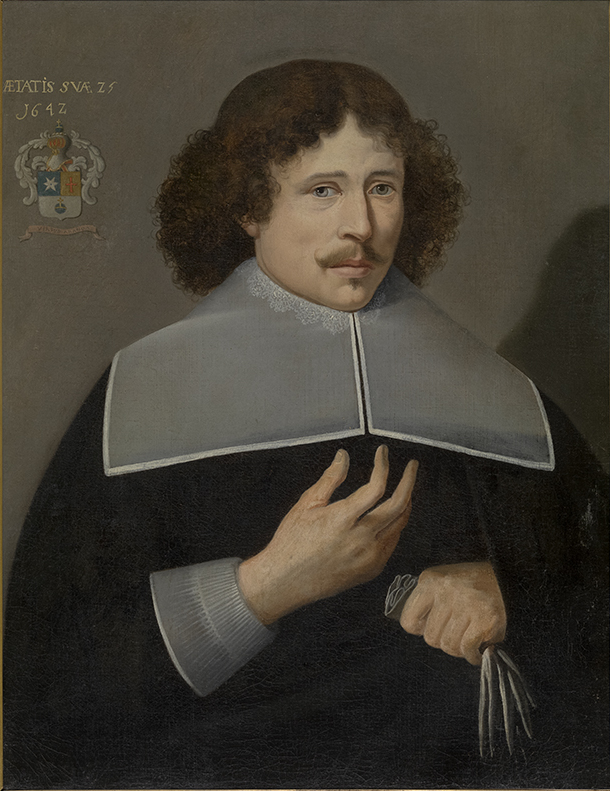
- Portrait of Emmanuel de Aranda (1642), in the Groeningemuseum
- Born: c. 1614; Bruges, County of Flanders, Spanish Netherlands
- Died: c. 1686
- Occupation: lawyer (judge advocate)
- Known for: Barbary slave trade slave narrative
- Notable work: Relation de la captivité et liberté du sieur Emanuel de Aranda, mené esclave à Alger en l'an 1640, et mis en liberté l'an 1642

Emmanuel de Aranda or Emanuel d'Aranda (1612x14–c. 1686) was a traveller and historian from the Spanish Netherlands. In 1640–1642 he spent more than a year as a captive in North Africa, later writing a well-known slave narrative about the experience.

== Biography ==
=== Early life and education ===
Aranda was a descendant of a family that came from Valladolid in Spain and had settled in Bruges for several generations. They were mainly active in the textile trade and were of distinguished rank in Spain. Emmanuel's father, Don Francisco, was a consul for the Spanish merchants in Bruges. His mother was Anne Van Severen. His oldest brother, Franciscus, married Isabelle Cloribus, had moved to Bruges and became the mayor.

After graduating licentiate of laws from the University of Leuven, Aranda was ready to step into the family business. In preparation, he made a trip to Spain, to see the country and learn the language. He left in 1639 and was joined by Renier Saldens (a doctor from Oostkamp), Jan Baptiste Van Caloen (a young man from Bruges), and the knight Philips de Cerf (or Ducherf), lord of Hondschoote and Leystrate, who later became mayor of Veurne.

=== Enslavement ===
In 1640, the group set off to return to the County of Flanders. They travelled overland to San Sebastián and took passage on an English merchant ship that was captured off the coast of Brittany on 22 August by Barbary pirates under the command of an English turncoat. One day earlier, the English merchantman had been chased by a suspicious caravel, but the naive captain had not taken evasive action. The caravel was joined by two larger ships, which hoisted the silver green flag of Algeria. The crew of the merchant ship were captured without a fight and taken to a nearby port.

Aranda and his companions were taken to Algeria and sold as slaves. He was a captive for almost a year and a half before his exchange was negotiated and he was able to return to Flanders.

In Algeria captives were led to the palace of the Pasha, who was entitled to claim one out of every eight prisoners brought in. Aranda and his other companions were sold at the slave market (also known as zoco or bedesten). Grand Admiral Ali Pegelin paid 200 pieces of eight for Aranda.

Aranda, unused to physical labour, was put to work treading grain, which he was unable to do to his overseer's satisfaction. He then became a construction worker at Pegelin's country house, and later a house servant.

=== Release and return ===
Negotiations for ransom were complicated because the prisoners had given false names and wanted to avoid the impression that their families were wealthy. Finally, Aranda and Caldoen were exchanged for five Muslims who were being held in Dunkirk. Caldoen was released to fetch them and brought them to Ceuta, where the exchange took place. On 24 March 1642, Aranda made the crossing to Gibraltar from where he travelled by land to Rouen. There, he embarked to Dover, from there to Dunkirk, reaching his native city on 20 August 1642.

Thanks to Francisco de Valcárcel y Velásquez, Aranda gained appointment as judge advocate for military justice in the Franc of Bruges. On 26 December 1644 he married the 18-year-old Catharina van Hauweghem in Saint Michael's Church, Ghent. They had fourteen children.

== Writings ==
Aranda's account of his experiences in the bagnio became a popular text in the late-17th century. The first edition was published in Brussels in 1656 by Jan Mommaert the Younger. The book was in three parts: a brief account of his enslavement and his months in captivity, a short history of Algiers, and a number of moralising anecdotes based on stories that he heard from and about other slaves. There were a total of at least eight editions up to 1682, in French, Dutch, Latin and English, printed variously in Brussels, Paris, The Hague, and London. He went on to write other collections of moralising anecdotes, which had much less success.

=== Bibliography ===
- Relation de la captivité et liberté du sieur Emanuel de Aranda, mené esclave à Alger en l'an 1640, et mis en liberté l'an 1642, Brussels, 1656
  - Relation de la Captivité du Sieur Emanuel d'Aranda, Paris, 1657
  - Relation de la captivité et liberté du sieur Emanuel d'Aranda, jadis esclave à Alger, Brussels, 1662
  - Turckse slavernie, Beschreven door Emanuel De Airanda, Soo hy selfs die geleden heeft, The Hague, 1666
  - The History of Algiers and It's Slavery: With Many Remarkable Particularities of Africk, translated by John Davies, London, 1666
  - Turcksche slavernij ende bekomen vrijheyt, Bruges, 1682
- Diverses histoires morales et divertissantes du Sr. Emanuel D'aranda, Leiden, 1671
- Den lacchende ende leerende waer-seggher, Brussels, Joan de Grieck, 1679

== Modern edition ==
- Latifa Z'rari, Emanuel d'Aranda. Les captifs d'Alger, Paris, J-P. Rocher, 1997
