= Raid on the Bay of Naples (1544) =

1544 Algerian capture of Bay of Naples

- Part of Spanish–Ottoman wars
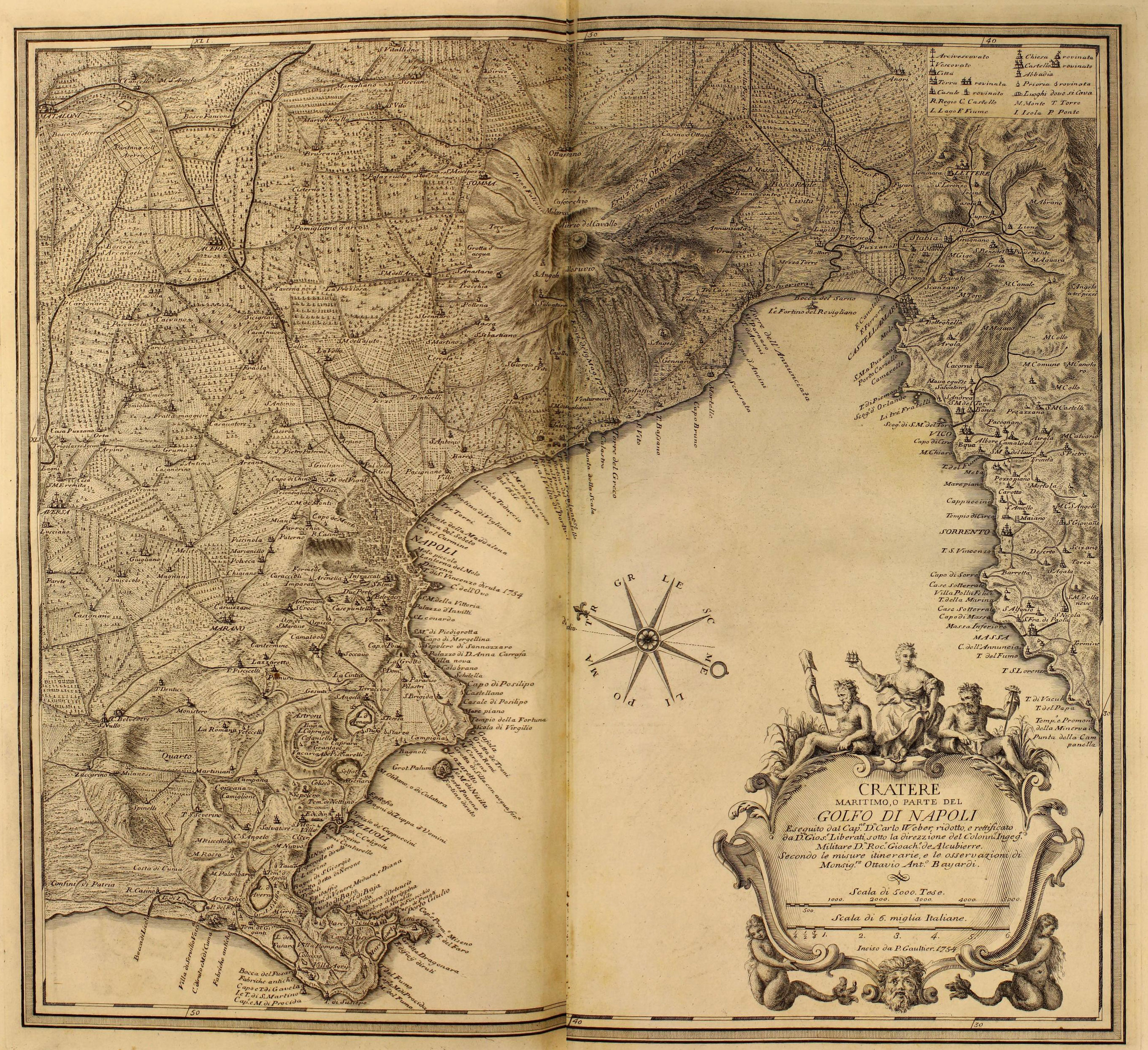
- Map of the Bay of Naples
Date	1544
Location	Naples, Kingdom of Naples
Result	Algerian victory

Belligerents
Kingdom of Naples	Regency of Algiers

Strength
Unknown	Unknown

Casualties and losses
7,000 enslaved	Unknown

The raid on the Bay of Naples occurred in 1544 when Algerians captured the Bay of Naples and enslaved 7,000 Neapolitans.

In 1544, Algerian corsairs sailed into the Bay of Naples and raided it. They then took an estimated 7,000 Neapolitan slaves.

The number of slaves taken by the Algerians drove the price of slaves so low that it was said "you could swap a Christian for an onion". Moreover, it was said to be "raining Christians in Algiers".
