= Sack of Sori =

1584 battle in Sori, Italy

Date	1 July 1584
Location	Sori, Italy
Result	Algerian victory

Belligerents
Regency of Algiers	Republic of Genoa

Commanders and leaders
Unknown	(Republic of Genoa) Gian Andrea Doria

Strength
22 Galleys; 1,500 men	Unknown

Casualties and losses
4 killed	100 enslaved 1 Galley captured

The Sack of Sori was a conflict between the Republic of Genoa and the Regency of Algiers that occurred on July 1, 1584.

== Battle ==
On precisely July 1, 1584, twenty-two Algerian galleys containing 1,500 men orchestrated an assault on the town of Sori, situated along the Ligurian coast a mere eight miles from Genoa. They then pillaged the town, abducting 100 men and women as slaves, with a minimal loss of only 4 men during the confrontation. Compounding the devastation, the Algerians seized a Genoese ship while departing the waters near Sori.

== Aftermath ==
Promptly upon receiving this distressing information, both the galleys of the republic and those under the command of Gian Andrea Doria set sail from the port in pursuit of the corsairs. However, the pursuit was abandoned swiftly, given the unfavorable numerical odds and the considerable cargo, notably "four million in gold on board Doria's galleys" yet to be unloaded. Roccatagliata further notes that as Doria departed with his galleys at the conclusion of the summer, the Genoese populace harbored profound apprehension of potential corsair incursions. This fear was so pervasive that in the suburban environs surrounding the city, individuals would frequently engage in hasty retreats without apparent cause.
