= Battle of the Bay of Velez =

Naval battle between the forces of Salah Reis and a Portuguese flotilla

Date	1552 or 1553
Location	Peñón de Vélez de la Gomera, Spain
Result	Ottoman-Algerian victory

Belligerents
(Portugal) Portuguese Empire	Regency of Algiers

Commanders and leaders
Inácio Nunez Gato (POW)	Salah Reis

Strength
5 caravels 1 small ship 300 or 500 men	40 vessels

Casualties and losses
Unknown deaths, all captured	Unknown

The Battle of the Bay of Velez or the Battle of Velez was a naval battle between the forces of Salah Reis and a Portuguese flotilla in which the forces of Salah Reis emerged victorious, captured the Portuguese squadron and seized the Penon de Velez. The Portuguese fleet was commanded by Inácio Nunes Gato, who was also the official interpreter for John III.

== Background ==
The Wattasid ruler, Abu Hassan implored the Christians for help, he stayed in Lisbon for four months where he obtained support from John III of Portugal, they in turn wished to reinstate him as the ruler in Fez and receive Velez, Larache and Algiers. The Portuguese had formally offered him Arzila and likely intended to give him Tangier. He was to be transported to Velez by a fleet of 5 Portuguese caravels under the command of Inácio Nunez Gato, however bad weather delayed the journey. The Portuguese force had to stay in Tangier for nine days due to the weather, therefore when they arrived in Ceuta and then Velez the country was on high alert. When the Portuguese fleet arrived at Velez, Salah Raïs was warned of their arrival by a Sharifian caïd and immediately dispatched 24 galleys to the Velez.

The winter of 1552–1553 in the Regency of Algiers, was devoted to outfitting a fleet. In the beginning of June, Salah Reis embarked from Algiers and set out with a fleet of 40 vessels, galliots, galleys and brigantines. However, other sources note 1552 as the year of the battle.

== Battle ==
On July 5, 1553, while at sea with his squadron, Salah Reis came across and defeated a Portuguese fleet at the bay of Velez. At first he surrounded the Portuguese ships, after a cannonade on both sides and a continuous volley the Portuguese ships were boarded. The Portuguese bravely defended themselves for three hours before they were overwhelmed. Salah Rais and the Barbary corsairs scored a swift victory. The entire flotilla and its caravels were captured and the Portuguese and Moroccans including the commander, Inácio Nunes Gato and the Wattasid ruler, Abu Hassan were taken captive and brought to Velez. Abu Hasan was kept in Algiers in strict captivity for some months before offering his vassalage to Salah Reis.

== Aftermath ==
Abu Hassan attempted to negotiate the release of the Portuguese crew with Salah Rais, however he was unsuccessful. Salah Rais did not grant the release of Inácio Nunes Gato or the other Portuguese captives, however he did promise help in reconquering Fez.

The booty was offered to the Saadi ruler as a token of friendship and neighbourliness and also to dissuade him from launching raids on Oran. It was a man named Musa who commanded the Velez on behalf of the Saadi ruler, Salah Reis gifted him the navy vessels and cannons he had captured. Salah Reis informed him that Abu Hassan would be imprisoned in Algiers for his dealings with the Christians and requested that the Saadi ruler should not cross the Moulouya, which was the border between the Saadi state and the Kingdom of Tlemcen. Despite this offer a new border incident occurred, and Salah Reis spent his winter preparing an expedition against Morocco, after which he defeated the Saadi ruler in the Battle of Taza.
