= Battle of Taza (1553) =

- Part of the Conflicts between the Regency of Algiers and Morocco
Date	December 1553
Location	Taza, Morocco
Result	Algerian victory
Territorial changes	Taza is captured and garrisoned

Belligerents
Regency of Algiers	Saadi Sultanate

Commanders and leaders
Salah Rais	Mohammed al-Shaykh

Strength
1,500 men	30,000 cavalry 10,000 infantry 20 cannons

Casualties and losses
Unknown	Unknown

The Battle of Taza occurred in December 1553, it was a battle between the Regency of Algiers and the Saadi Sultanate. Salah Reis left 1,500 men in charge of the victorious operation against the Moroccan camp near Taza, which was protected by a Moroccan army composed of 30,000 cavalry, 10,000 infantry and 20 cannons.

== Background ==
The Wattasid Abou Hassan had implored the Christians for help in reconquering his state. He was able to obtain support in Lisbon from John III of Portugal, they demanded in return the cessation of Velez, Larache and Algiers. A fleet of 5 Portuguese caravels transporting him was intercepted and defeated by Salah Reis in the Battle of Velez. The Velez was captured by Salah Reis.

Abou Hassan sought intervention against the Sharif in Fez, having been captured by Salah Reis and held in strict captivity in Algiers prior to offering his vassalage to Salah Reis. Consequently, Algerine guns were brought into Velez.

Abou Hassan was supported by the Qadariyya Sufi order while his enemy, the Saadians, were supported by the Shadhiliyya Sufi order. The Jazoulite Sufi brotherhoods and the followers of Sidi Ahmed Ben Youssef, repressed by the Saadian ruler, were ready to support Abou Hassan.

== Battle ==
Salah Reis dispatched 22 small sailing ships and had them anchored by Melilla. This strategic tactic was intended to provide an easy escape in the event of failure. A military engagement occurred close to where the fleet had landed, near the Penon De Velez, the Saadian forces of Mohammed al-Shaykh were defeated allowing an advance into the interior by the forces of Salah Reis.

In 1553 Salah Reis departed with 600 musketeers, 1,000 spahis and 4,000 horsemen from the Kingdom of Kuku. Salah Reis set out with his army in September and brought the Wattasid sovereign with him. When Salah Reis stopped at Tlemcen, Mohammed ash-Sheikh set up his headquarters at Taza with 30,000 cavalry, 10,000 infantry and 20 cannons.

Salah Reis crossed the border and arrived in sight of the Moroccan camp in December. He conducted a night attack against the Moroccan camp. The 1,500 men in the attacking column routed the Arabs who were frightened of the detonations. The Turko-Algerine move was swift and efficient. Mohammed al-Shaykh failed to foil Salah Reis on the banks of the Inaouen River and his forces broke under fire on the Sebou River. Salah Reis was able to defeat the Moroccans in the first confrontation at Taza.

== Aftermath ==
The Sharif retreated to a height behind Taza and then retired to Fez in mid December. Salah Reis received a reinforcement of 600 men from the Wattasid sovereign and went with all of his forces to the Oued Sebou, six kilometres from Fez. The inhabitants on the banks of the Sebou River, members of the Qadiriyya Order, welcomed them. Salah Rais stationed a garrison of 200 Turks under the command of Abu Hassan in Taza. Another battle against the Moroccans took place at Qudyat-al-Mahali in the suburbs of Fez in January and Salah Reis was victorious.
