= Bombardment of Algiers (1688) =

1688 bombardment

- Part of Franco–Algerian war (1681–1688)
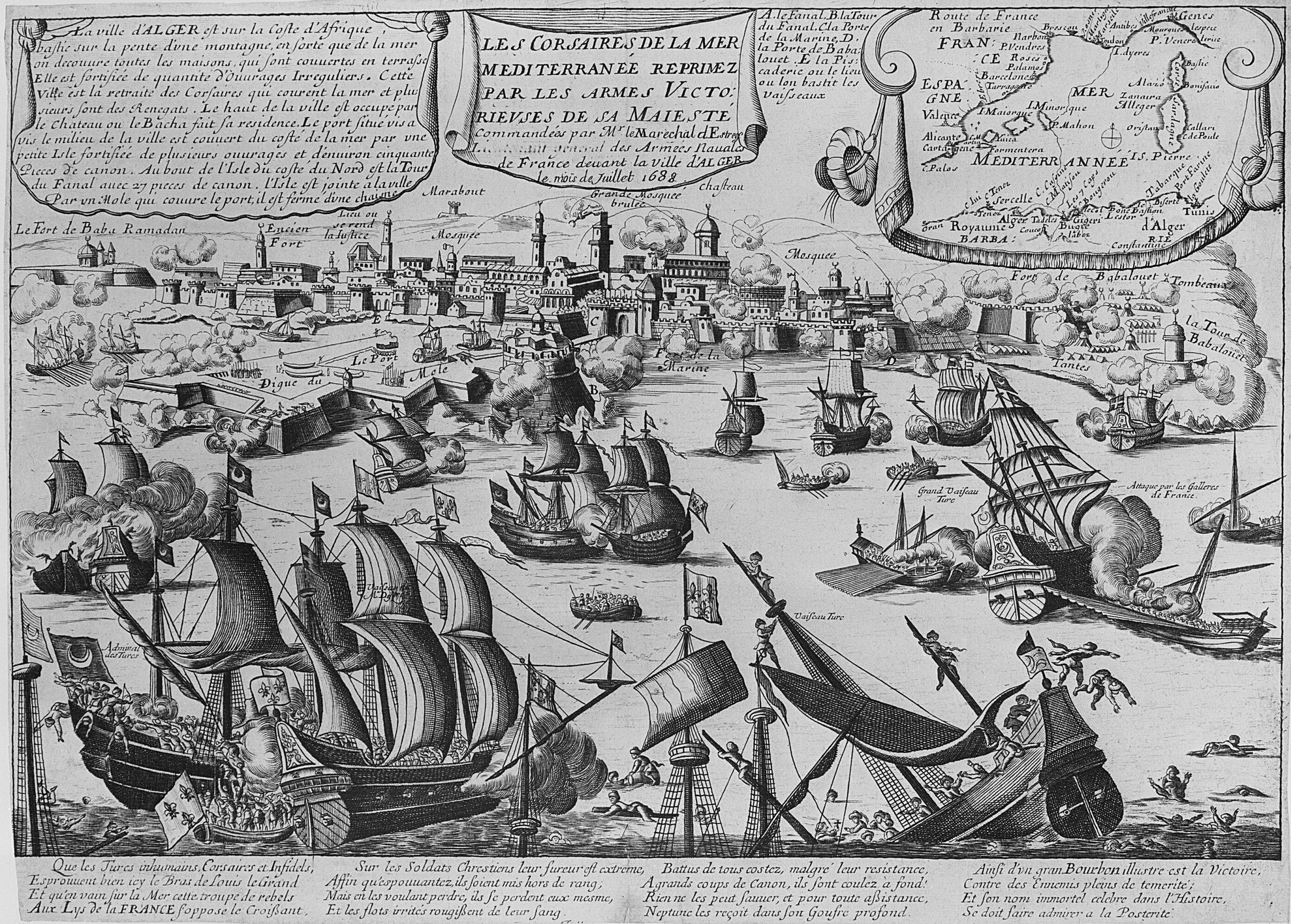
- The bombardment of Algiers, 1688
Date	June–July 1688
Location	Algiers
Result	Algerian victory

Belligerents
France	Algiers

Commanders and leaders
Jean II d'Estrées	Mezzo Morto Hüseyin Pasha

Units involved
31 warships 10 bomb galiots	Unknown

The bombardment of Algiers in 1688 was a military expedition ordered by Louis XIV against the Regency of Algiers in order to enforce the peace treaty of 1683 which had been violated by Algerian pirates. The squadron, comprising 31 ships and 10 bomb galiots, was commanded by Jean II d'Estrées.

D'Estrées' squadron arrived at Algiers on 26 June. It succeeded in inflicting serious damage on the city, but its artillery defences had been strengthened since the previous French expeditions in 1682 and 1683. As a result, the French fleet lost several ships and was obliged to retire after 16 days, without being able to enforce the peace treaty.

== Aftermath ==
The power of the Dey of Algiers, Mezzo Morto Hüseyin Pasha was destabilised by the French assault, and in the end he fled the city in the face of public discontent. His successor Hadj Chabane appointed an ambassador to Versailles, Mohamed el Amin, to negotiate a lasting peace, which was concluded in 1690.
