= Battle of Zeytinburnu =

- Part of the Morean War
Date	18 September 1695
Location	Lesbos, Aegean Sea
Result	Ottoman victory

Belligerents
Ottoman Empire	Republic of Venice

Commanders and leaders
Mezzomorto; Abdülkadir Pasha	Girolamo Michele †; Giovanni Zeno †

Strength
33 galleon	33 galleon 6 barge

Casualties and losses
300 killed and wounded	5,000 killed and wounded

The Battle of Zeytinburnu was a naval battle in September 1695 in which the Ottoman fleet under the command of Mezzomorto inflicted a heavy defeat on the fleet of the Republic of Venice off the coast of Lesbos.

== Background ==
Mezzomorto was appointed as Kapudan Pasha with the rank of Vizier on May 6, 1695, after defeating the Venetian fleet in the Oinousses Islands in February 1695 and succeeding in liberating Chios from Venetian occupation. Then, he was asked to assist the expedition planned by the commander-in-chief Mısırlızade İbrahim Pasha from the sea to retake the Morea, which was also under Venetian occupation.

On 18 June 1695, the Ottoman fleet] which set out from Istanbul to the Aegean Sea, was joined by the ships of the Barbary states (Regency of Algiers, Tunis and Tripolitania) in the port of Foça. Afterwards, the galleys that brought the Egyptian soldiers from Rhodes also joined the fleet.

Upon learning that the 73-ship Venetian fleet, consisting of 34 galleys, 6 barges and 33 galleons, was near the island of Andros, Mezzomorto also advanced with the fleet to the vicinity of Psara. After the Venetian fleet arrived near Samos, the Ottoman fleet headed back to the Anatolian coast on September 12, and on September 15, the two fleets met south of Chios. After mutual cannon fire, the Ottoman fleet, which was able to withdraw from the Chios Channel to Lesbos, anchored at Karaburun. While the parties did not lose any ships in this conflict, the Venetian fleet lost 39 dead and 88 wounded.

== Battle ==
Mezzomorto decided to attack the Venetians and came to the coast of Lesbos with 33 galleons. He sent 4 galleons against the galley fleet of the Venetians. He divided the others into three under the Kapitana, Patrona, and Riyale flagships and advanced against the Venetians. The Venetian fleet initially avoided communication and withdrew to the coast of Zeytinburnu near the Gulf of Gera on Lesbos. Despite this, the two fleets met on September 18.

Although the Venetian fleet showed strong resistance at the beginning of the battle, the sinking of the flagship galleon Battista Piccolo with 231 crew and soldiers after being hit by its ammunition at around 5:00 pm changed the course of the battle. Taking advantage of the chaos that emerged in the Venetian fleet when the fire on the sunken ship spread to the Redentore galleon and was out of the fight, Mezzomorto increased the intensity of his attack. While 10 galleys of the Venetian fleet were severely damaged and were out of action, 3 of its ships (1 galleon and a galley) were captured by the Algerian and Tripolitanian fleets fighting in the Ottoman fleet (these ships were later brought to Istanbul). The Venetian fleet suffered 5,000 casualties, including Second Admiral Girolamo Michele and former Admiral Giovanni Zeno.

While the Venetian fleet was retreating from Lesbos to Bademli on the Anatolian coast, three of its damaged galleys sank and some were scattered in the storm that broke out on 19–20 September.

== Aftermath ==
The Venetian fleet tried to gather in Agios Efstratios and Skyros. Contarini was also able to reach Skyros on September 27. The Venetian fleet, which left here on September 28, gathered in its main base in the Morea, Nafplion, between October 1 and 4.

The Ottoman fleet returned to Istanbul, while Mezzomorto stayed in the Dardanelles Strait with the galleys for a while, then reached the capital on October 22 and was congratulated by the Sultan Mustafa II.
