= Bartolomeo Contarini =

Bartolomeo Contarini may refer to:

- Bartolomeo Contarini (nobleman), 15th-century Venetian businessman and nobleman
- Bartolomeo Contarini (naval commander), 17th-century commander of the Venetian and Papal fleets at the Battle of Andros in the Great Turkish War
