= Bombardment of Algiers (1683) =

1683 bombardment

Bombardment of Algiers, 1683
- Part of Franco–Algerian war (1681–1688)
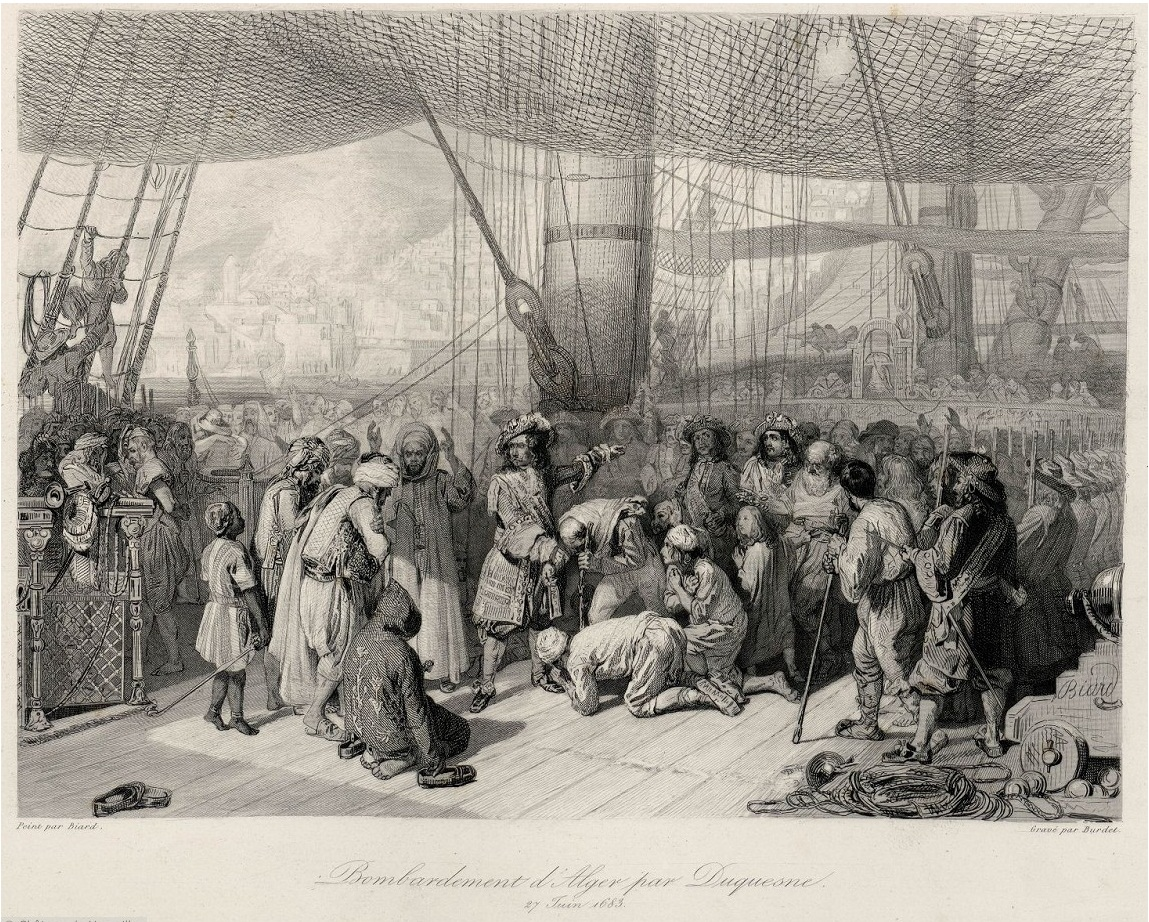
- Augustin Burdet, Duquesne liberating the captives after the bombardment of Algiers in 1683, engraving after François-Auguste Biard.
Date	June–July 1683
Location	Algiers
Result	Inconclusive

Belligerents
France	Regency of Algiers

Commanders and leaders
Abraham Duquesne	Baba Hassan; Mezzo Morto

Units involved
17 ships of the line 3 frigates 16 galleys 7 bomb galiots 48 longboats 18 fluyts 8 tartanes	Unknown

The bombardment of Algiers in 1683 was a French naval operation against the Regency of Algiers during the Franco–Algerian war (1681–1688). It led to the rescue of more than 100 French prisoners, in some cases after decades of captivity, but the great majority of Christian captives in Algiers were not liberated.

== Background ==
The previous year, Louis XIV had ordered Duquesne to bombard Algiers after the Dey declared war on France. At the head of a forty-strong fleet, Duquesne sailed to Algiers in July 1682, but bad weather delayed his attack. After several bombardments in August, the city suffered serious damage, but bad weather prevented the signing of a conclusive peace agreement, forcing Duquesne to return to France.

In the Spring of 1683, Duquesne set to sea once again with a fleet of 17 ships of the line, 3 frigates, 16 galleys, 7 bomb galiots, 48 longboats, 18 fluyts and 8 tartanes. This was a larger force than had been sent to Algiers the previous year. As well as being more numerous, the galiots were better equipped and manned by a special corps of bombardiers. The fleet set sail from Toulon on 23 May.

== Second bombardment of Algiers ==
The bombardment began on the night of 26–27 June, and two hundred and twenty two bombs, launched in less than twenty four hours, started fires in Algiers and prompted general disorder as well as killing around 300 Algerians. Hassan Dey intended to resist nonetheless, but the population urged him to sue for peace. Duquesne agreed to a truce on condition that all Christian slaves were delivered to him. When the truce expired, Hassan Dey asked for, and received, an extension. Duquesne meanwhile set out his terms for agreeing a peace:

- freeing all Christian slaves
- an indemnity equal to the value of all the goods seized from France by pirates
- a solemn embassy to be sent to Louis XIV to ask his forgiveness for the hostile acts committed against his navy.

These terms resolved the Dey to continue resistance.

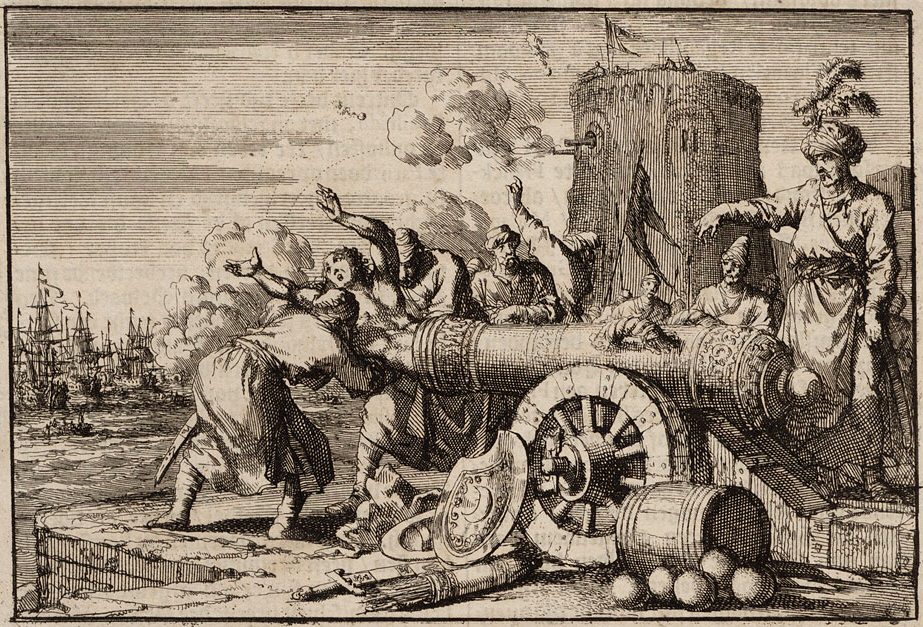
Dutch engraving showing the death of Consul le Vacher, 1698

Despite the fierce resistance of the Algerians, the city was engulfed by an enormous fire which consumed palaces, mosques, and many other buildings across the city; the wounded could not find any refuge; and ammunition ran low. Algiers would have been reduced to ruins had not Duquesne himself run out of missiles. The bombardment ended on 29 July.

Louis XIV was frustrated by his failure to either destroy Algiers or force the Algerians to make peace on his terms.

One of the Algerian commanders, Mezzo Morto Hüseyin Pasha, then seized command and denounced the cowardice of the Dey, who had agreed to treat with the French. He had him put to death and was acclaimed as his successor by the janissaries. Before long a red flag, raised from the heights of the Casbah, announced to Duquesne that combat was resumed. The Algerians replied to the bombs hurled at their city by tying the French consul, Jean Le Vacher to the mouth of a cannon. On 28 July pieces of his shattered limbs fell on the decks of the French vessels, along with those of other French prisoners blown to pieces. Mezzo Morto opened fire on the French fleet, forcing it to withdraw.

== Aftermath ==
In 1684, Louis XIV sent an envoy, Tourville, to Algiers. A peace treaty that retained the provisions of earlier treaties was signed. Five years later, after Algiers violated the treaty, the French again bombarded the city. Admiral d'Estrées obliged the Dey to seek a new peace agreement, signed on 27 September 1688, which the Algerians respected. Thereafter the corsair captains, though they avoided the coasts of France, continued their raids elsewhere, causing considerable damage to the coastal regions of Spain.

== See also ==
- Bombardment of Algiers (1682)
- Bombardment of Algiers (1688)

== Bibliography ==
- Vergé-Franceschi, Michel (2002). Dictionnaire d'Histoire maritime (in French). Paris: éditions Robert Laffont. ISBN 2-221-08751-8.
- Meyer, Jean; Acerra, Martine (1994). Histoire de la marine française (in French). Rennes: éditions Ouest-France. ISBN 2-7373-1129-2.
- Monaque, Rémi (2016). Une histoire de la marine de guerre française (in French). Paris: éditions Perrin. ISBN 978-2-262-03715-4.
- Taillemite, Étienne (2002). Dictionnaire des marins français (in French). Paris: éditions Tallandier. ISBN 2-84734-008-4.
- Bély, Lucien (2015). Dictionnaire Louis XIV (in French). éditions Robert Laffont. ISBN 978-2-221-12482-6.
- Le Moing, Guy (2011). Les 600 plus grandes batailles navales de l'Histoire. Marines Éditions. ISBN 978-2-35743-077-8.
- Courtinat, Roland (2003). La piraterie barbaresque en Méditerranée: XVIe – XIXe siècle (in French). Serre Éditeur. p. 61.
- Peter, Jean (1997). Les barbaresques sous Louis XIV: le duel entre Alger et la Marine du Roi (1681-1698) (in French). Institut de stratégie comparée.
- John A. Lynn (2014). Les Guerres de Louis XIV. éditions Perrin. ISBN 978-2-262-04755-9.
- Henry Laurens, John Tolan, Gilles Veinstein, L’Europe et l’islam : quinze siècles d’histoire, Éditions Odile Jacob, 2009
- Sue, Eugène (1836). Histoire de la marine française: XVIIe siècle - Jean Bart (in French). F. Bonnaire. pp. 121–151.
- Pellissier de Reynaud (1844). Mémoires historiques et géographiques sur l'Algérie (in French). Paris: Imprimerie royale. p. 274 et suiv.
- Troude, Onésime (1867–1868). Batailles navales de la France (in French). Paris: Challamel aîné.
- Charles Bourel de La Roncière, Le Bombardement d'Alger en 1683, d'après une relation inédite, Imprimerie nationale, 1916, 55 pages (lire en ligne)
- La Roncière, Charles (1920). Histoire de la Marine française: La Guerre de Trente Ans, Colbert (in French). Paris: Plon.
