= Franco-Algerian war (1681–1688) =

War from 1681 to 1688

Franco–Algerian war (1681–1688)
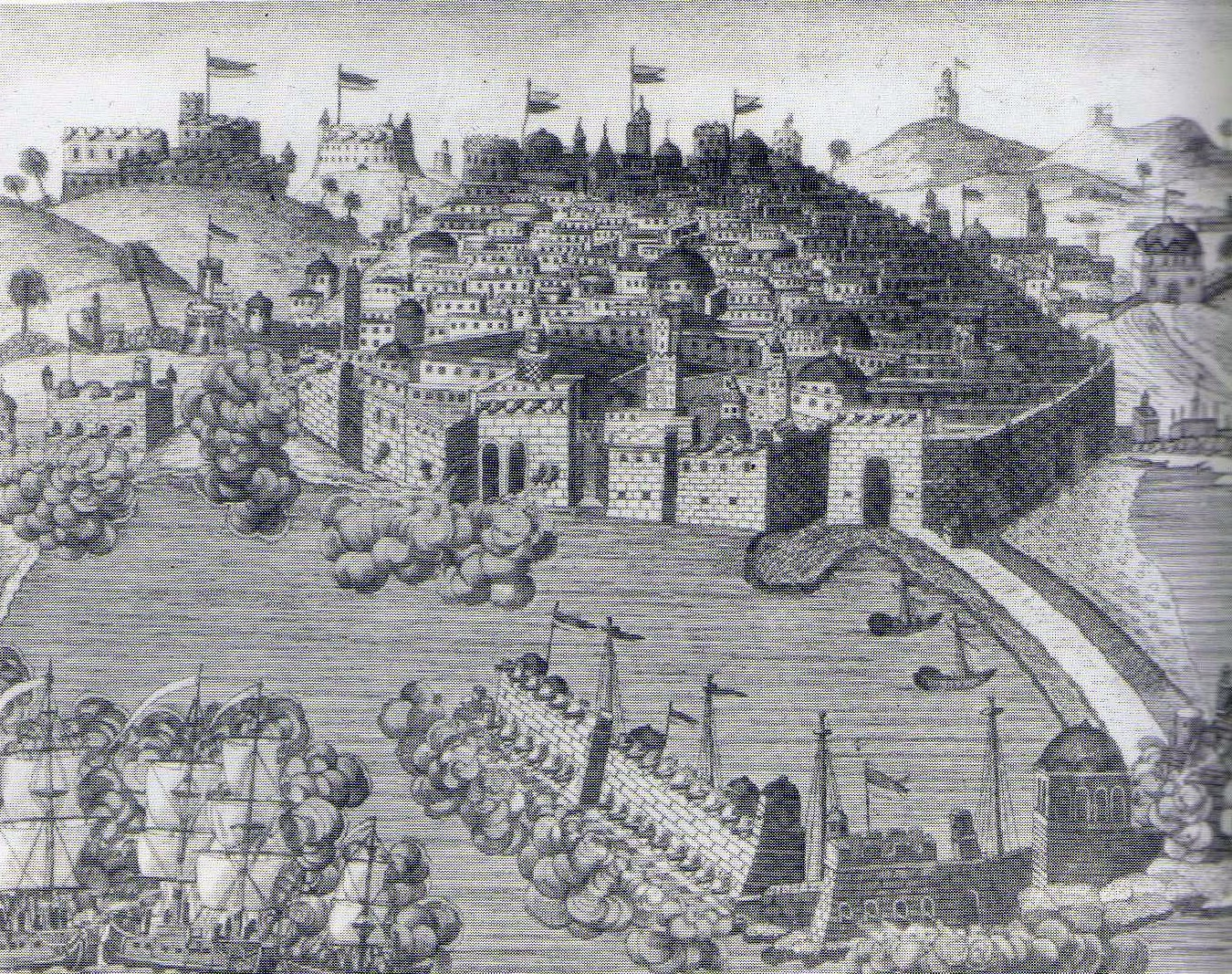
- Bombardment of Algiers by the fleet of Admiral Duquesne in 1682
Date	1681–1688
Location	Algiers, Mediterranean
Result	Algerian victory

Belligerents
France	Regency of Algiers

Commanders and leaders
Louis XIV; Abraham Duquesne; Jean II d'Estrées	Baba Hassan; Mezzo Morto

The Franco–Algerian war (1681–1688) was part of a wider campaign by France against the Barbary Pirates in the 1680s.

== Background ==
King Louis XIV sought to have the French flag respected in the Mediterranean, to preserve the economic advantages already obtained, and to play the role of "Most Christian King" (Rex Christianissimus) against Islamic powers, while seeing to the maintaining the French alliance with the Sublime Porte. France tried to settle the question of the Bastion, and the Spaniards of Oran tried to occupy Tlemcen and the English fleet threatened Algiers. But Algiers did not yield to these intimidations: any concession was refused to the French, the Spaniards were pushed pack to Oran in 1675, and the raïs dispersed the English ships which in 1678 threatened the city of Algiers.

In October 1680, Barbary pirates captured a number of French vessels, without declaration of war, and took the captains and crews to Algiers as slaves. On 18 October the Dey of Algiers, Baba-Hassan, officially declared war on Louis XIV and on 23 October, he announced the commencement to hostilities to the French consul, Jean Le Vacher. At the same time, he also ordered twelve warships to sea. Learning of this, Louis XIV ordered his ministers to prepare a punitive expedition.

== Bombardment of Algiers (1682) ==
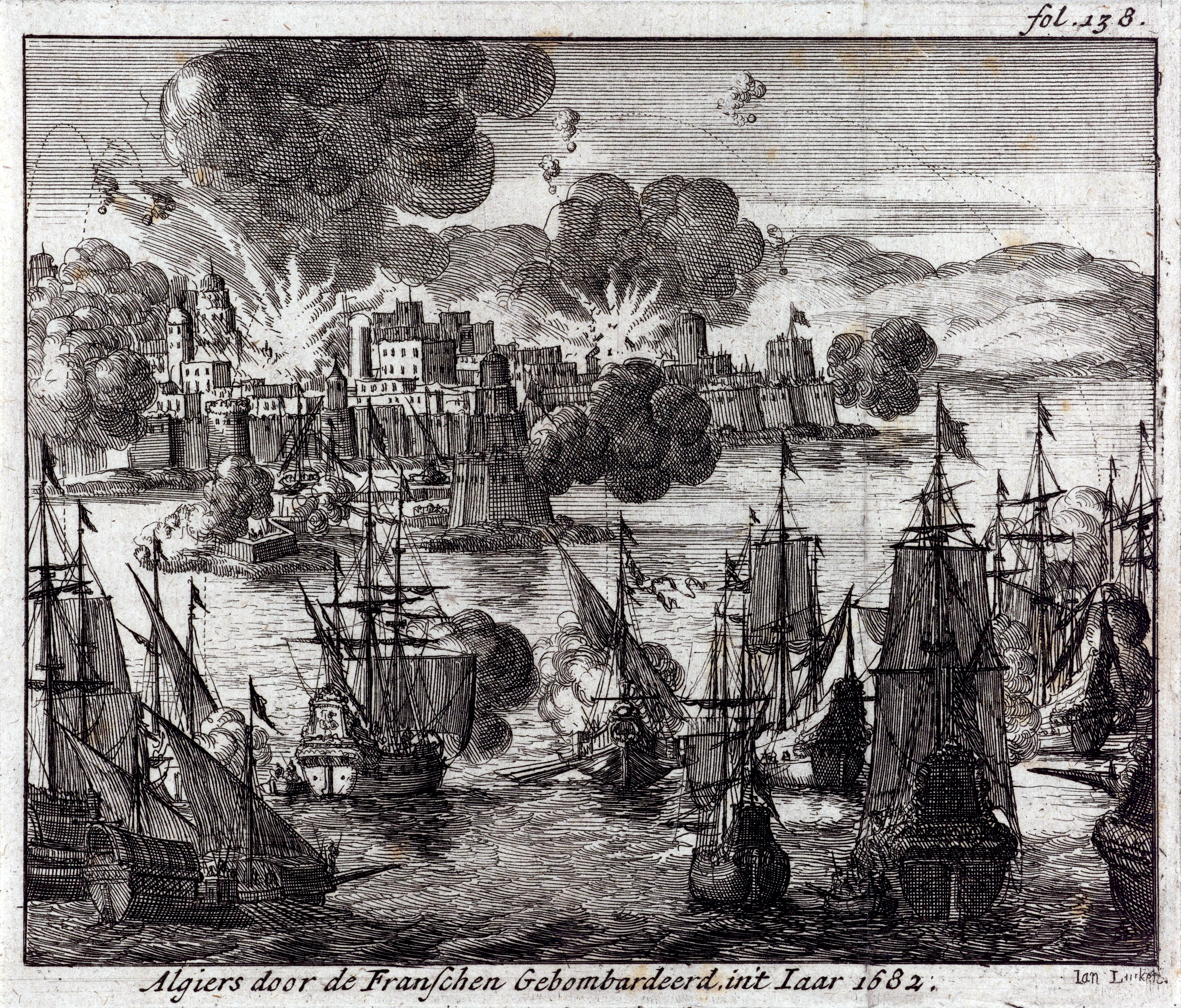
French vessels bombing Algiers in 1682

In 1677, following an explosion in Algiers and several attempts on his life, Dey Mohammed Trik escaped to Tripoli, leaving Algiers to Baba Hassan. Just one year into his rule he was already at war with one of the most powerful countries in Europe, the Kingdom of France. In 1682 France bombarded Algiers for the first time. The outcome of the operation is difficult to assess. Around 500 Algerians were killed, and fifty buildings demolished. The French fleet succeeded in inflicting serious damage on the port and city of Algiers, without suffering any major losses itself, and it forced the Dey to sue for peace. However Duquesne's mission had been to secure Dey's complete submission, which time and the weather had not permitted. When Louis XIV learned on 11 October that the mission had not achieved its aim, he made his displeasure clear. He nevertheless realised the overwhelming effect that relatively few bombs - some 280 - had had on the city. During the French bombardments which followed, in 1683, 1684 and 1688, Duquesne and then Tourville, would force the Dey to free all the Christians he held in slavery, but they did not succeed in ending the corsair war waged by the Regency of Algiers against European merchant vessels in the Mediterranean.

The Jews of Marseilles were suspected of passing warnings to their co-religionists in Algiers about the impending French assault, and this led to their being temporarily expelled from the city.

The next year, Duquesne sailed again to bombard Algiers for the second time.

== Bombardment of Algiers (1683) ==
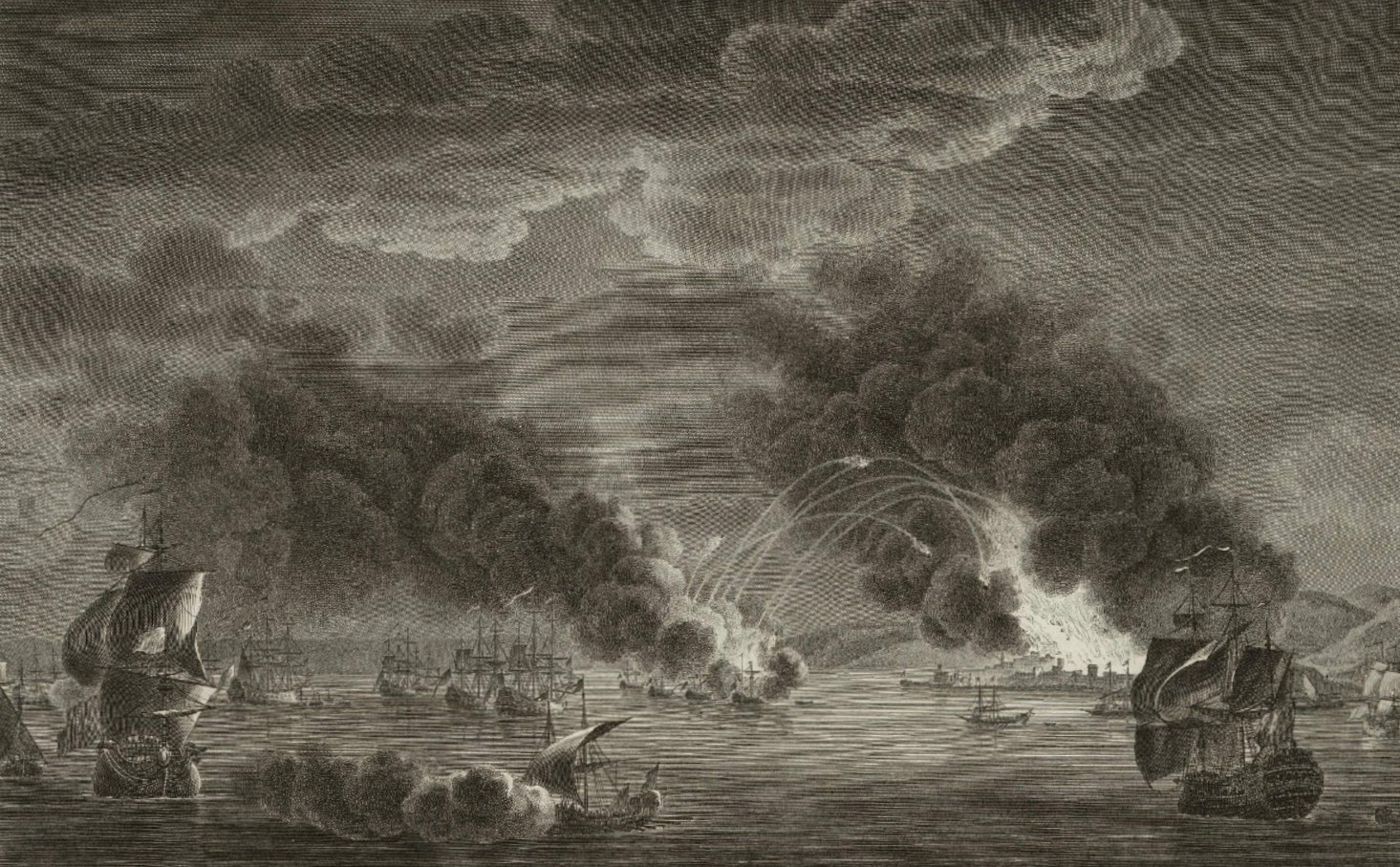
Bombardment of Algiers in 1683 by the French fleet

The bombardment began on the night of 26–27 June, and two hundred and twenty two bombs, launched in less than twenty four hours, started fires in Algiers and prompted general disorder as well as killing around 300 Algerians. Hassan Dey intended to resist nonetheless, but the population urged him to sue for peace. Duquesne agreed to a truce on condition that all Christian slaves were delivered to him. When the truce expired, Hassan Dey asked for, and received, an extension. Duquesne meanwhile set out his terms for agreeing a peace:

- freeing all Christian slaves
- an indemnity equal to the value of all the goods seized from France by pirates
- a solemn embassy to be sent to Louis XIV to ask his forgiveness for the hostile acts committed against his navy.

These terms resolved the Dey to continue resistance.

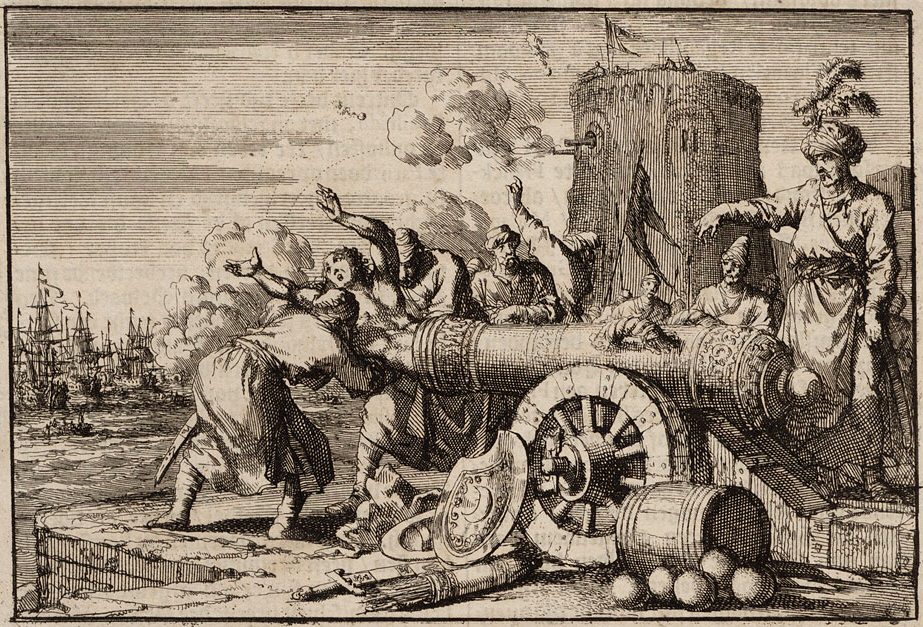
Dutch engraving showing the death of Consul le Vacher, 1698

Before a peace treaty could be signed though, Baba Hassan was deposed and killed by a Raïs called Mezzo Morto Hüseyin. Continuing the war against France, the bombardments resumed, killing many victims. Mezzomorto threatened, if the firing did not cease, to put the Christian captives at the mouths of the cannons, still the bombardments continued. So he carried out his threats.

One of the Algerian commanders, Mezzo Morto Hüseyin Pasha, then seized command and denounced the cowardice of the Dey, for agreeing to treat with the French. He had him put to death and was acclaimed as his successor by the janissaries. Before long a red flag, raised from the heights of the Casbah, announced to Duquesne that combat was resumed. The Algerians replied to the bombs hurled at their city by tying the French consul, Jean Le Vacher, to the mouth of a cannon. On 28 July pieces of his shattered limbs fell on the decks of the French vessels, along with those of other French prisoners blown to pieces.

Despite the fierce resistance of the Algerians, the city was engulfed by an enormous fire which consumed palaces, mosques, and many other buildings across the city; the wounded could not find any refuge; and ammunition ran low. Algiers would have been reduced to ruins had not Duquesne himself run out of missiles. The bombardment ended on 29 July.

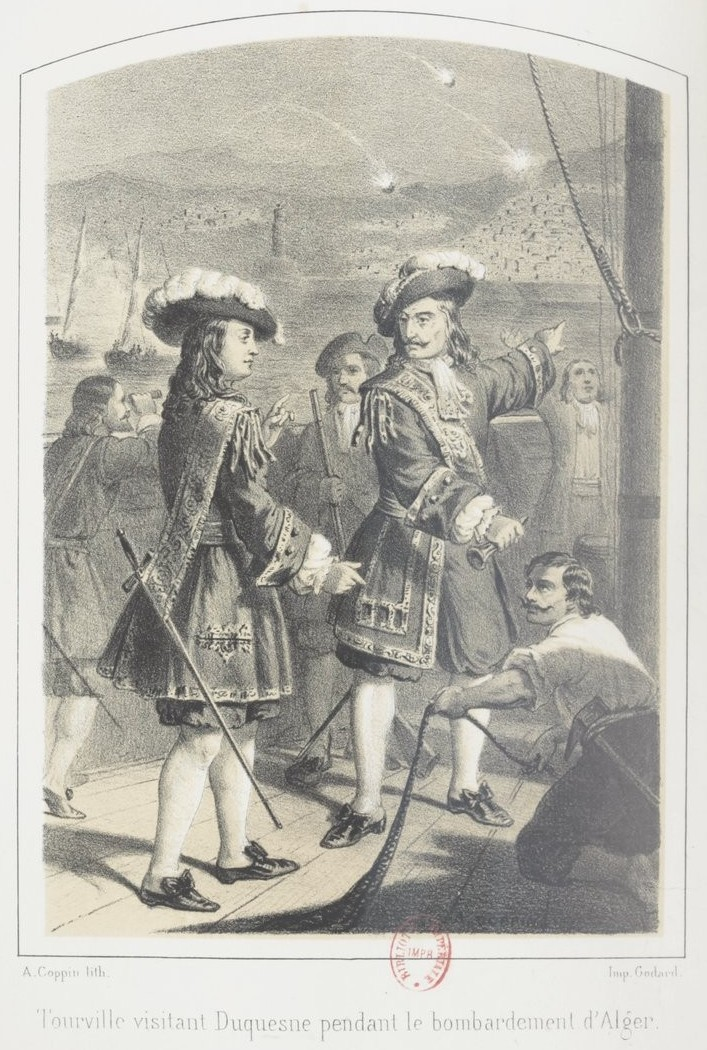
Engraving representing Tourville (left) in a meeting with his leader, Admiral Duquesne (right) during the second bombardment of Algiers in 1683.

The pride of the Algerian pirates was crushed, and as the French fleet returned to France, Algiers sent an embassy under Djiafar-Aga-Effendi to ask forgiveness of Louis XIV, for the injuries and cruelty that the corsairs had inflicted on France.

The new Dey, Mezzo Morto Hüseyin Pasha agreed to free another 546 captives, but refused to sign a peace agreement with Duquesne, who was then 79 years of age, so Louis XIV sent another envoy, Anne Hilarion de Tourville, to treat with him. A hundred-year peace was agreed, including after almost a month of negotiations, a treaty of "Tourville" was signed in April 1684, it included:

- Freedom of trade between the two countries,
- Liberation of slaves,
- Respect of the free passage for naval vessels,
- Free exercise of the Christian religion,
- Establishment of lists of products that are negotiable between the two countries,
- Assurance given to the Dey that his ambassador in Paris could ensure compliance with the treaty.

== Bombardment of Algiers (1688) ==
The agreement was not respected: French corsairs, encouraged by Marseille merchants, again attacked Algerian ships. The Dey retaliated by arresting French nationals and even the consul, without however denouncing the treaty in 1686. The King of France supported the Marseillais.

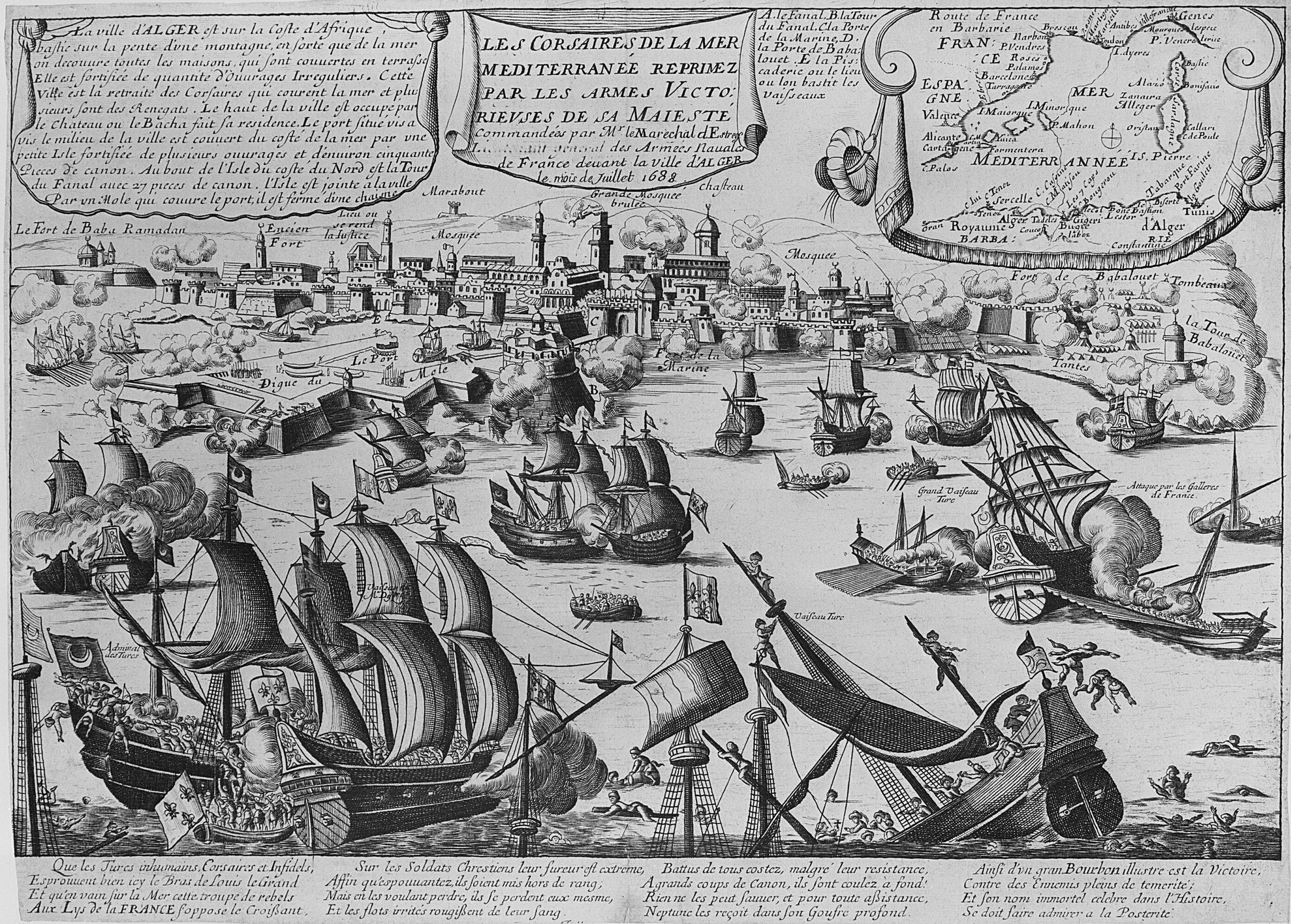
French fleet in combat against Algerian vessels, 1688

In 1688 a military expedition was ordered by Louis XIV against the Regency of Algiers in order to enforce the peace treaty of 1683 which had been violated by Algerian pirates. The squadron, comprising 31 ships and 10 bomb galiots, was commanded by Jean II d'Estrées.

D'Estrées' squadron arrived at Algiers on 26 June. The bombardment lasted several days, and succeeded in inflicting serious damage on the city. Hadj Mezzomorto killed more than forty Christians by cannon and the French responded by executing Muslim hostages on board. Algerian artillery defences had been strengthened since the previous French expeditions in 1682 and 1683, and so the Algerians sank several French ships. Faced with determined resistance, the French fleet was obliged to retire after 16 days. Mezzo Morto retaliated by attackin the French coast and shipping.

== Aftermath ==
By the end of 1688, the Ottoman Sultan Suleiman II, at the request of the King of France, sent a new pasha to Algiers. But the Dey felt so strong that he did not allow a delegate from Istanbul to land in Algiers. This show of force prompted the janissaries who were fearing for their influence to depose him and force him to flee. They choose Hadj-Chaban as his successor. The new Dey sent a plenipotentiary to Versailles; Stadtholder of the United Provinces William of Orange who was Louis XIV's most bitter personal enemy. Having become William III of England, immediately aroused a general coalition in Europe against the Sun King. The latter was then reduced to putting an end to the disputes which then opposed him to Pope Alexander VIII as well as to the Dey of Algiers. Relations with France, which were restored in 1688, improved, especially after the Dey had sent the ambassador Mohammed-el-Amine to France. On 24 September 1689, a treaty was signed in Algiers.

== See also ==
- Franco-Algerian war (1609–1628)
- Ordinance of Marine

== Sources ==
- Gaïd, Mouloud (2014) [1975]. L'Algérie sous les Turcs [Algeria under the Turks] (in French). Mimouni. ISBN 978-9961-68-157-2.
- Kaddache, Mahfoud (2003). L'Algérie des Algériens de la préhistoire à 1954 [Algeria of the Algerians: Prehistory to 1954] (in French). Paris-Méditerranée. ISBN 978-2-84272-166-4.
- Panzac, Daniel (2005). The Barbary Corsairs: The End of a Legend, 1800-1820. BRILL. ISBN 978-90-04-12594-0.
