= La Consulaire =

Algerian artillery, monument in Brest, France

Coordinates: 48°23′10″N 4°29′43″W

- Type: Costal Artillery cannon
- Place of origin: Regency of Algiers (Ottoman Algeria)

Service history
- In service: 1542-1830 (Regency of Algiers)
- Wars: Bombardment of Algiers (1682-1683); Invasion of Algiers

Production history
- Designer: Ordered by Hasan Pacha
- Manufacturer: Venetian
- Produced: 1542

Specifications
- Mass: 12 tons

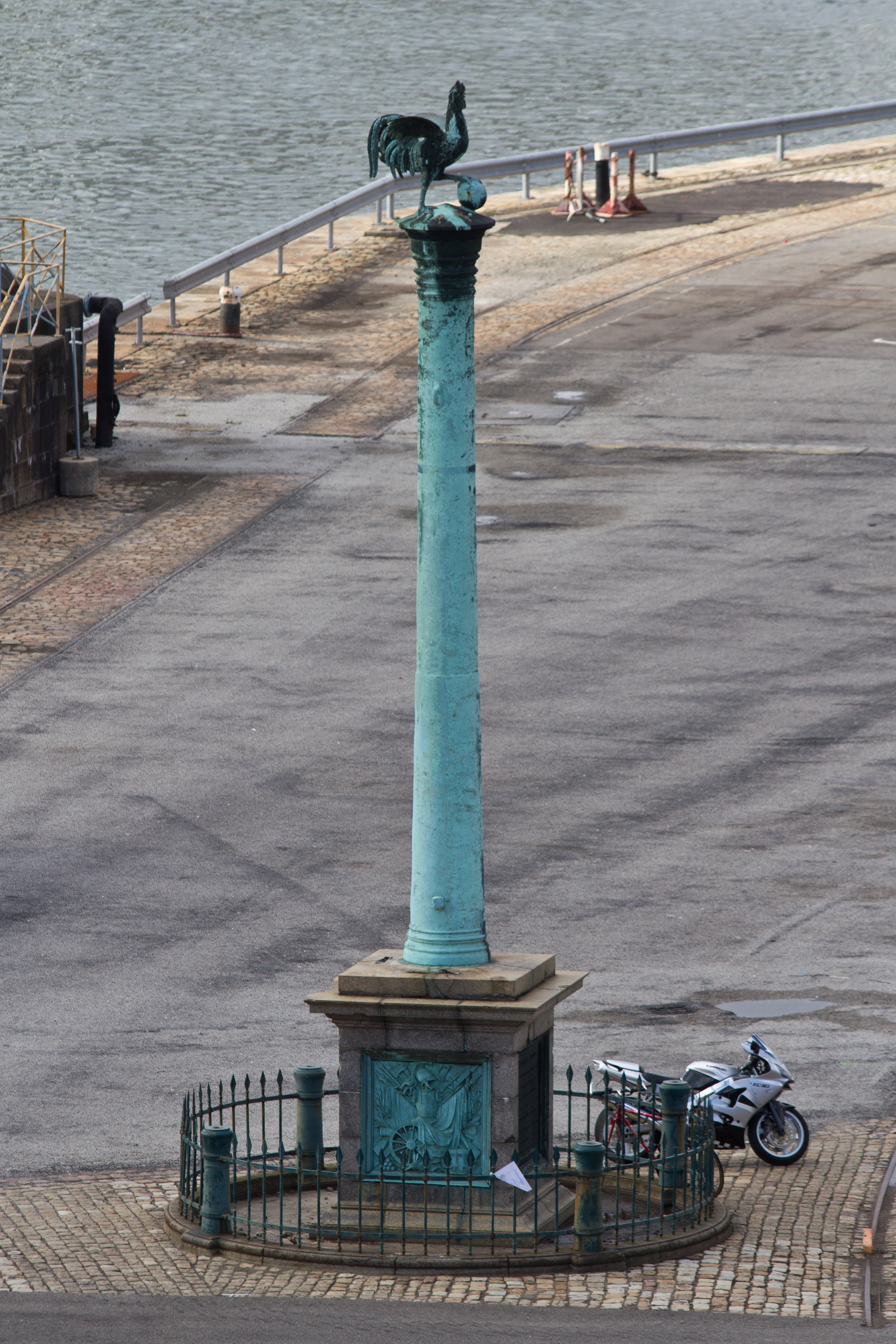
La Consulaire on display in the arsenal of Brest

La Consulaire (English: The Consul) is the name of a very large Algerian Barbary artillery piece which famously defended Algiers harbour. It was looted by the French during the Invasion of Algiers in 1830, on 5 July, and taken as a trophy to Brest, where it is still displayed.

La Consulaire is a 23-foot long smoothed-bore muzzle-loading gun, ordered by Hasan Pasha (son of Barbarossa) for the completion of the fortifications of Algiers. It was founded in Algiers in 1542 by a Venetian founder for Hasan Agha. Its original name is Baba Marzug ("lucky father"). Weighing twelve tons, it could fire projectiles of 80 kg (176 pounds) up to five kilometers (three miles).

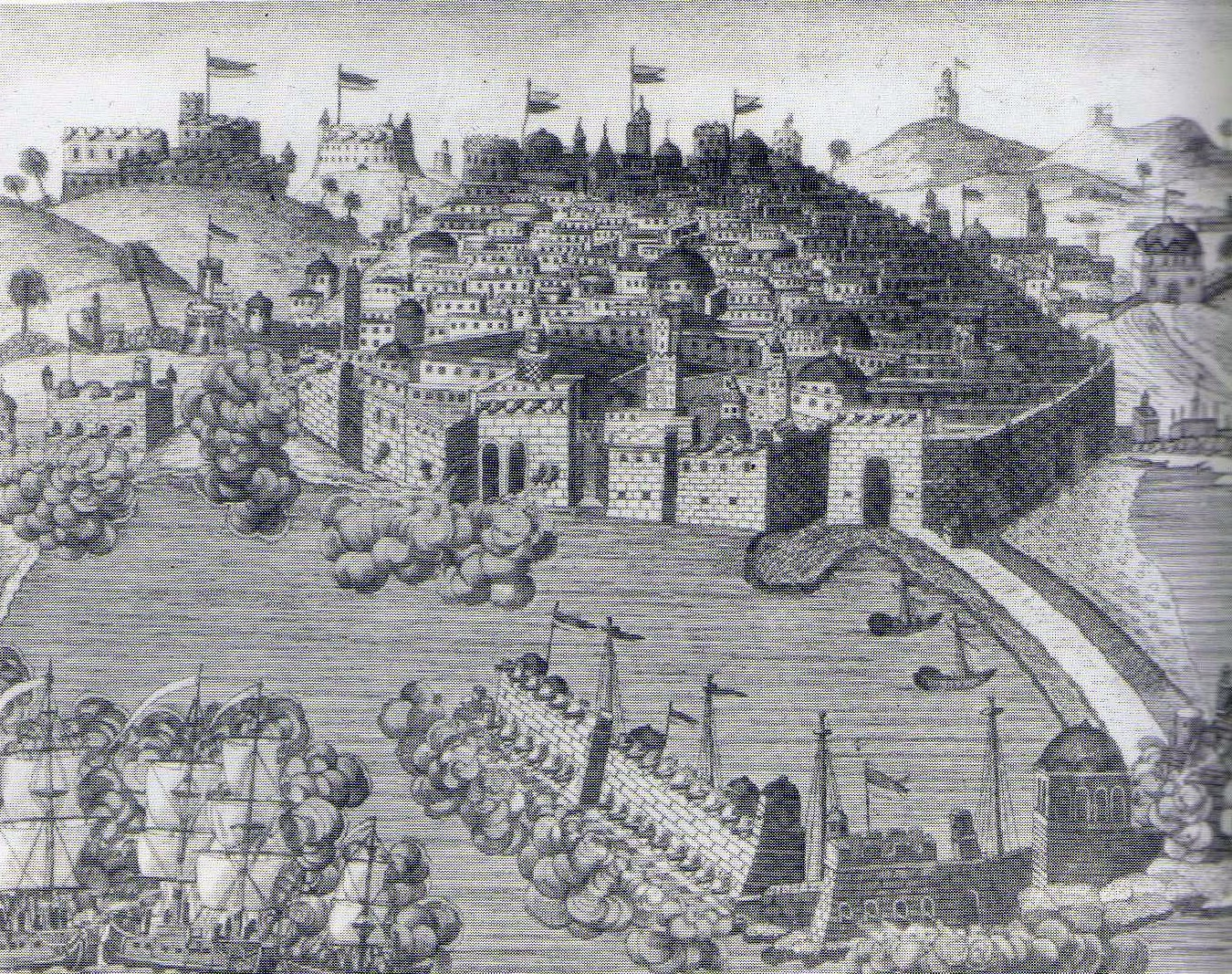
Bombing of Algiers in 1682

The gun was used in 1683 to project the limbs of the consul of France, Jean Le Vacher, towards the fleet of Admiral Duquesne, earning it its name.

In 1830, a fleet under Admiral Duperré conquered Algiers and captured the gun. It was brought back to Brest and mounted on a granite stand decorated with high reliefs, and is on display inside the military zone of the Arsenal, near Recouvrance Bridge.

== Gallery ==
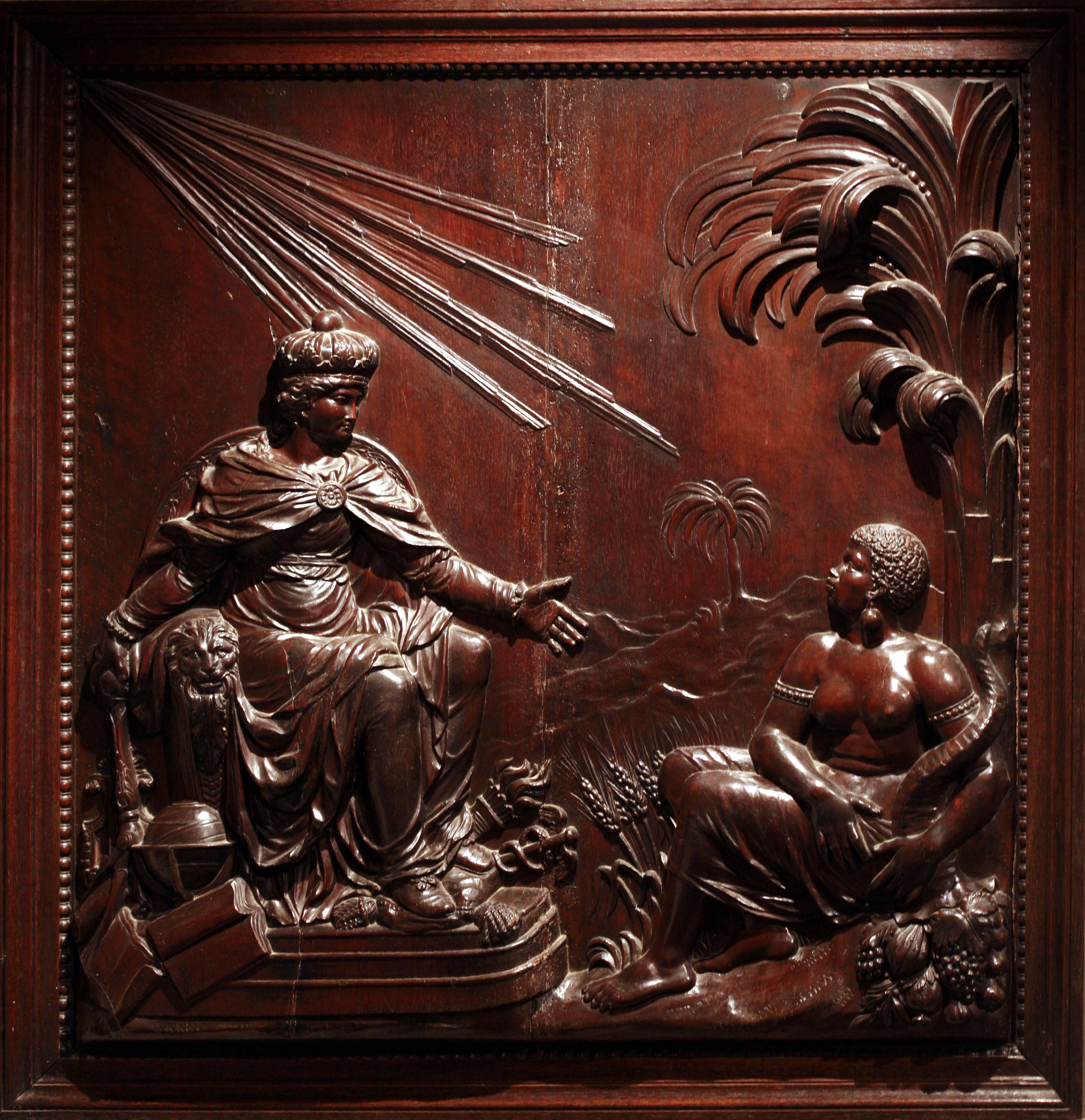
Base panel: France casting the rays of science unto Africa

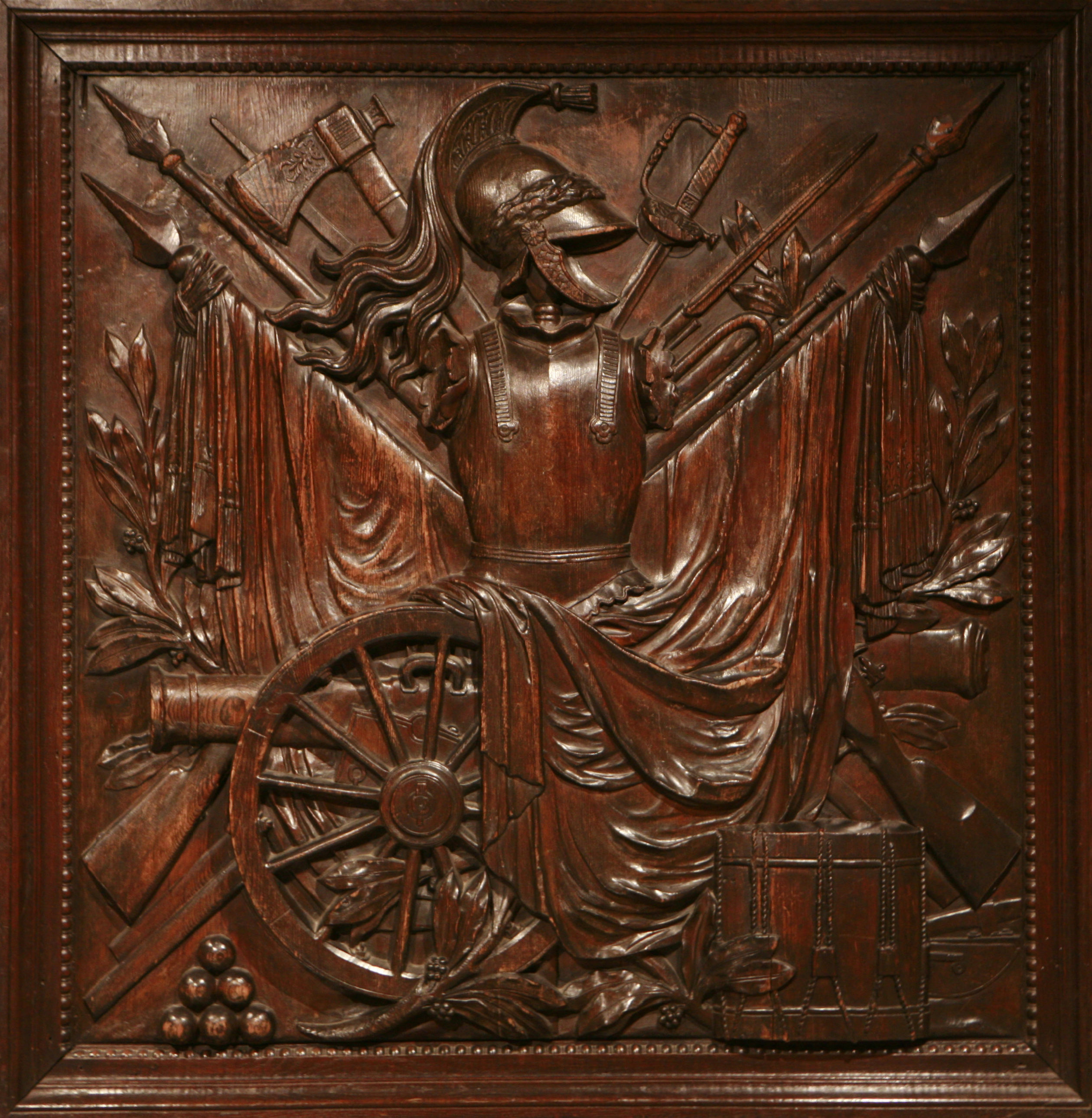
Base panel: the Army

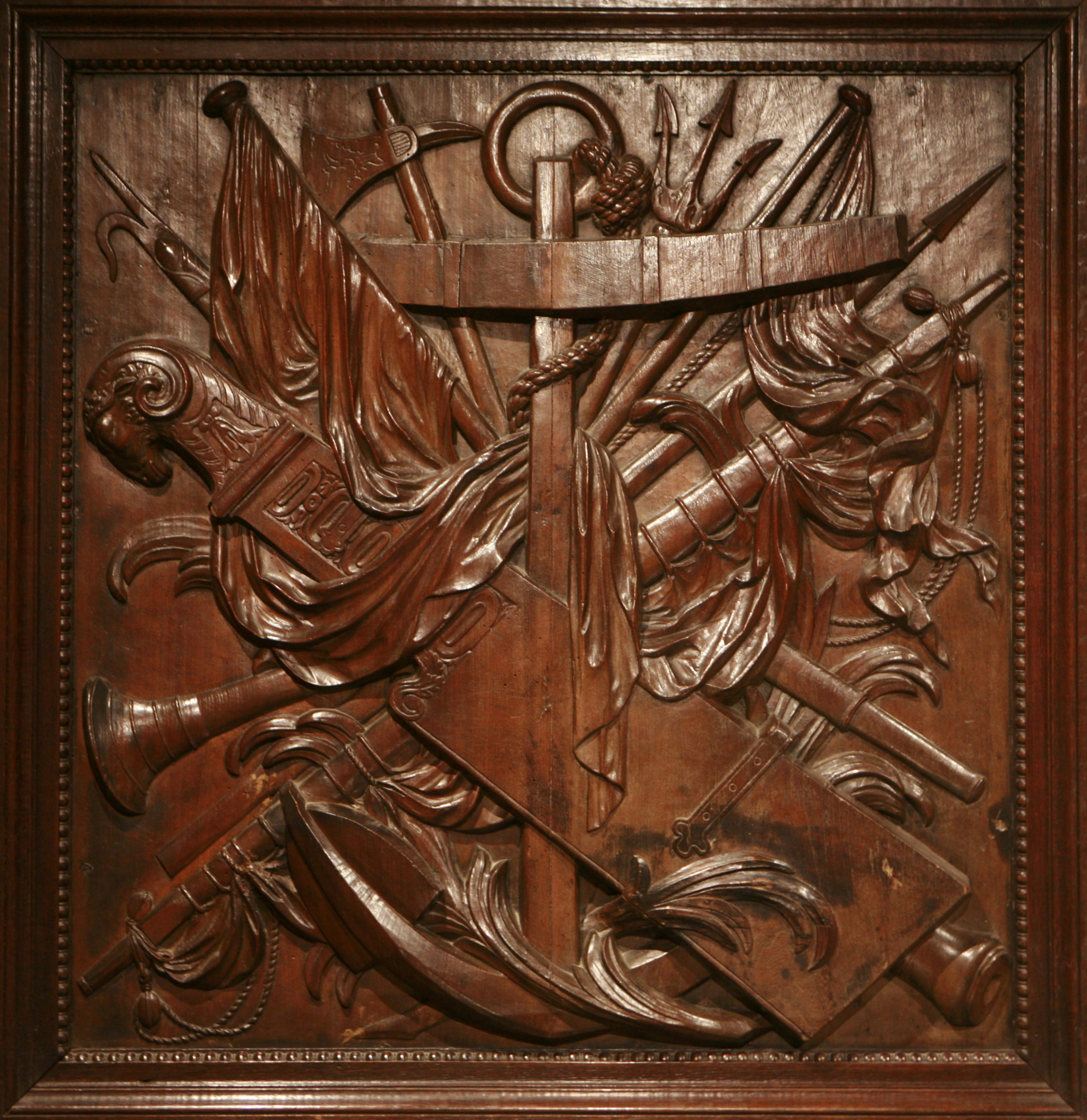
Base panel: the Navy

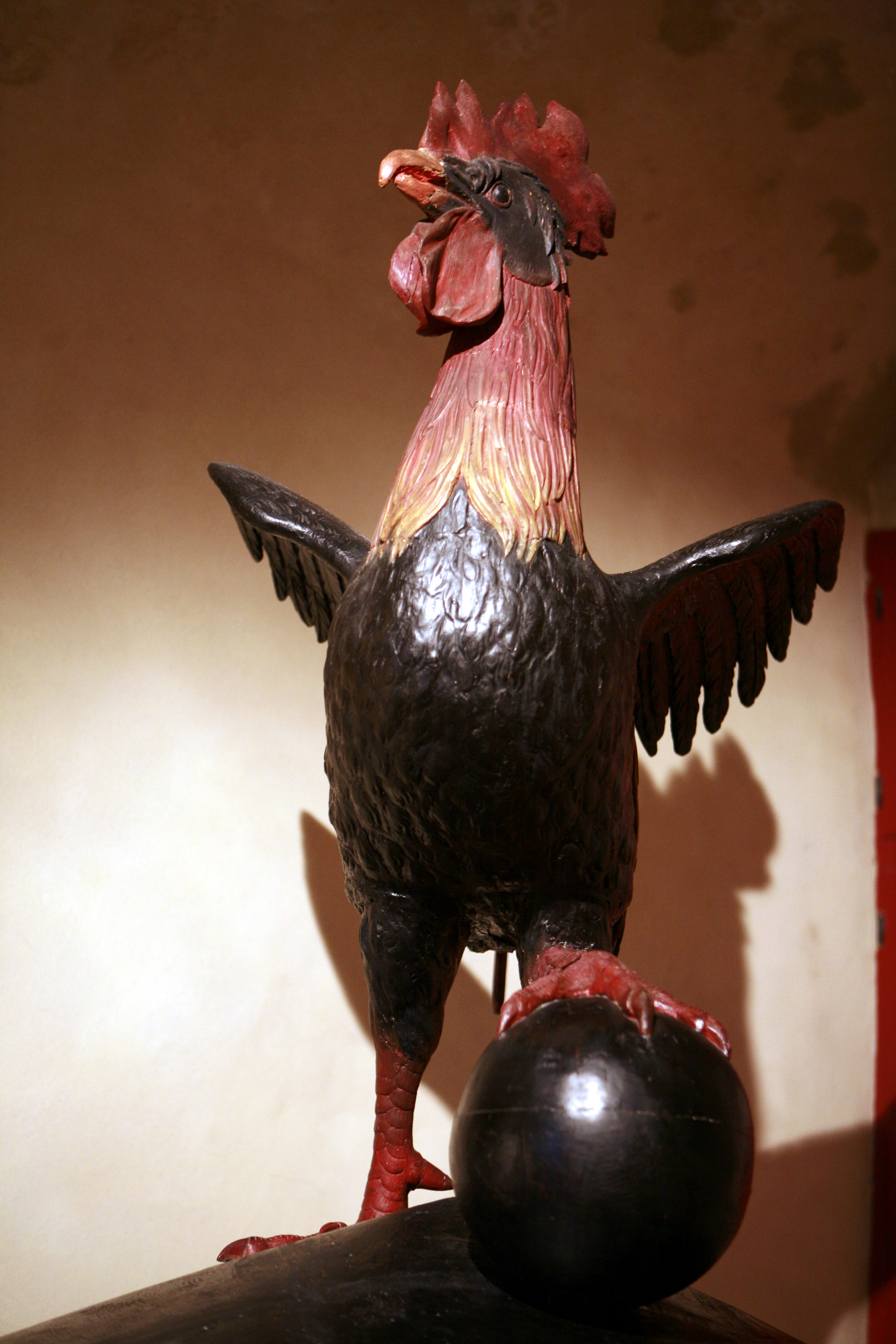
Top of the monument

== Sources and references ==
- Wikibrest

Specific
