= Anglo-Algerian War =

War in the Mediterranean Sea (1677–1682)

Anglo–Algerian War (1677–1682)
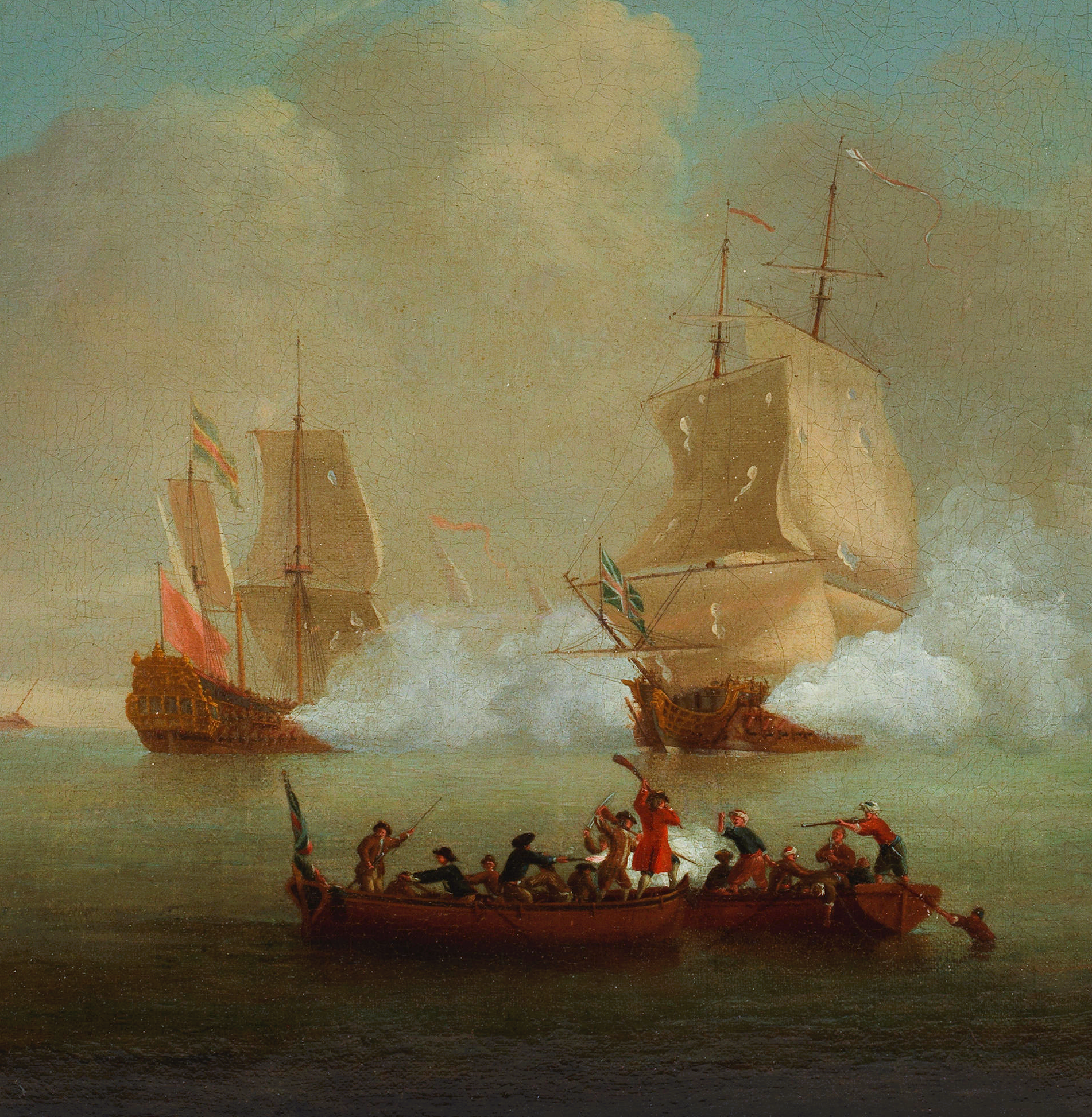
- A fierce encounter between the Royal Navy and the infamous Barbary pirates
Date	1677–1682
Location	Mediterranean Sea
Result	Algerian victory

Belligerents
Regency of Algiers	Kingdom of England

Commanders and leaders
Mohammed Trik	Charles II; John Narborough; Arthur Herbert

Casualties and losses
Unknown	153–500 ships 1,850–3,000 men captured

The Anglo-Algerian War took place between 1677 and 1682. The war happened after the Royal Navy defeated several Barbary corsairs of Algiers near Bougie in 1672; the Algerian Diwan responded by capturing sailors and ships between 1674 and 1676. In 1677, Algiers declared war on England.

The Algerians began capturing English ships in the Channel. The English admiral, John Narborough, began blockading Algiers. Several Algerian and English ships engaged in pitched battles in the western Mediterranean Sea. The English Admiral, Arthur Herbert, 1st Earl of Torrington, succeeded Narborough in the Mediterranean. Several English merchant ships were captured by the Algerians during the war. Notable smaller ones were Robert of Dartmouth with 6 crews on October 29, 1677, and Speedwell with 5 crews in September 1679. The Algerian also captured large ones, including Phoenix and its 49 crew. The English ships William and Samuel were blown up during a battle with Algerians. 25 were killed and 21 were captured in June 1679.

The Algerians captured 153 ships (some higher estimates go to 500) and between 1,850 and 3,000 English subjects. The war ended in 1682 with a treaty between both nations. The ransom for the sailors cost £100 each and the important passengers £1,000, which was added to their cargo and vessels. This whole ransom cost the English between £500,000 and £800,000. The English also agreed to pay subsidies and promised their ships to carry formal passes, which the Algerians agreed to and respected.

== Sources ==
- Adrian Tinniswood (2010), Pirates of Barbary, Corsairs, Conquests and Captivity in the Seventeenth-Century Mediterranean.
- Bernard Capp (2022), British Slaves and Barbary Corsairs, 1580–1750.
- Linda Colley (2007), Captives, Britain, Empire, and the World, 1600–1850.
