= Battle of Andros (1696) =

1696 between Venice and the Ottoman Empire

- Part of the Morean War
Date	22 August 1696
Location	west of Andros, Ottoman Empire
Result	Venetian victory

Belligerents
Ottoman Empire; Regency of Algiers	Republic of Venice

Commanders and leaders
Mezzomorto	Bartolomeo Contarini

The battle of Andros took place on 22 August 1696 west of the Ottoman island of Andros between the fleets of the Republic of Venice and the Papal States under Bartolomeo Contarini on the one side, and the Ottoman Navy under Mezzo Morto Hüseyin Pasha as well as Barbary vassals on the other. The encounter was indecisive, and no vessels were lost on either side.

== Background ==
Contarini, with 22 sailing ships, left Porto Poro on 28 July and arrived at Port Gavrion, on the west coast of Andros, on 3 August, while a galley force, under Alessandro Molin, went to Kekhrios, on mainland Greece, ready for an attack on Thebes.

On 6 August the Muslim fleet of 20 Ottoman and 15 African ships was sighted north of Andros. It sailed around to Gavrion and tried to tempt Contarini out, but the wind was from the north and Contarini had orders not to engage unless he had the weather gauge, and even after the Ottomans sent galliots in and landed troops all he did was send a small craft to drive them off. The Ottomans left and anchored to the west. For ten days nothing happened, except for a French merchantman entering the harbor being fired on by the Venetians, who mistook it for a fireship.

== Battle ==
On 20 August the north wind dropped and at 5:00 pm the Ottoman fleet appeared again off the town and opened fire, with little result, before becoming becalmed to the south during the night. On 21 August the wind was from the north again and Contarini, seeing his chance, sailed, but the wind dropped at about 12:00 pm and he made for the southeast end of Andros with what wind there was, being joined there by the galley force that had just arrived from the west, early on 22 August. A slight easterly wind gave Contarini another chance and he sailed west, the galleys towing the sailing ships, toward the south end of the Ottomans, who were arranged vaguely in an easterly Ottoman line and a westerly African line but mainly in a group formation, and turned north, coming alongside them with his first seven ships (Tigre, Rosa, San Andrea, San Lorenzo Giustinian (flag), San Domenico, Fede Guerriera and San Sebastiano) and attacking at about 12:00 am. At about 2:00 pm the rowing vessels detached and formed a line abreast to the south of the Ottomans. Both sides' sailing ships formed themselves more or less into lines, and the Ottoman fleet gradually bore away. At 4:00 pm the wind dropped and the Venetian galleys, which had cut back through the line, then re-emerged and attacked the Ottomans in a line abreast. The Turks withdrew after about two hours, eventually making their way south to near the island of Syros, while the Venetians eventually sailed back to Port Gavrion. Until 1 December the Venetians sailed around looking for the Ottoman fleet, when they heard that it had sailed back into the Dardanelles almost a month earlier.

Christian casualties were 56 killed and 125 wounded in the sailing ships and about 19 casualties in the rowing vessels.

== Opposing forces ==
=== Venice (Contarini) ===
- San Lorenzo Giustinian 80 (flag)
- Tigre 66
- Rosa 60
- San Andrea 60
- San Domenico 60
- Fede Guerriera 56
- San Sebastiano 68
- 15 other sailing ships
- some galleasses
- some galleys
- unknown number of Papal ships

=== Ottoman Empire (Mezzo Morto) ===
- 20 Ottoman sailing ships
- 15 or 16 Barbary ships
- some galliots

== Bibliography ==
- Anderson, R. C. (1952). Naval Wars in the Levant 1559–1853. Princeton: Princeton University Press.
