= Bombardment of Algiers (1682) =

1682 bombardment

Bombardment of Algiers, 1682
- Part of Franco–Algerian war (1681–1688)
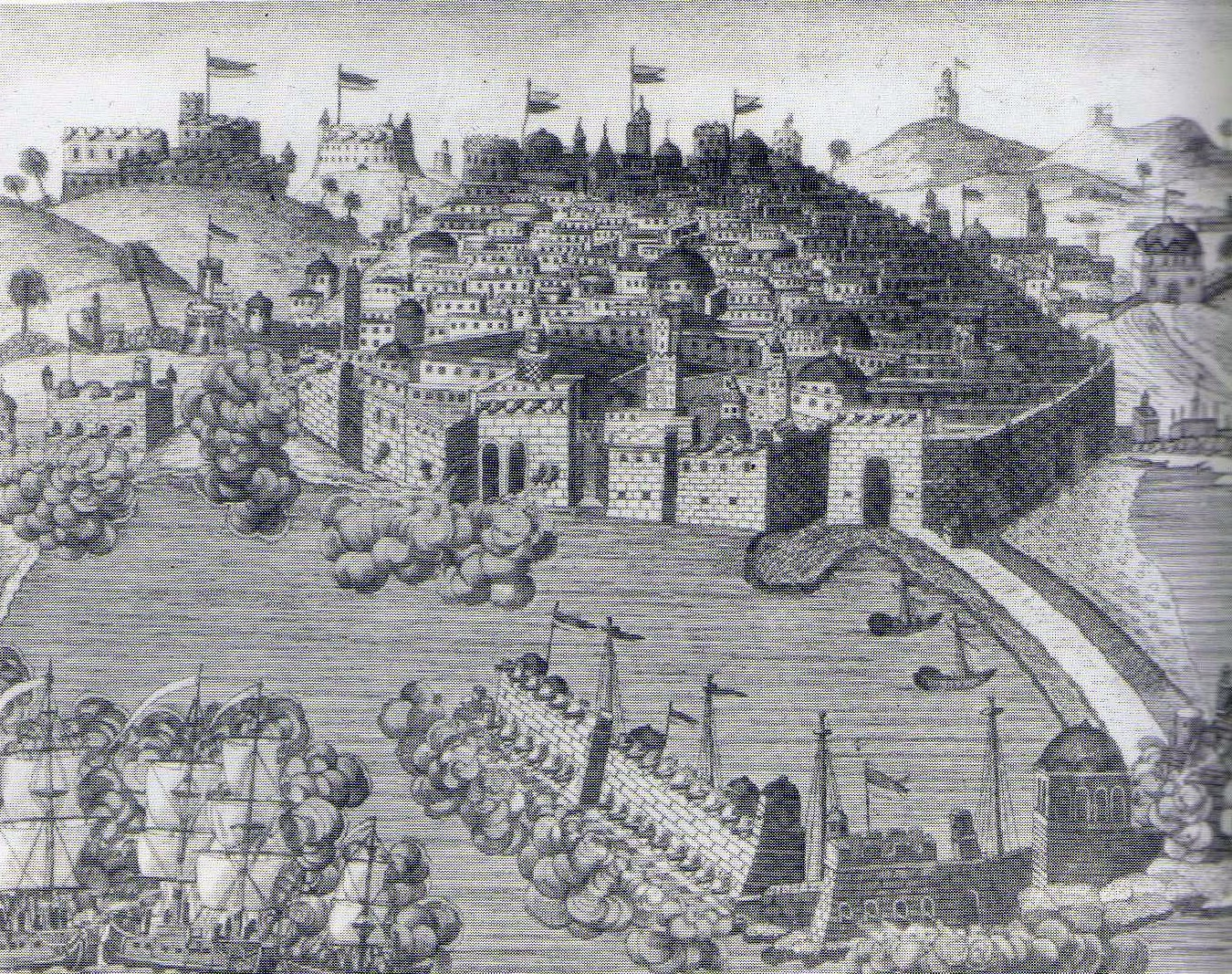
- Bombardment of Algiers by the fleet of Admiral Duquesne in 1682
Date	July–August 1682
Location	Algiers
Result	Algerian victory

Belligerents
France	Regency of Algiers

Commanders and leaders
Abraham Duquesne	Baba Hassan

Units involved
11 ships of the line 15 galleys 5 bomb galiots 2 fireships other small vessels	Unknown

Casualties and losses
Unknown	500 dead

The bombardment of Algiers in 1682 was a naval operation by France against the Regency of Algiers during the Franco–Algerian war (1681–1688). Louis XIV sent Duquesne to bombard Algiers after the Dey declared war on France in 1681. Duquesne sailed from Toulon with a fleet of around forty vessels and reached Algiers in July 1682 after many delays caused by poor weather. Bombarded several times in August, the city suffered extensive damage. The danger of the corsair captains who managed to manoeuvre their ships so as to threaten the French position and bad weather forced Duquesne to retreat to French waters.

== Background ==
In October 1680, barbary pirates captured a number of French vessels, without declaration of war, and took the captains and crews to Algiers as slaves. On 18 October the Dey of Algiers, Baba-Hassan, officially declared war on Louis XIV and on 23 October, he announced the commencement to hostilities to the French consul, Jean Le Vacher. At the same time, he also ordered twelve warships to sea. Learning of this, Louis XIV ordered his ministers to prepare a punitive expedition.

Command was given to Duquesne, with the comte de Tourville as his co-commander, and, as rear admirals, the chevalier de Lhéry and the marquis d'Amfreville. The fleet comprised eleven ships of the line, fifteen galleys commanded by the chevalier de Noailles, five bomb galiots, two fireships and various small vessels. The galiots were a new invention, eagerly promoted by Colbert, which would see their first action off Algiers.

== French naval forces ==
Duquesne left Toulon on 12 July at the head of eleven warships and five galiots.

Ships of the line: Le Saint-Esprit, 74 cannon, Abraham Duquesne (LG); L'Aimable, Le Cheval Marin, 44 cannon, Jean Erard de Belle-Isle; L'Assuré, Vigilant, 54 cannon, comte de Tourville (LG); Le Vaillant, ? cannon, M. de Beaulieu; Le Prudent, ? cannon, Chevalier de Lhéry (CE); Le Laurier, L'Indien, 38 cannon, L'Étoile, ? cannon, Job Forant; L'Éole,	bomb galiots: La Menaçante, capitaine des Herbiers; La Cruelle, chevalier de Combes; La Bombarde, Baron de Pointis; La Foudroyante ou La Fulminante, Bernard Renau d'Eliçagaray; La Brûlante, M. Beaussier

On 18 July, after an easy crossing, Duquesne anchored at Ibiza where he met up with fifteen galleys commanded by the duc de Mortemart (1679–1688).

Galleys: La Sirène; La Madame; L'Amazone; La Hardie; La Réale; La Valeur; La Fière; La Patrone	L'Invincible; La Couronne; La Saint Louis; La Forte; La Fleur de lis; La Reine; La Grande

== Attack on Algiers ==
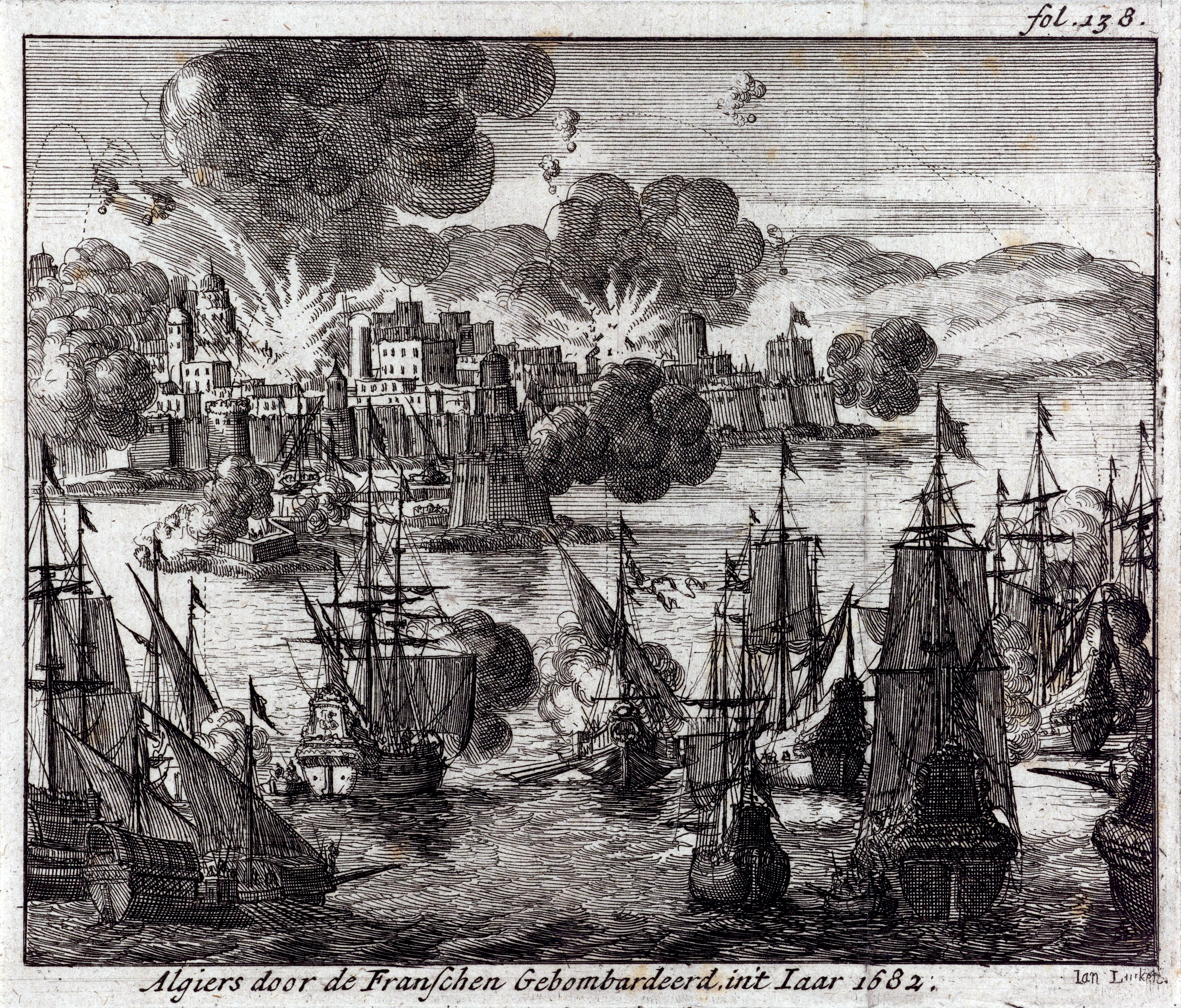
Algiers bombarded by the French, 1682. Dutch engraving 1689.

The fleet reached Algiers on 22 July 1682. Duquesne's orders were to bombard Algiers into complete submission. Preparing his attack, he sent a detachment of ships commanded by M. de la Maurinière to set fire to two Turkish ships in the port of Cherchell. He then arranged his vessels so as to be ready to attack Algiers, using his galleys to tow his ships of the line and galiots into position.

However the weather was so bad that the first half of August without him being able to order the attack. On 15 August, he sent his galleys back to Marseille as their crews could bear the terrible conditions no longer. This made it difficult for his galiots to manoeuvre. To let them approach and retire from the city in safety, he had longboats commanded by Job Forant carry five anchors close in to the north east of the city, with 2,000 fathoms of cable connecting them to the galiots.

On 16 August the longboats dropped their anchors near the mole and the galiots were hauled along the cables into position. However it was only on the night of the 20 August that the French were ready to begin their bombardment. The first assault was largely ineffective as the galiots were too far away from their targets, Nicolas Camelin and Pierre Landouillette de Logivière having misjudged the distance.

The French decided that it would be better to anchor off the northwest of the city, and on the order of the chevalier de Tourville, Belle-Isle-Erard anchored two ships in position on the night of 20–21 August, and le chevalier de Lhéry brought up three others the next night, much closer in than the ships of Belle-Isle-Erard. Landouillette, captain of the bomb galiots, fired the mortars on board La Cruelle himself. The bombs barely reached the mole and did not touch the city. On 26 August they adjusted their positions again and after this kept up an intense and well-targeted bombardment until 5 September, inflicting serious damage on the port and the city.

The second night of the bombardment was 30 August. The galiots hauled themselves into position along their cables and fired from much closer to the mole. Tourville, whom Duquesne had placed in command of the second attack, adjusted the ships’ distances again and brought the La Cruelle in before the lighthouse of Algiers. on the third night of bombardment, on the night of the 3 and 4 September, the galiots were closer in still, near the mole. The next night, Duquesne sent the galiots in closer still, 200–260 toises (400–520 metres; 1,300–1,700 feet) from the mole, and around 800 metres (2,600 ft) from the city wall. That night, they repelled an attack on the galiots by an Algerian galley, three brigantines and a number of smaller boats. On 4 September, the Dey sent Jean Le Vacher to Duquesne to sue for peace. Duquesne indicated to Le Vacher that if the Algerian authorities had proposals for peace to make, they should present them themselves, and that he still had four thousand bombs to fire on them if their proposals were not satisfactory.

On 13 September, the corsair captains managed to manoeuvre their ships so as to threaten the French position. Shortly afterwards, with bad weather making it impossible for the French to hold their positions, they were obliged to abandon the bombardment and retire to France.

== Aftermath ==
Around 500 Algerians were killed, and fifty buildings demolished.

The Jews of Marseilles were suspected of passing warnings to their co-religionists in Algiers about the impending French assault, and this led to them being temporarily expelled from the city.

The next year, Duquesne sailed again to bombard Algiers for the second time in 1683.
