= Franco-Algerian war (1609–1628) =

Franco_Algerian war 1606–1628

| Date | 1609–1628 |
| Location | Mediterranean Sea, France |
| Result | Algerian victory |

Belligerents
| Regency of Algiers | France |

Commanders and leaders
| Unknown | Henry IV of France # Louis XIII |

Strength
| Algerian Pirates: Unknown | Unknown |

Casualties and losses
| Unknown | Between 1613 and 1626: 936 ships; 8,000 French enslaved |

The Franco-Algerian war of 1609–1628 occurred because of a Dutch pirate named Simon Dansa who declared his conversion to Islam and joined the Algerian navy in 1603, and then later conspired with the French consul in Algeria in an attempt to collect more wealth, so he collected his money and fled with it to France, including two of advanced bronze cannons he had been lent to him by the Pasha of Algiers.

The Algerians were greatly disturbed by the incident, which made the Pasha officially declare war on the Kingdom of France after its refusal to return the two cannons and punish Simone Dansa. During the war, France lost millions of francs and thousands of people who turned into slaves in Algeria, which forced it to surrender and return the two cannons in 1628.

== See also ==
- Franco-Algerian war (1681–1688)
