= Action of 6 July 1697 =

1697 naval battle

There was a series of battles that took place in 1697 when the Venetian fleet, under Bartolomeo Contarini, hunted down the Turkish fleet in the Aegean Sea.

== Actions ==
The actions took place on 6 July near Lemnos, on 1 September between Andros and Euboea, and on 20 September south of Euboea. Both sides had about twenty-six battleships as well as several smaller vessels. Casualties for Venice were seventy-one killed and 163 wounded in the first battle and 191 killed and 516 wounded in the last.

== Order of battle ==
=== Venice ===
(The number after the name refers to the number of cannon in the ship's main armament.)

San Lorenzo Giustinian 70/80 (flag)
Aurora 80
San Domenico 60
Valor Coronado 54
Nettuno 50/60
Rosa 60
Fenice 56
Fede Guerriera 56
Iride 60/66
San Sebastiano 68 – Blew up, 1 (or 2?) September
Tigre 66
Giove 64
Sole d'Oro 70
Rizzo d'Oro (not in 1st battle)
Amazzone Guerriera (not in first battle)
Redentore del Mundo 70
Venere Armata 52
Vittoria 50/60
San Nicolo 54
Sacra Lega 60
San Andrea 60
Ercole Vittorioso 50/60
Pace ed Abbondanza 50
San Vittorio 62
San Giovanni Battista Grande 60
Madonna della Salute 50
Fama Volante 50
Cavallo Marino (merchantman)
Madonna del Rosario (merchantman)
? (fireship) – Expended 20 September
? (fireship)
several galliots and galleys (one of each captured during the first battle)

=== Ottoman Empire ===
1 3-decker battleship (likely to have been a seventy or eighty gunner)
25 other battleships (likely to have been fifty to sixty four gunners)
19 galliots (more galliots joined before the third battle)
2 fireships
