= Baba Hassan =

Ruler of Algiers (d. 1683)

- Dey of Algiers

2nd Dey of Algiers
- Reign: 1682–1683 (officially, De jure); 1677–1683 (De facto)
- Predecessor: Mohammed Trik
- Successor: Mezzo Morto Hüseyin Pasha
- Died: 1683; Palace of Jenina, Regency of Algiers
- Country: Regency of Algiers
- Religion: Islam
- Occupation: Corsair then Dey
- Military career
- Conflicts: Franco-Algerian war (1681–1688)

Baba Hassan was the 2nd ruler and Dey of Algiers. He ruled one year after his predecessor Mohamed Trik.

== Rule ==
He assumed control after Mohammed Trik, the previous dey, and an elderly Corsair left politics and gave the title of Dey to him in 1677. He was officially announced as ruler in 1682. He waged war against France, but after the Bombardment of Algiers in 1683, he was forced to capitulate. The Diwan of Algiers did not accept this decision. Another rais called Mezzo Morto Hüseyin Pasha killed him in the Palace of Jenina, taking away powers from him, and assuming the role of dey.

== See also ==
- List of governors and rulers of the Regency of Algiers
