= Battle of the Oinousses Islands =

Part of the Morean War (Sixth Ottoman-Venetian War)

Coordinates: 38.7013°N 26.5055°E

- Part of the Morean War (Sixth Ottoman–Venetian War)
Date	9 and 19 February 1695
Location	near the Oinousses Islands
Result	Algerian victory

Belligerents
Republic of Venice	Regency of Algiers

Commanders and leaders
(Republic of Venice) Antonio Zeno	Mezzo Morto Hüseyin Pasha

Strength
21 sailing ships 5 galeasses 21 galleys	20 sailing ships 24 galleys

The Battle of the Oinousses Islands (Italian: Battaglia di Spalmadori) comprised two separate actions, on 9 and 19 February 1695 near the Oinousses (Turkish: Koyun Adaları), a small island group off Cape Karaburun in western Anatolia, between a Venetian fleet under Antonio Zeno and the Algerian fleet under Mezzo Morto Hüseyin. The result of the first battle was a Venetian defeat, and although the second engagement ended in a draw, the Venetian position in Chios became untenable, forcing Zeno to abandon the island, which had been captured a few months earlier.

In the first engagement, Venetian casualties were 142 killed and 300 wounded on the sailing ships, excluding the three ships lost, and 323 killed and 303 wounded on the galleys. Altogether, there were fewer than 2,500 casualties. In the second engagement, the Venetians were at a numerical disadvantage, due to the loss of three ships and the absence of the damaged San Vittorio. Venetian deaths were 132, and Fama Volante was damaged, along with 2 Ottoman sailing ships.

== Opposing forces (9 February) ==
=== Venice (Zeno) ===
- Stella Maris - Blew up
- Rosa 60
- San Lorenzo Giustinian 70/80
- Leon Coronato - Blew up
- Nettuno 50/60
- Valor Coronato 54
- San Domenico 60
- Redentore del Mundo 70
- Vittoria 50/60
- San Nicolo 54
- Sacra Lega 60
- Drago Volante c.60 - Blew up
- Fama Volante 50
- Madonna della Salute 50
- Venere Armata 52
- Ercole Vittorioso 50/60
- San Antonio di Padova c.50
- Pace ed Abbondanza 50
- San Giovanni Battista Piccolo c.50
- San Vittorio 62 - Damaged
- San Giovanni Battista Grande 60
- 5 galleasses
- 21 galleys

=== Regency of Algiers (Mezzo Morto) ===
- 20 sailing ships
- 24 galleys
