= Jean Le Vacher =

French missionary and diplomat

Servant of God Jean Le Vacher CM
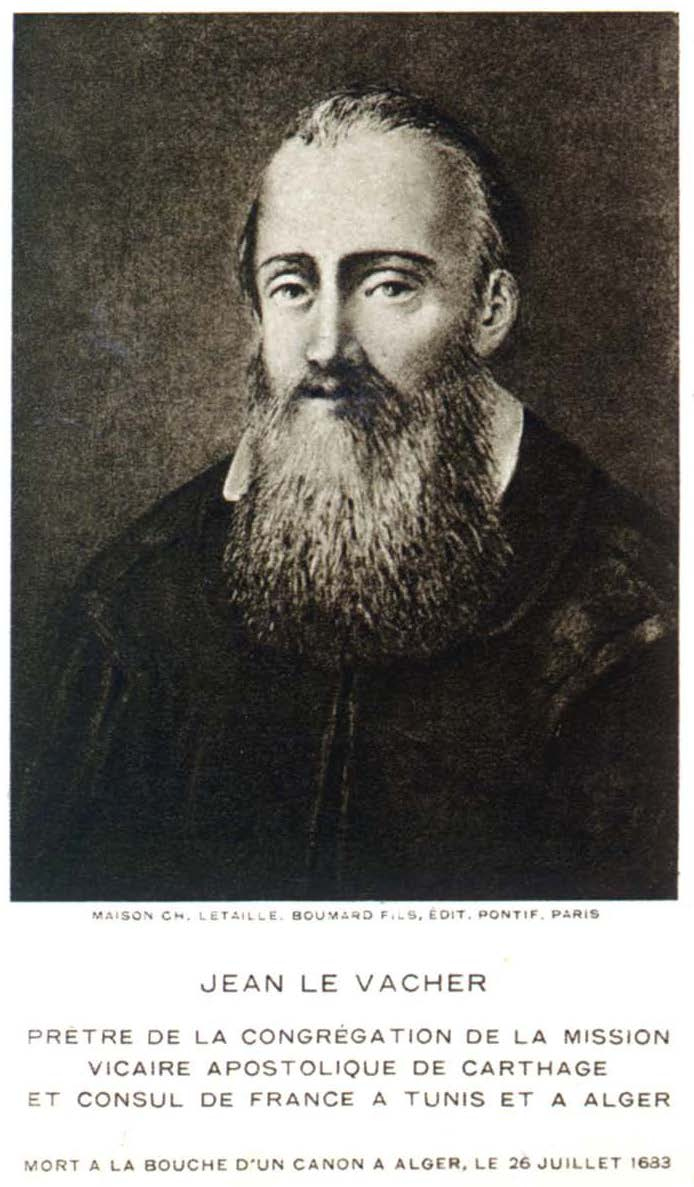
- Born: 15 March 1619; Écouen, France
- Died: 26 July 1683 (aged 64); Algiers, Algeria
- Occupations: Diplomat, missionary

Jean Le Vacher, CM (15 March 1619 – 26 July 1683) was a French Lazarist missionary and consul in Tunis and Algiers. He was killed by being attached to an Algerian cannon loaded with shrapnel that was fired when the French fleet bombarded Algiers. His cause for canonization was opened in 1923.

== Early years ==
Jean Le Vacher was born on 15 March 1619 in Écouen, France. His parents Philippe Le Vacher and Catherine Butefer had four boys and three girls by their marriage. Jean was the eldest. His younger brother Philippe was to also enter the Congregation of the Mission, commonly known as the Lazarites, and his youngest sister became a nun at the convent of Sainte-Marie. Jean Le Vacher was placed with a priest near Rouen who taught him the elements of Latin and instructed him in religion. He was then sent to Paris for his further studies.

Le Vacher became engaged to marry, but the two families could not agree on the terms of the marriage contract. He met Vincent de Paul, who persuaded him to join the Lazarists. Le Vacher spent three years with his brother Philippe at Bons-Enfants studying ecclesiastical sciences. On 5 October 1643 both brothers offered themselves to Vincent de Paul, and were accepted. They both took vows in 1646.

== Tunis ==
At the time, the Barbary states held many Christian slaves. Some converted to Islam, but others held onto their religion. A treaty was concluded by France with the Ottoman Porte that allowed the French to send a priest with their consuls. In November 1645 the priest Louis Guérin was sent to Tunis, and began providing spiritual comfort to the slaves. Vincent de Paul sent Le Vacher to Tunis in November 1647 to assist Guérin. He arrived during an epidemic of the plague. He did much to comfort people of all classes, including slaves, merchants and Turks, who held him in great esteem. He fell sick himself and was expected to die, but recovered.

In July 1648 the consul, L'Ange de Martin, became seriously ill. He sent for Le Vacher and asked him to take his place if he should die. Le Vacher refused, and the consul proposed to nominate one of the French merchants. However, they could not agree on a candidate. When the Bey was told of the problem, he also said that Le Vacher should become consul, and on the death of Martin he accepted this position. He was consul for five years while also acting as a missionary. Exhausted, Le Vacher won permission in 1653 to be relieved of his duties as consul and devoted himself solely to missionary work first in Tunis and then in Bizerte. He returned to Tunis, where he was again made consul, and where the Holy See named him Vicar Apostolic. Le Vacher was consul from 1648 until 1667, when he was succeeded by Jean Ambrozin.

== Algiers ==
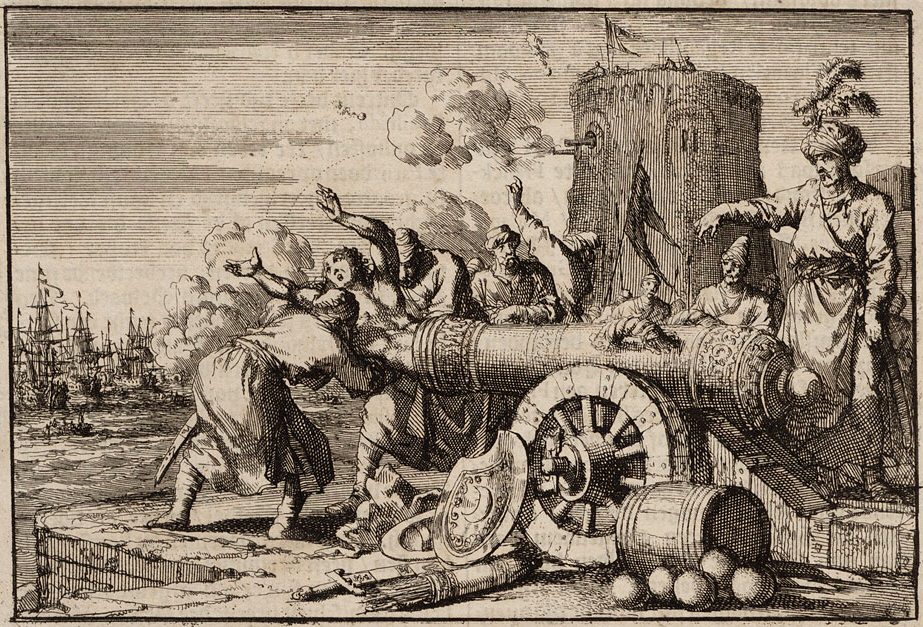
1698 Dutch engraving of Le Vacher's death

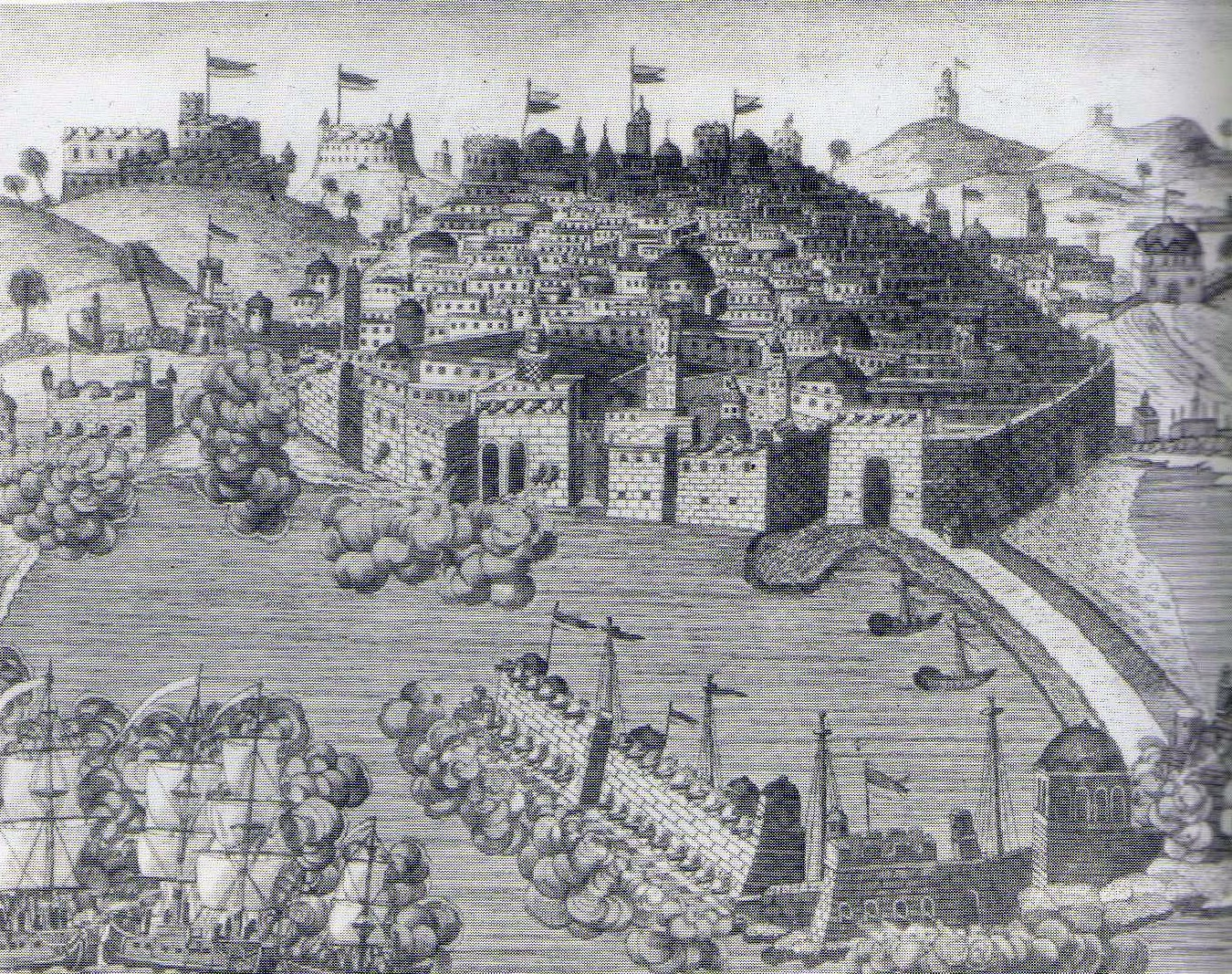
Bombardment of Algiers in 1682

Le Vacher returned to France and stayed for a while at the Priory of Saint-Lazare. In 1668 he was sent to Algiers, where he again had the dual roles of consul and missionary. He was appointed Consul of France at Algiers in 1676. On 4 September 1682, Admiral Abraham Duquesne arrived at Algiers to obtain the release of the French slaves held there. Le Vacher boarded the vice-admiral's ship, where he found Duquesne. He said he had been sent by the powers of the land, the Dey Mehemet Hadgi and the military chief Baba-Hassan, to find what Duquesne wanted. However, Dusquesne insisted on talking to a personal representative of the Dey. Duquesne continued to bombard Algiers from his galleys until 12 September 1682, when he judged that the sea would soon no longer be safe for galleys and decided to return to Toulon.

In July 1683, Duquesne again bombarded the town. The French fire destroyed houses, mosques and ships. There was a palace revolution. The people seized any remaining Frenchmen. Le Vacher was falsely accused of treason, and was attached to the mouth of a cannon called Baba Merzoug. (Note: Baba Merzoug was cast in Algiers in 1542 by a Venetian engineer, weighed twelve tons, was almost 7 metres (23 ft) long and had a range of 4.8 kilometres (3.0 mi). It was the most powerful in the Mediterranean. Le Vacher was blown from the muzzle in July 1683, and the French consul Piolle André was blown from the muzzle in 1688 when the Marshal Jean d'Estrées attacked Algiers. The gun became known as La Consulaire (the Consular). When the French colonized Algeria they took the cannon as a trophy in 1830, and converted it into a column that was erected in the Brest arsenal. After fifty years of independence from France, Algeria asked for the return of the cannon.) He was killed on 26 July 1683. Per the order of the usurper, known as Mezzomorto, he was tied to the mouth of a cannon with 22 other French residents and destroyed by shrapnel. This type of execution has been known as being blown from cannon.

== Veneration ==
A cause for Le Vacher's canonization was formally opened on 6 July 1923, granting him the title of Servant of God.
