= Bartolomeo Contarini (naval commander) =

- Battles / wars: Great Turkish War: Battle of Andros

Bartolomeo Contarini was a commander of the combined Venetian and Papal fleet at the Battle of Andros in 1696 during the Great Turkish War.

He subsequently commanded the Venetian fleet in the action of 6 July 1697.
