= Muhammad Trik =

Ruler of Algiers (d. 1682)

- Dey of Algiers
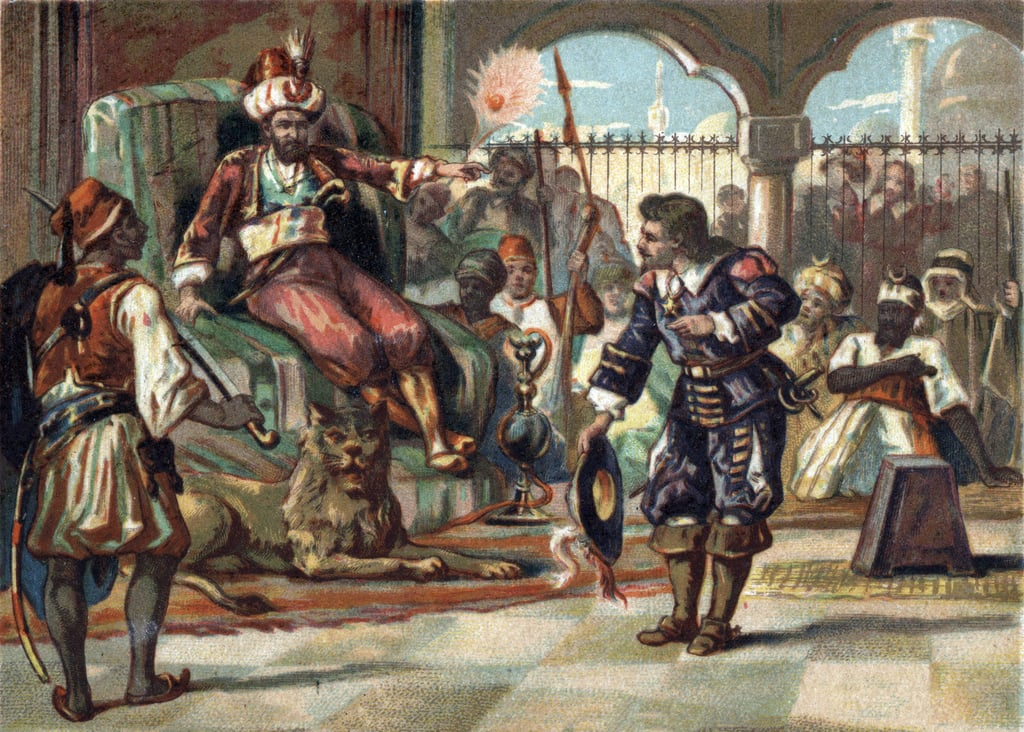
- The French captain of frigate, Pierre Porcon de La Barbinais, taken prisoner by the dey Mohammed Trik.

Admiral of Algiers
- Reign: 1621–1671
- Successor: Hussein Mezzomorto

1st Dey of Algiers
- Reign: 1671–1682
- Successor: Baba Hassan
- Born: Muhammad ben Mahmûd Trîk late 16th century Algiers
- Died: 1682; Tripoli
- Arabic: محمد بن محمود تريك
- Religion: Sunni Islam
- Military career
- Conflicts: Anglo-Algerian War (1677–1682)

Muhammad Trik was the seventh ruler and Dey of Algiers. He ruled eleven years as the first Dey of the Regency of Algiers.

== Rule ==
His father was a Dutch renegade.

He reduced Ottoman authority to a ceremonial role, and ousted the Janissary aghas with the help of the Raises.

In a report from 1676, he is noted to have been married to a former slave concubine, described as a "cunning covetous English woman, who would sell her soule for a Bribe", with whom the English viewed it as "chargeable to bee kept in her favour… for Countrysake".

In 1677, he declared war against England and attacked English shipping.

== See also ==
- List of governors and rulers of the Regency of Algiers
