= Mezzomorto =

Ottoman-Spanish military and political official

Mezzo Morto Hüseyin Pasha
- Dey of Algiers
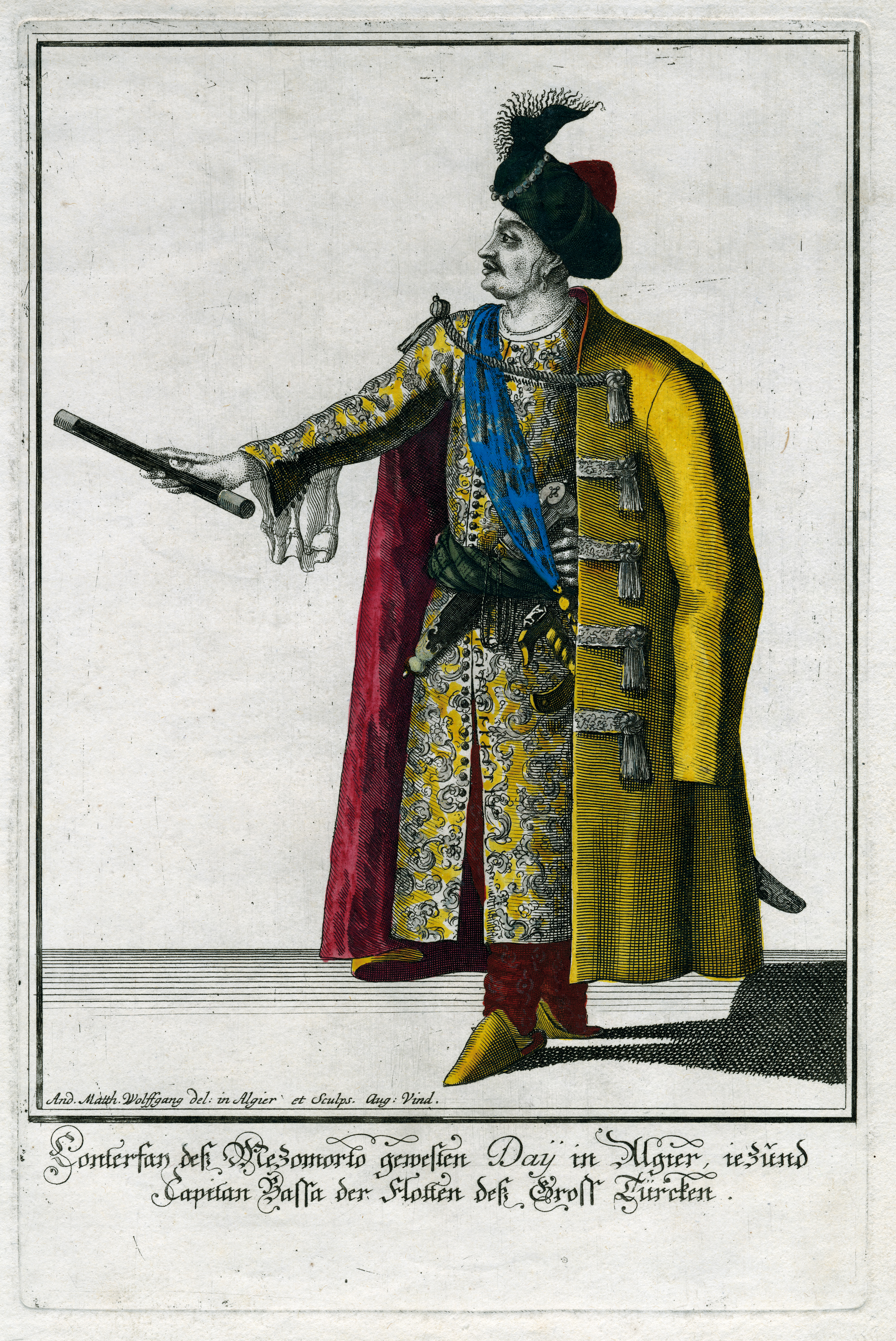
- Mezzomorto as a Grand Admiral.

Admiral of Algiers
- Reign: 1671–1683
- Predecessor: Mohammed Trik
- Successor: Hadj Ahmed Chabane

3rd Dey of Algiers
- Reign: 1683–1688
- Predecessor: Baba Hassan
- Successor: Hadj Ahmed Chabane

Kapudan Pasha
- Reign: 1695–1701
- Born: Barbary Coast
- Died: 1701; Chios
- Burial: 1701; Chios
- Country: Regency of Algiers
- Religion: Islam
- Occupation: Captain then Dey
- Military career
- Conflicts: Franco-Algerian war (1681–1688); Morean War; Battle of the Oinousses Islands; Battle of Zeytinburnu; Battle of Andros (1696)

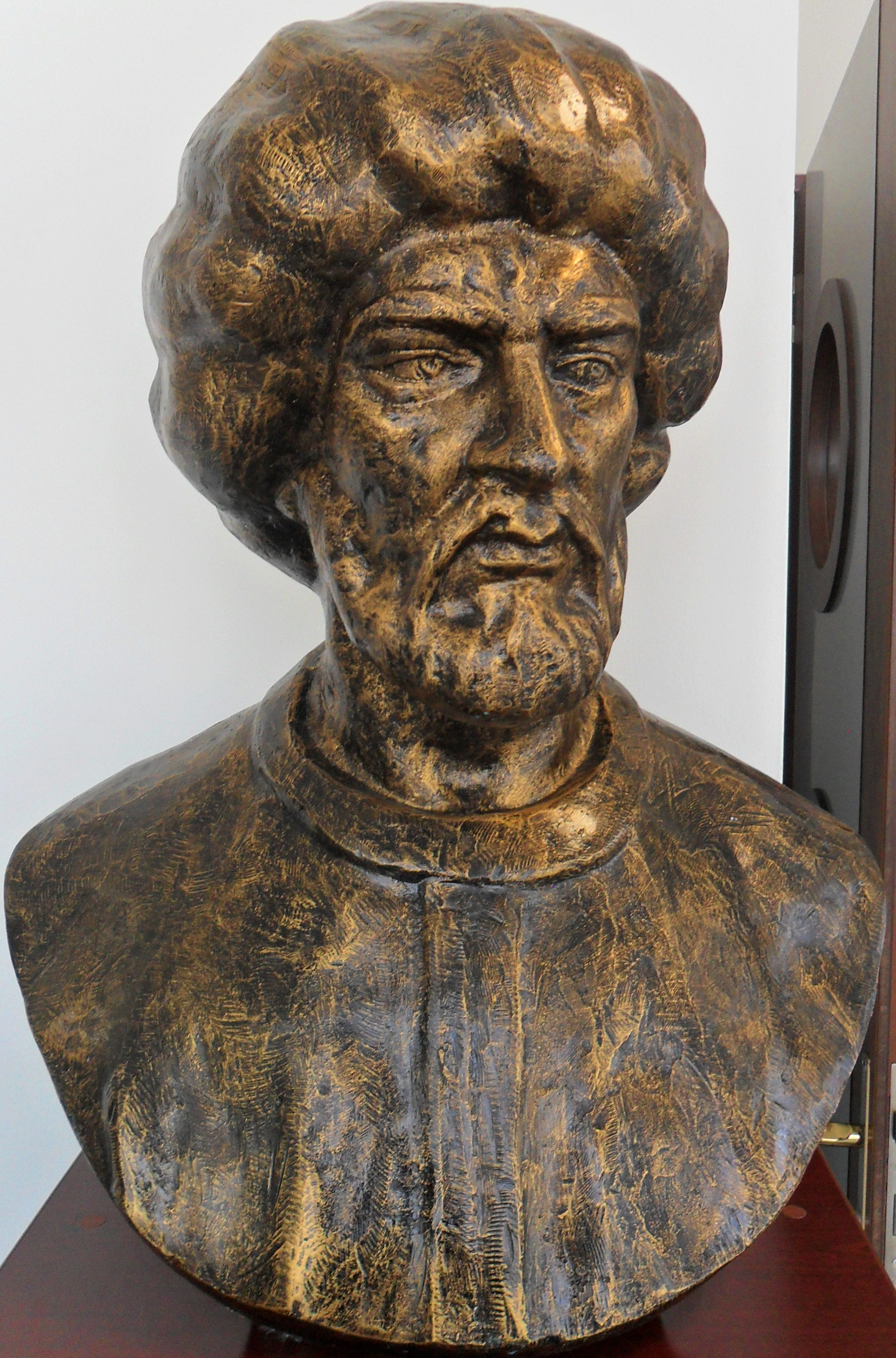
Bust of Mezzo Morto Hüseyin Pasha in the Mersin Naval Museum.

Hussein Mezzomorto (d. 1701) or Hajji Husain Mezzomorto was an Algerian corsair, dey of Algiers, and Grand Admiral (Kapudan Pasha) of the Ottoman Navy. His epithet mezzomorto is the Italian for "half-dead" and was acquired during a fight with the Spaniards, when he was gravely injured.

He exercised various political functions within the Ottoman Empire and the Barbary states, distinguishing himself particularly among the rais of Algiers and eventually becoming the Dey of Algiers. He served as the Kapudan Pasha from 1695 to 1701.

== Biography ==
Mezzo morto pasha was a renegade convert from Christianity, of Mallorcan or Calabrian origins. Mezzomorto was mentioned as a captain in 1674. He rose to prominence during the French attacks on Algiers in the early 1680s. He was present for Abraham Duquesne's 1682 bombardment and commanded a fleet of corsairs the next year. The dey of Algiers Baba Hassan handed him over as a hostage to the French, but Mezzomorto persuaded the French admiral to send him back to shore, where he led an insurrection against Baba Hassan, killed him, and took over as dey of Algiers. He then opened fire on the French fleet, forcing Duquesne to raise his blockade. During the 1684 bombardment, he signed a "100 year" treaty with Duquesne. However, the French fleet bombarded Algiers again in 1688, and Mezzomorto retaliated with attacks on the French coast.

As dey of Algiers, Mezzomorto took part in the Morean War between the Ottomans and Venetians in 1686. He then commanded the fleet in the Danube in 1690, and afterward in the Black Sea. The Venetian threat to the Ottomans' Aegean possessions led to Mezzomorto's appointment as sanjak-bey of Rhodes in 1691.

He was held captive by the Venetians for many years, knew them intimately, and swore revenge the day he was freed.

Distinguishing himself during the reconquest of Chios in early 1695, he was promoted to Kapudan Pasha, acquiring lordship over the Province of the Islands. His primary goal was to expel the Venetians from the Aegean. He defeated a Venetian fleet off Lesbos in September 1695, preventing it from reaching Chios. He commanded at the Battle of Andros in 1696, and on July 5, 1697, defeated a Venetian fleet off Tenedos. On September 3 he scored another victory, this time off Andros. A battle off Lesbos on September 21, 1698, was interpreted as a victory by each side.

With the support of Sultan Mustafa II, Mezzomorto began a reform of the navy. His reforms were compiled into a book of regulations, the Kannunname, published shortly before his death in 1701. He was buried on Chios.

== See also ==
- List of governors and rulers of the Regency of Algiers
