= List of mosques in Tunisia =

This is a list of mosques in Tunisia.

According to the data by the Ministry of Religious Affairs as of December 2015, there were 5,470 mosques in Tunisia, among which 4,299 are Jami Masjids which conduct Friday Prayer and 1,171 are smaller mosques. The city of Sfax has highest number of mosques, with 418 Jama Masjids and 88 smaller mosques. The city of Djerba contains 380 mosques, among which 20 are underground mosques.

== List of mosques in Tunisia ==
Name	Image	Location	Year (CE)	Notes
Great Mosque of Kairouan الجامع الكبير قيروان		Kairouan	670	One of the oldest places of worship in the Islamic world; located in a UNESCO World Heritage Site.
Al-Zaytuna Mosque مسجد الزيتون		Tunis	698	Exact dete is disputed; yet believed to be 79 AH (698/699 CE)
Bu Ftata Mosque مسجد بؤ فتاتة		Sousse	838-841	
Great Mosque of Sfax الجامع الكبير بسفاكس		Sfax	c. 849	Notable for its Aghlabid minaret and its unusually decorated eastern façade.
Great Mosque of Sousse الجامع الكبير بسوسة		Sousse	851	Commissioned by Abu al-‘Abbas Muhammad al-Aghlabi; completed in the Aghlabid style.
Mosque of Muhammad ibn Khairun مسجد ابن خيرون		Kairouan	866	Commissioned in 252 AH (866/867 CE) during the Aghlabid era by Muhammad ibn Khairun, the minaret was added in 844 AH (1440/1441 CE), during the Hafsid period.
Great Mosque of Monastir الجامع الكبير بمنستير		Monastir	9th century	The absence of a dome surmounting the mihrab is rare in medieval Ifriqiyan architecture.
Great Mosque of Mahdia الجامع الكبير بمهدية		Mahdia	916	Commissioned by the Fatimid caliph Abdallah al-Mahdi.
Great Mosque of Béja الجامع الكبير بباجة		Béja	944	Built by the Fatimids on the site of an old Christian basilica.
Bled el Hadhar Mosque مسجد بلد الحضر		Tozeur	1149	
Ksar Mosque مسجد قصر		Tunis	12th century	
Kasbah Mosque مسجد قصبة		Tunis	1230	
Al Haoua Mosque مسجد الهواء		Tunis	1252	
Bab Bhar Mosque مسجد باب بحار		Tunis	1282	
Djemaa Fadhloun جمامع فضلون		Djerba	14th century	
Al Haliq Mosque مسجد حليق		Tunis	14th century	
Tabbanine Mosque مسجد التبانين		Tunis	1487	
Sidi Elyes Mosque جامع سيدي إلياس		Sfax	before the 15th century	
Mosque of the Strangers مسجد الاجانب		Houmt El Souk	15th century	
Mosque of the Turks مسجد الأتراك		Houmt El Souk	16th century	
Great Mosque of Testour الجامع الكبير بتستور		Testour	1631	
Youssef Dey Mosque مسجد يوسف دي		Tunis	1631	
Hammouda Pacha Mosque مسجد حمودة باشا		Tunis	1655	
The Bey's Mosque جامع مراد باي		Béja	1675	
Al Bey Mosque مسجد الباي		Kairouan	1683	
Sidi Mahrez Mosque مسجد سيدي محرز		Tunis	1692	
Mosque of the Barber مسجد الحلاق		Kairouan	17th century	
Sidi Bou Makhlouf Mosque مسجد سيدي بؤ مخلوف		Le Kef	17th century	
Bab Jazira Mosque مسجد باب جزيرة		Tunis	1710	
El Jedid Mosque مسجد الجديد		Tunis	1726	
Mustapha Hamza Mosque مسجد مسطفى حمزة الخضر		Mahdia	1778	
Al Malek Mosque مسجد الملك		Kairouan	18th century	
Saheb Ettabaâ Mosque مسجد صاحب الطابع		Tunis	1814	
Slimane Hamza Mosque مسجد سليمان حمزة		Mahdia	1826	
Bardo Mosque مسجد الباردو		Le Bardo	19th century	
Bourgiba Mosque جامع برقويبة		Monastir	1963	
Malik ibn Anas Mosque مسجد مالك ابن أنس		Carthage	2003	
Douar el Chott Mosque مسجد دوار الشط		Carthage		
Dougga Mosque مسجد دوغا		Dougga		
El Ahmadi Mosque مسجد الاحمدي		La Marsa		
El Hilali Mosque مسجد الهلالي		Kairouan		
El May Mosque مسجد الماي		Djerba		
El Rabba Mosque مسجد الرباء		Sousse		
Ennasr Mosque مسجد النصر		Ghomrassen		
Ennour Mosque مسجد النور		Monastir		
Essaidia Mosque مسجد السعيدية		Le Bardo		
Great Mosque of Gafsa الجامع الكبير بغفسا		Gafsa		
Great Mosque of Hammamet الجامع الكبير بحمامة		Hammamet		
Ibn Abbas Mosque مسجد ابن عباس		Djerba		
Jarah Mosque مسجد جراح		Gabès		
Ksar Hadada Mosque مسجد قصر حدد		Ksar Hadada		
Great Mosque of Medjez el Bab الجامع الكبير بمجز الباب		Béja		
El Lawlib Mosque مسجد اللولب		Kairouan		
Great Mosque of Nabeul الجامع الكبير نباول		Nabeul		
Negra Mosque مسجد نغر		Kairouan		
Mosque of the Ouled Majed مسجد الوالد مجد		Degache		
Sedouikech Underground Mosque مسجد سدويكش		Djerba		
Mosque of the Seven Sleepers مسجد الرقود السبع		Chenini		
Sidi Abdel Jaoued Mosque مسجد سيدي عبدالجواد		Jugurtha Tableland		
Sidi Achor Mosque مسجد سيدي أشور		Nabeul		
Sidi Amor Kammoun Mosque مسجد سيدي عمر فنون		Sfax		
Sidi Bou Said Mosque مسجد سيدي بو سعيد		Sidi Bou Said		
Sidi Mtir Mosque مسجد سيدي متير		Mahdia		
Sidi Reis Mosque مسجد سيدي رئيس		Sfax		
Zawiya al-Zouqaq زوية الزوقاق		Tunis		

== See also ==
- Islam in Tunisia
- List of mosques in Africa
- List of mosques in Tunis
