= Great Mosque of Monastir =

Mosque in Monastir, Tunisia

- الجامع الكبير بالمنستير
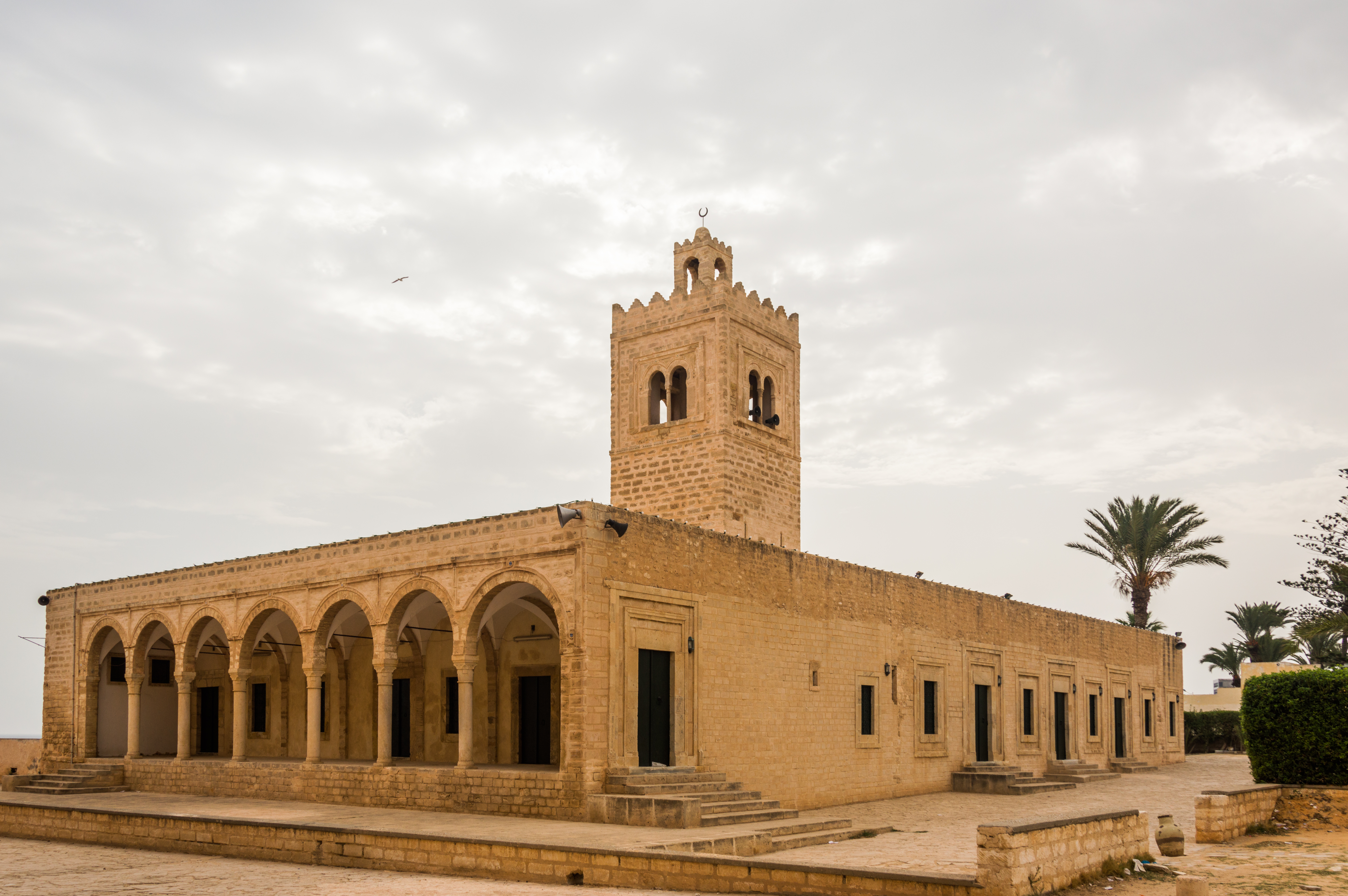

Religion
- Affiliation: Islam
- Ecclesiastical or organisational status: Mosque
- Status: Active

Location
- Location: Monastir
- Country: Tunisia
- Interactive map of Great Mosque of Monastir
- Coordinates: 35°40′12″N 10°53′33″E

Architecture
- Type: Mosque
- Completed: 854 CE
- Minaret: 1

The Great Mosque of Monastir (Arabic: الجامع الكبير بالمنستير) is a historical mosque located in Monastir, Tunisia. Located on the outskirts of the city overlooking the sea, near the Ribat of Monastir, the mosque is characterized by the high exterior facades built of stone, frames surrounding the windows and doors, as well as arches that extend along the mihrab.

== History and architecture ==
The present mosque, which has undergone enlargements and additions over the centuries, includes a prayer room and a minaret, and doesn't have a sahn. This has been the result of four distinct phases of construction.

In the first phase dating from the 9th century, the hall was built covered with arched vaults and supported by the semicircular arches resting on cruciform pillars. In the course of the 11th century, an enlargement of the room to the south-east was accompanied by the addition of columns surmounted by arched vaults. It is from this period that the development of the mihrab began. Decorated with Zirid-style motifs, the mihrab consists of a semicylindrical niche with a rib-shaped vault. It is decorated with Kufic inscriptions and floral moldings. In the Hafsid era, expansion work continued with the construction of a square-based minaret and the addition of two naves in the north-western part. The completion of the mosque took place during the 18th century with the addition of a hallway along one of the exterior facades.

One of the peculiarities of the Great Mosque of Monastir consists in the absence of a dome surmounting the mihrab, which is rather rare in medieval Ifriqiyan architecture.

== See also ==
- Islam in Tunisia
- List of mosques in Tunisia
- List of the oldest mosques
