= Great Mosque of Testour =

Mosque in Testour, Beja, Tunisia

- الجامع الكبير بتستور
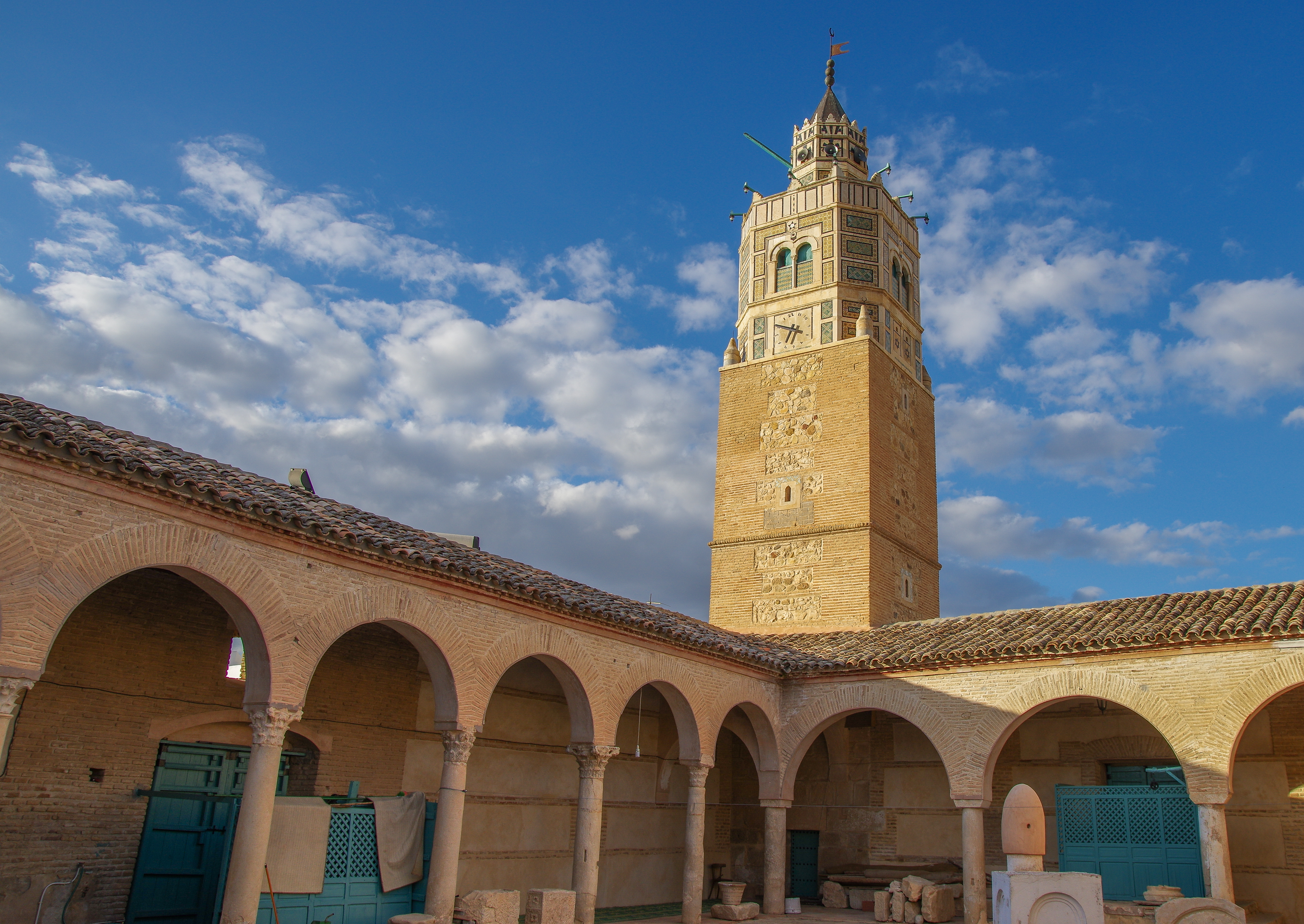

Religion
- Affiliation: Islam
- Status: Active

Location
- Location: Testour ,Beja Governorate
- Country: Tunisia
- Interactive map of Great Mosque of Testour
- Coordinates: 36°33′14″N 09°26′49″E

Architecture
- Architect: Muhammad Tagharinu (patron)
- Type: Mosque
- Style: Moorish
- Completed: 1631

Specifications
- Capacity: 1,000 worshippers
- Dome: 1
- Minaret: 1
- Minaret height: 23 m
- Materials: limestone, Spanish sand, marble, porcelain (mihrab)

The Great Mosque of Testour (Arabic: الجامع الكبير بتستور) is a mosque located in the city of Testour in Beja Governorate, Tunisia. It is 76 km from the capital Tunis, in the center of the old city. It embodies the Andalusian architecture, especially its minaret, which features Andalusian style inscriptions and architectural elements. The height of the minaret is 23 meters and it is an octagonal shape. The facade of the minaret is opened with small double windows decorated with glazed inscriptions and a mechanical clock at the top. Its appearance resembles the Aragonese bell towers in northern Spain. The prayer hall, in addition to the sahn located in the center of the mosque, can accommodate up to 1000 worshipers. The construction of the mosque used limestone, Spanish sand and marble in addition to colored porcelain and tiles used in the construction of the mihrab. The mosque dates back to 1631, and its patron is Muhammad Tigharinu an immigrant of Andalusian origin who settled at Testour in 1609.

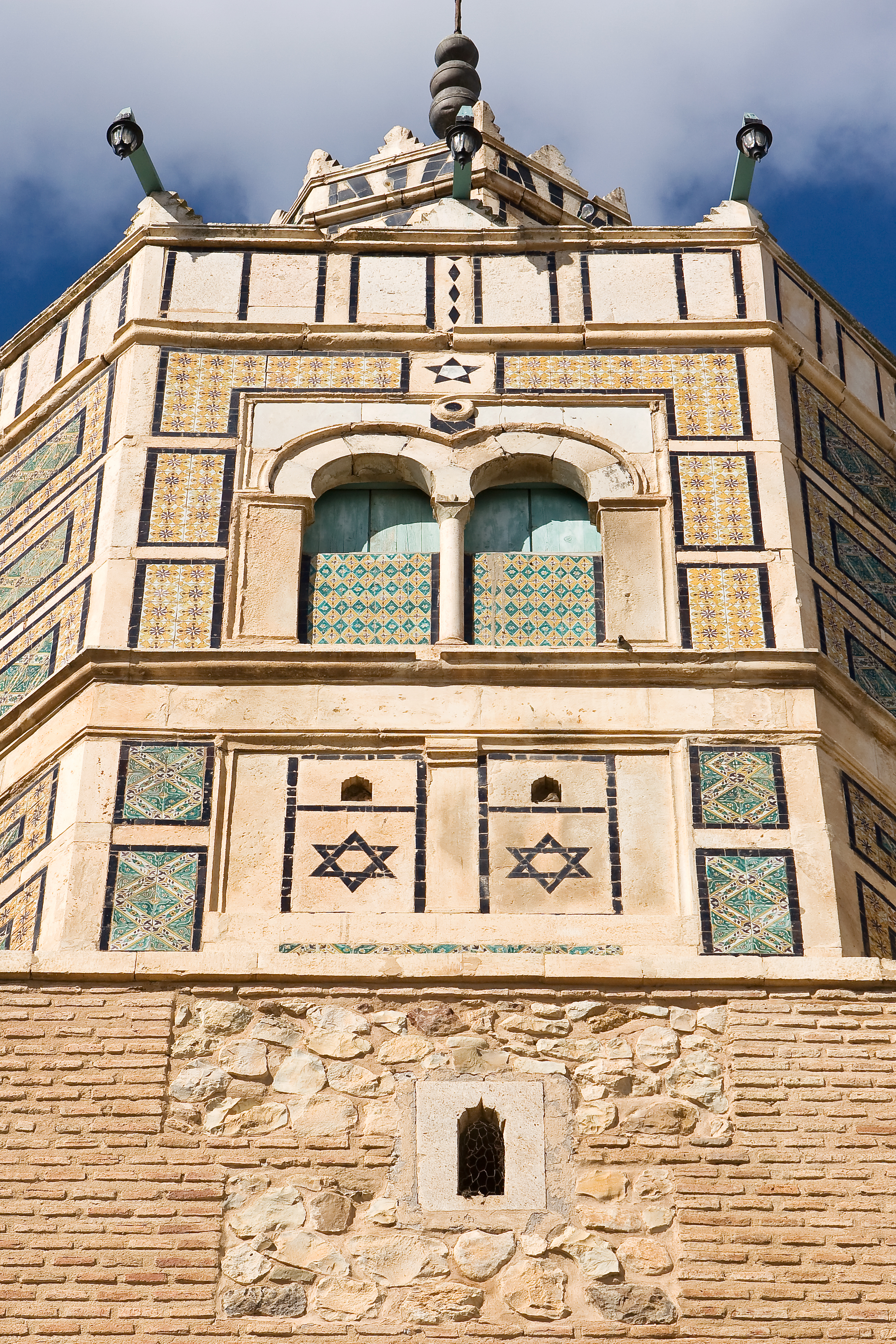
Detail of the minaret with the Muslim Seal of Solomon

== See also ==
- List of mosques in Tunisia
