= Hanafi Mosque of Bourguiba =

Mosque in Monastir, Tunisia

- جامع بورقيبة
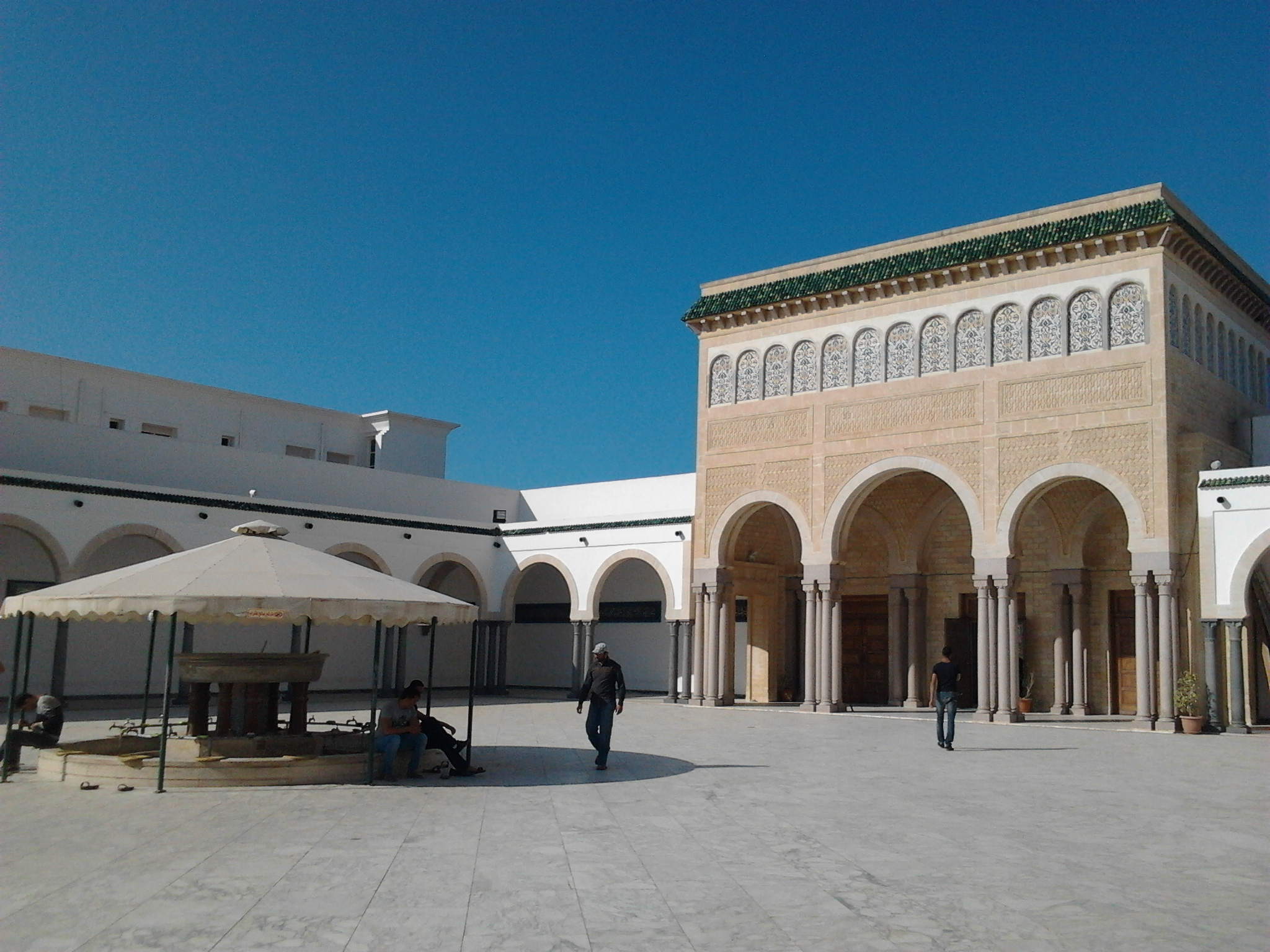
- Hanafi Mosque of Bourguiba (2018)

Religion
- Affiliation: Islam
- Branch/tradition: Sunni

Location
- Location: Monastir, Tunisia
- Interactive map of Hanafi Mosque of Bourguiba
- Coordinates: 35.7743848°N 10.8305025°E

Architecture
- Type: Mosque
- Founder: Taieb Bouzguenda
- Established: 1963; 63 years ago
- Capacity: 1,000 worshippers

The Hanafi Mosque of Bourguiba (Arabic: جامع بورقيبة) is a Tunisian Hanafi mosque located in Monastir and dedicated to the first president of Tunisia, Habib Bourguiba.

== History ==
The mosque was built in 1963 by Taieb Bouzguenda.

== Architecture ==
The mosque is designed in a traditional architectural style based on that of the Hammouda Pacha Mosque of Tunis. The prayer hall can accommodate up to a thousand people. Its mihrab, situated under a semi-dome, is covered by a half arch decorated with a golden mosaic. The columns' arches are made of pink marble.

== See also ==
- List of mosques in Tunisia

== Gallery ==
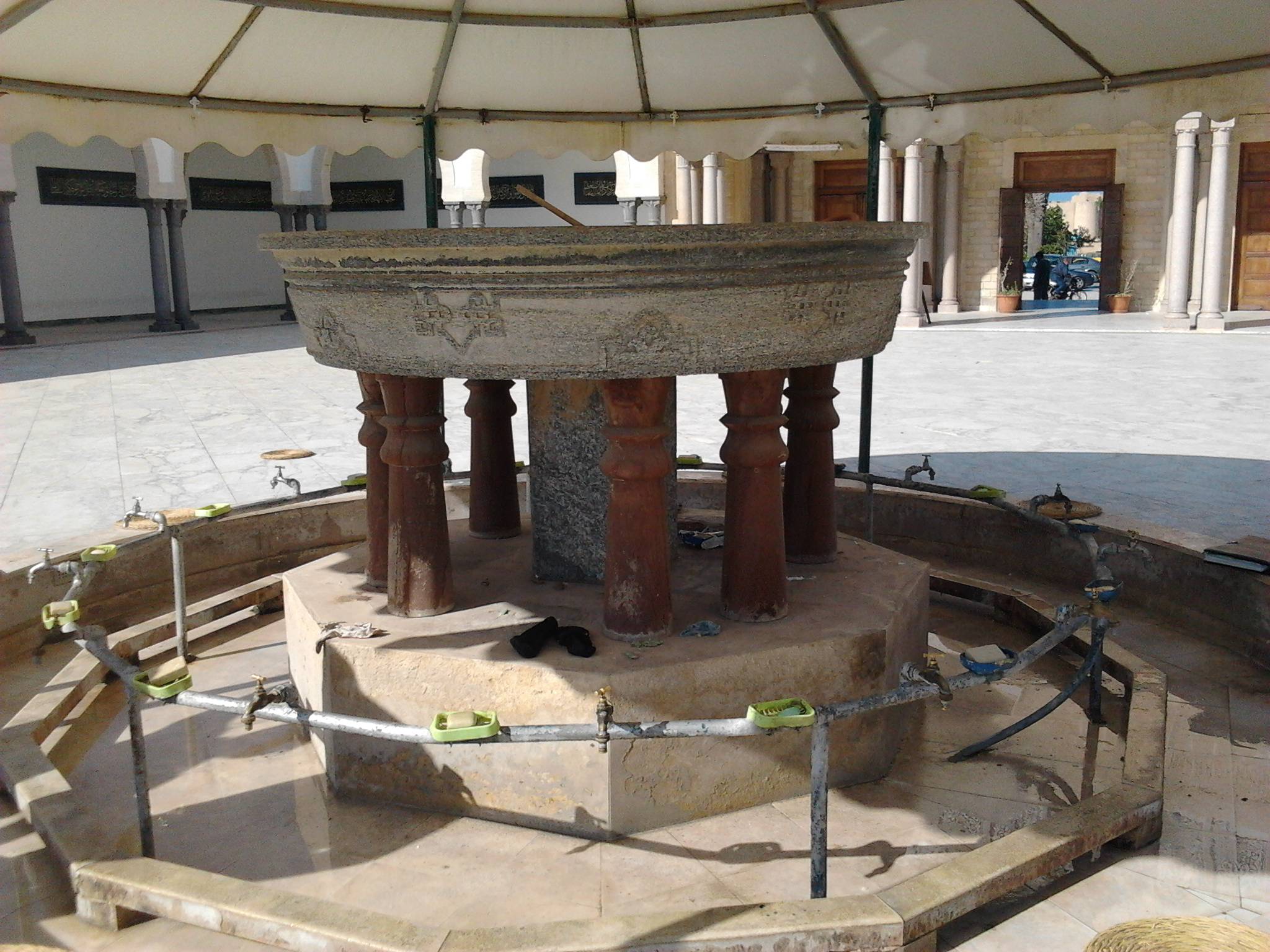
Basin for ablutions in the courtyard

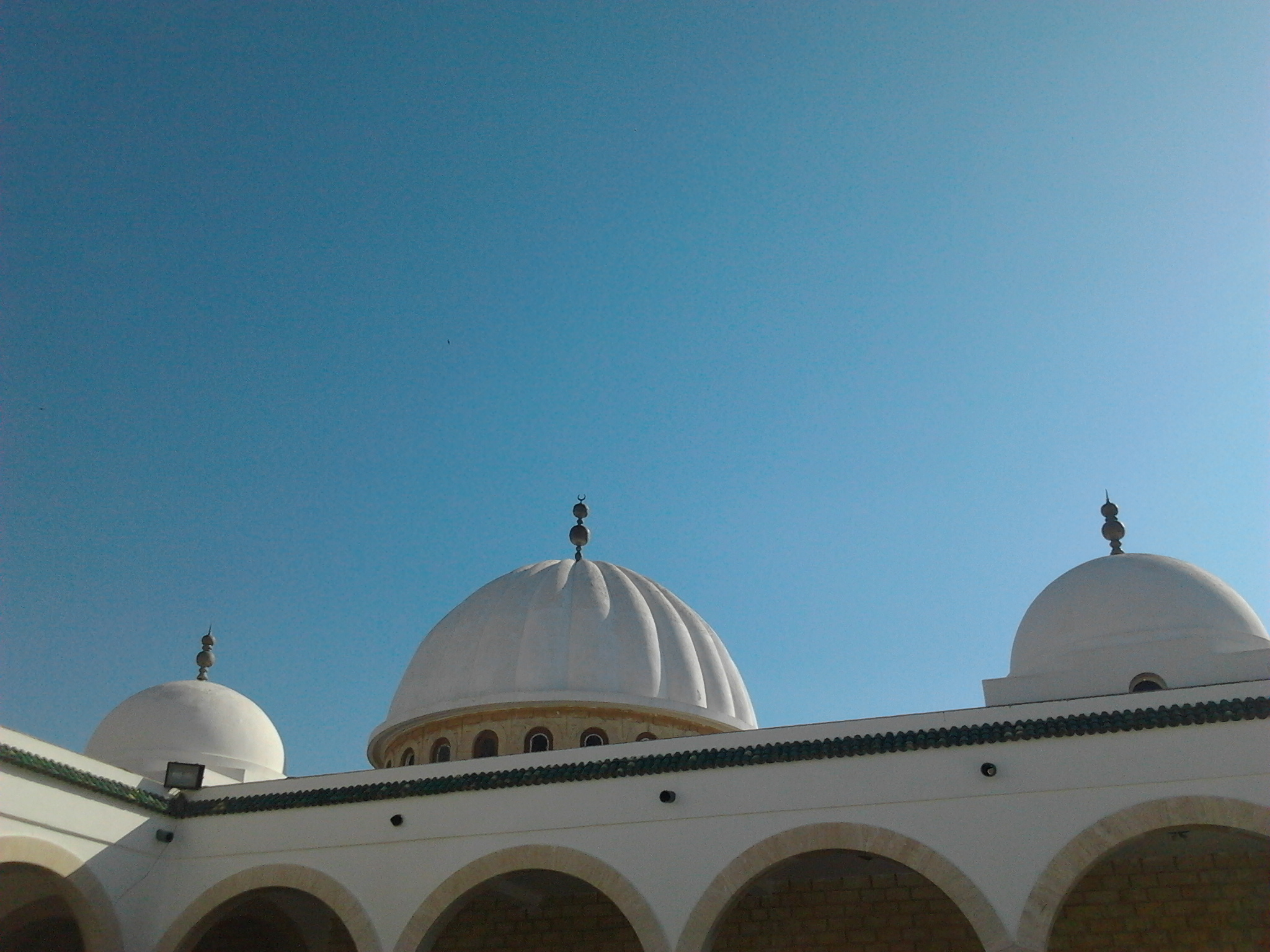
Exterior view of the domes

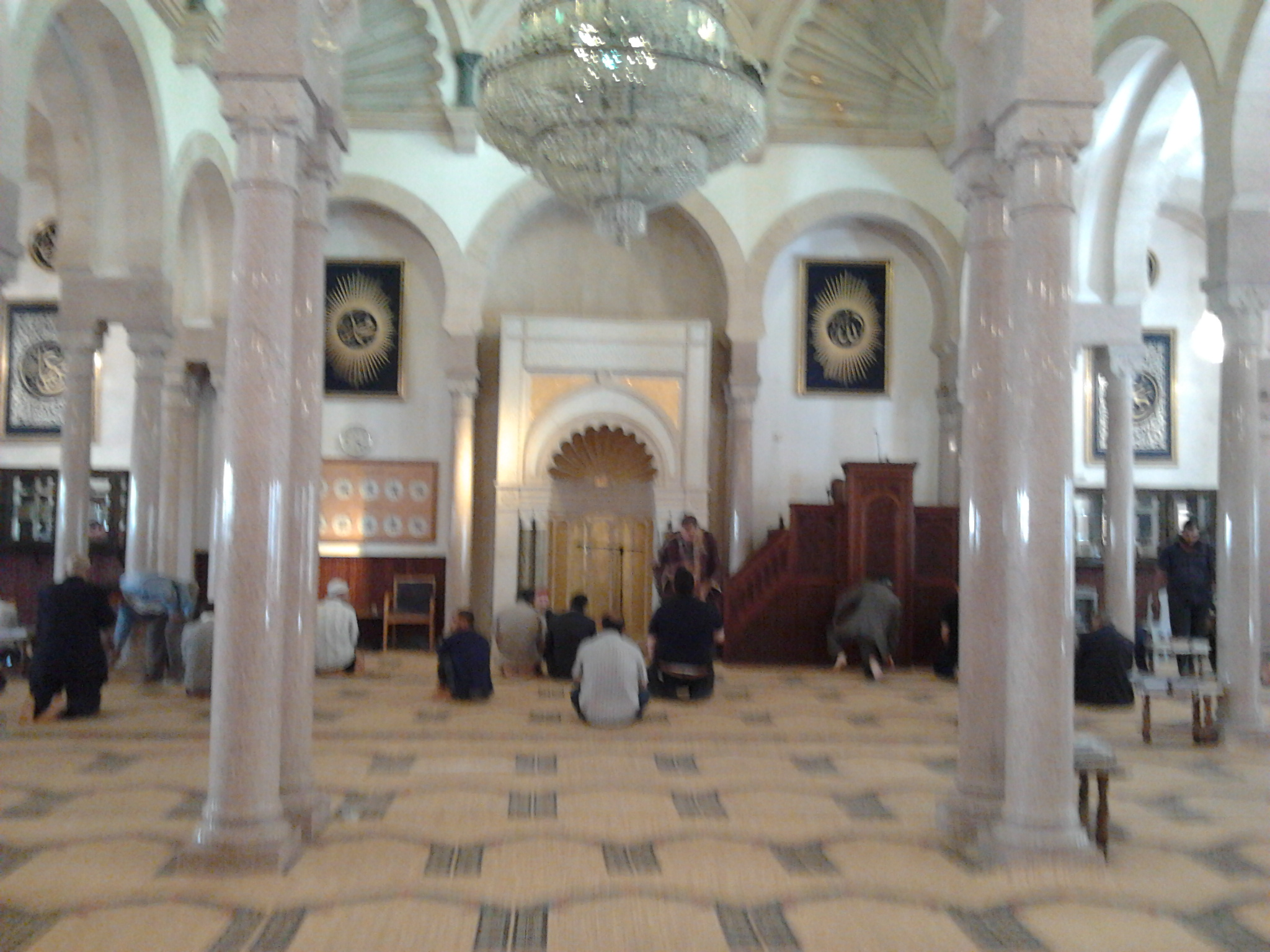
Prayer room

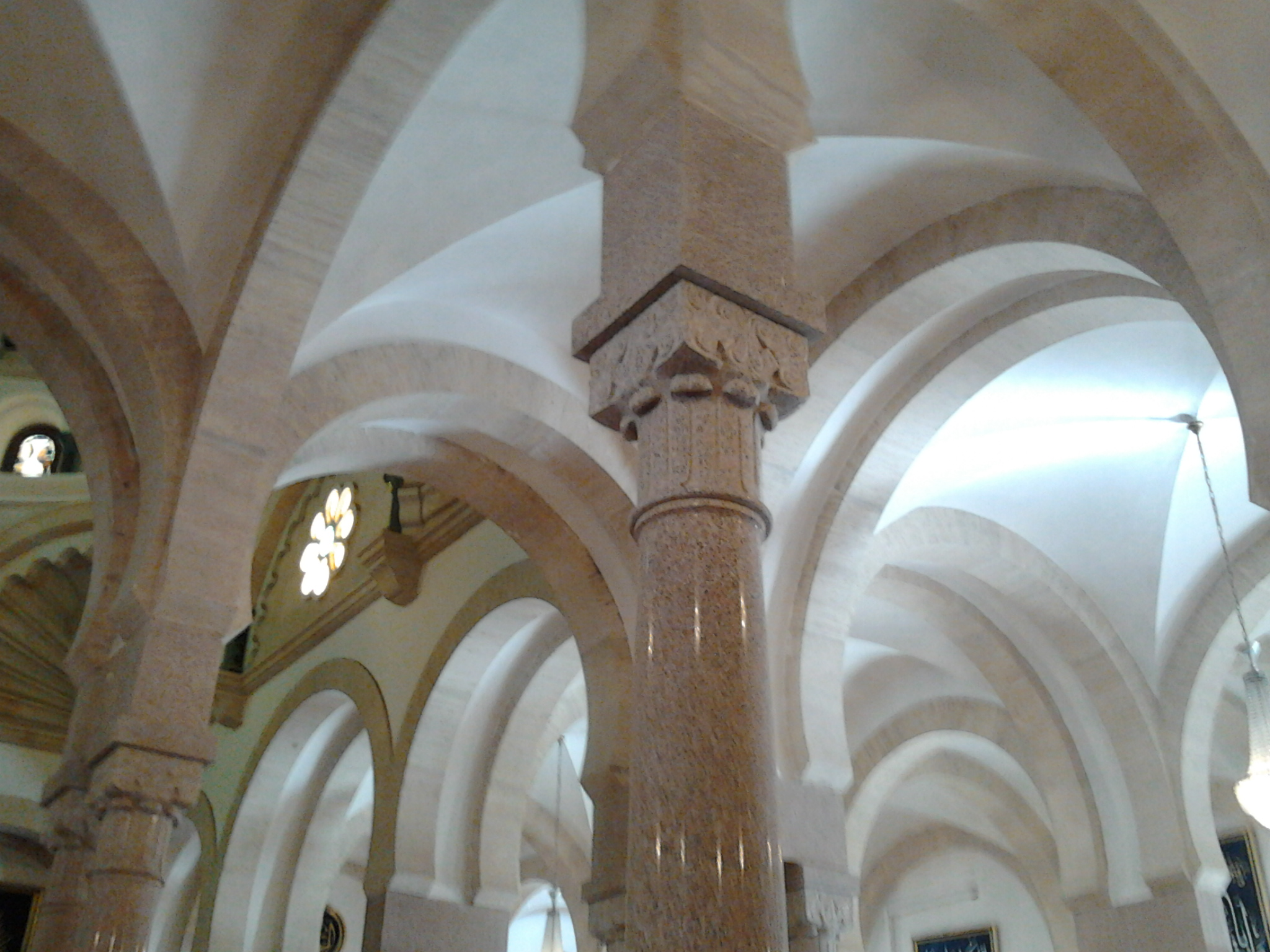
Bows and pink marble columns of the prayer room

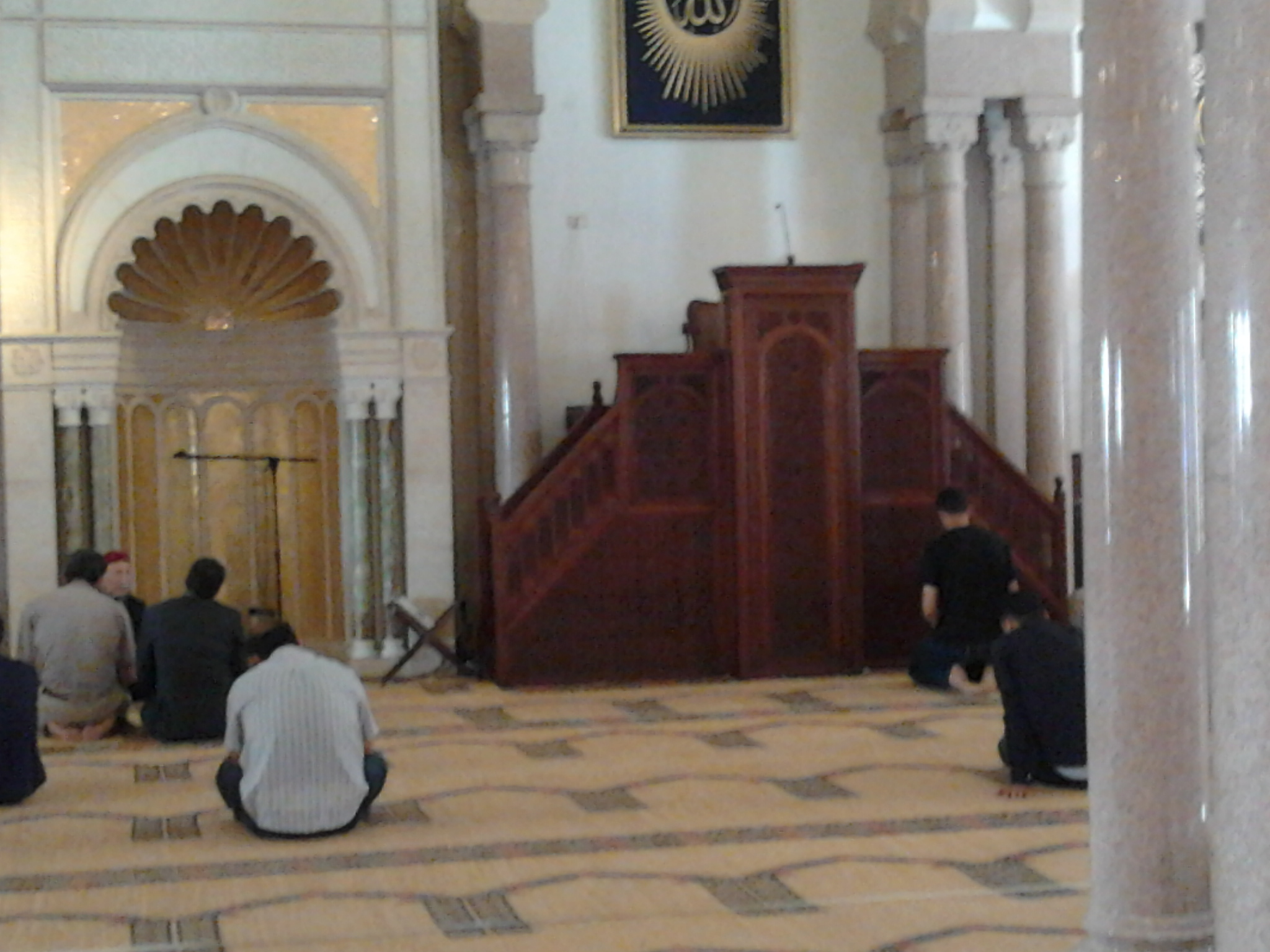
View of the mihrab and the minbar
