= Mosque of the Turks =

Mosque in Djerba, Tunisia

- جامع الترك
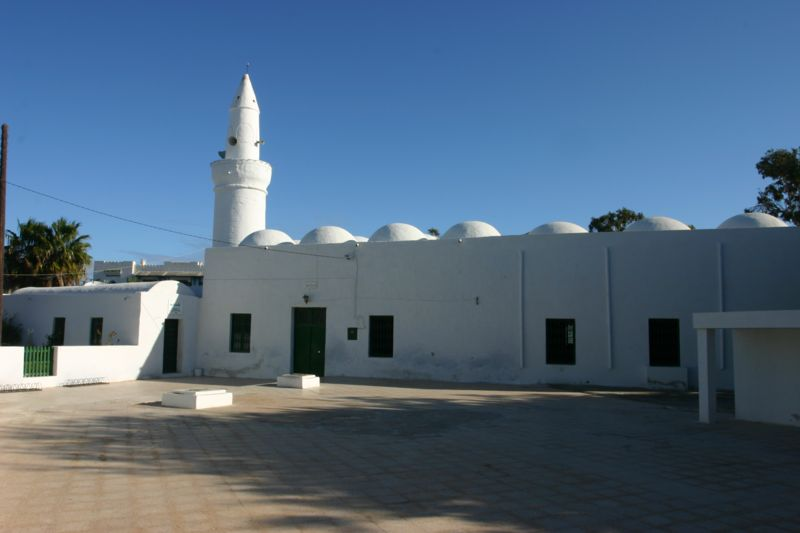

- Location within Tunisia

Religion
- Affiliation: Islam

Location
- Location: Djerba, Tunisia
- Coordinates: 33°52′41.4″N 10°51′33.2″E

Architecture
- Minaret: 1

The Mosque of the Turks (Arabic: جامع الترك), also known as Jemaa ettrouk, is a Tunisian historical mosque located in the center of Houmt Essouk in the island of Djerba.

== Location ==
The mosque is located in Houmt Essouk, in front of the cultural center Ferid Ghazi and behind Saint Joseph Church, in what used to be the Maltese neighborhood.

== History ==
It was built during the 16th century following the orders of caïd Ghazi Mustapha Bey. It was restored many times and eventually classified as a national historical monument.

== Architecture ==
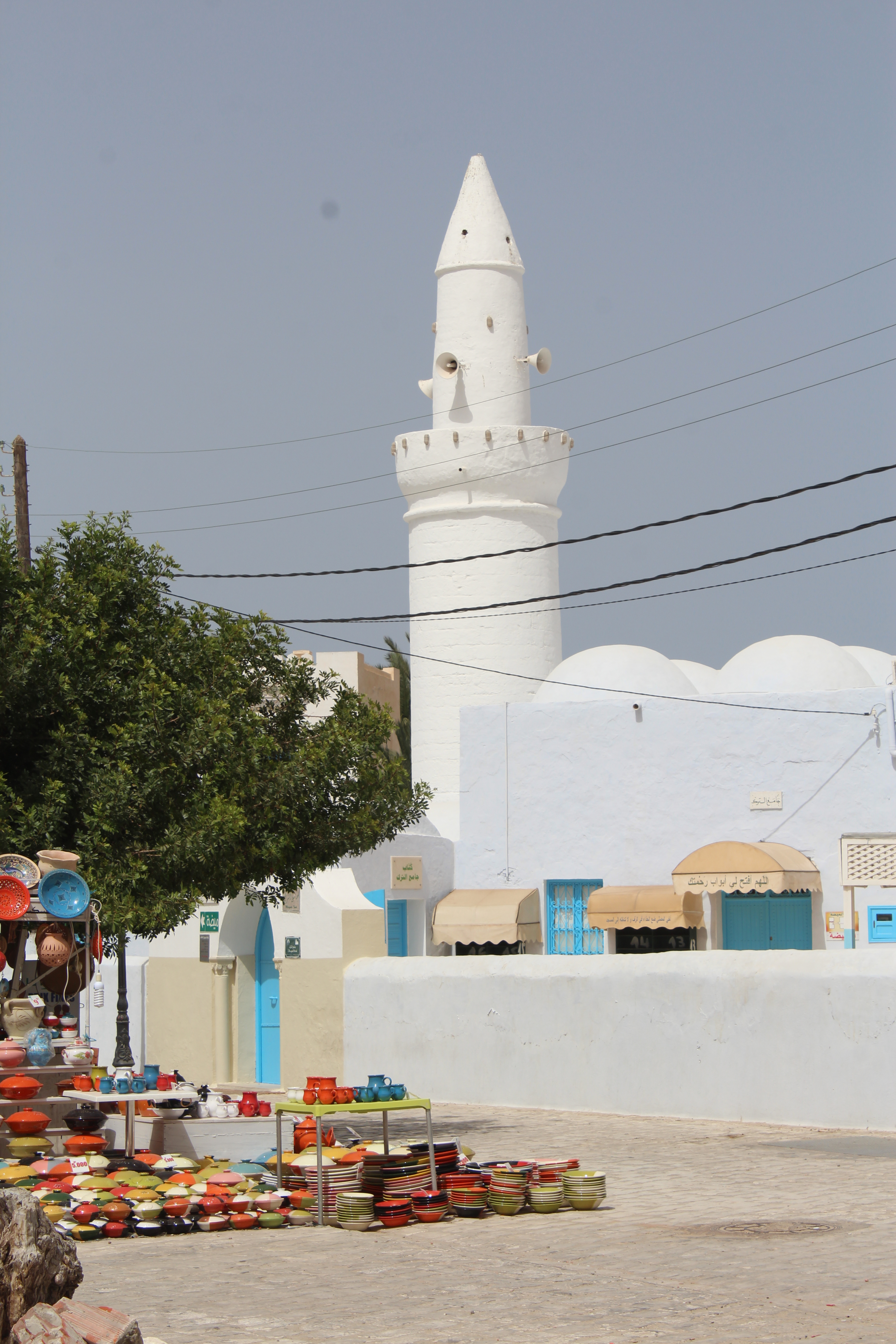
The minaret of the mosque

The monument is small in size in comparison to other mosques. It has a sober architecture with white walls and a unique minaret. It has a big courtyard and large cistern to collect rainwater.

== Rite ==
In the beginning, the mosque was the only one that followed the hanafi rite, a rite of the royal family, the court and some Turkish families on the island. Later, this was converted to the maliki rite.

== Gallery ==
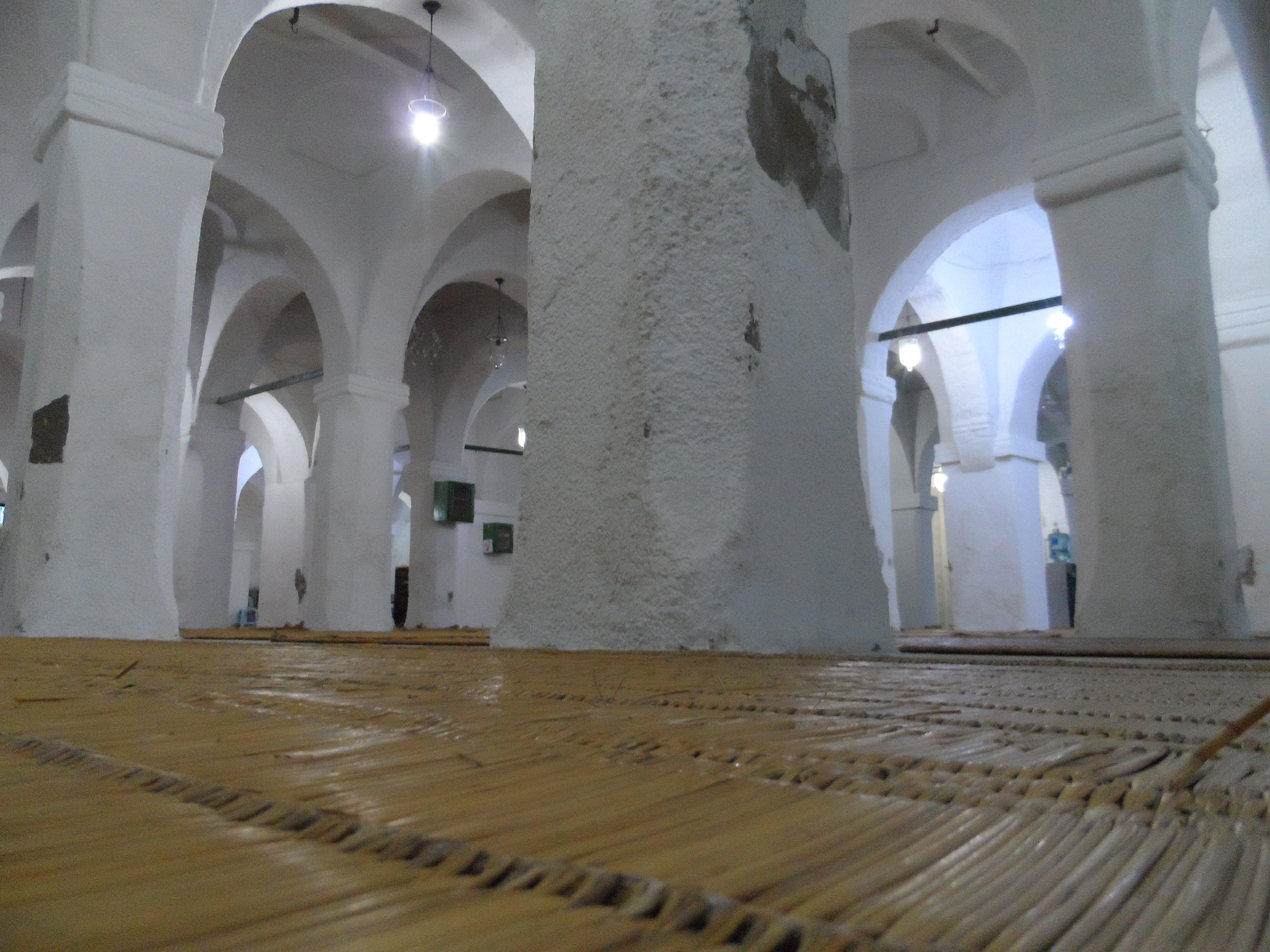
Prayer room

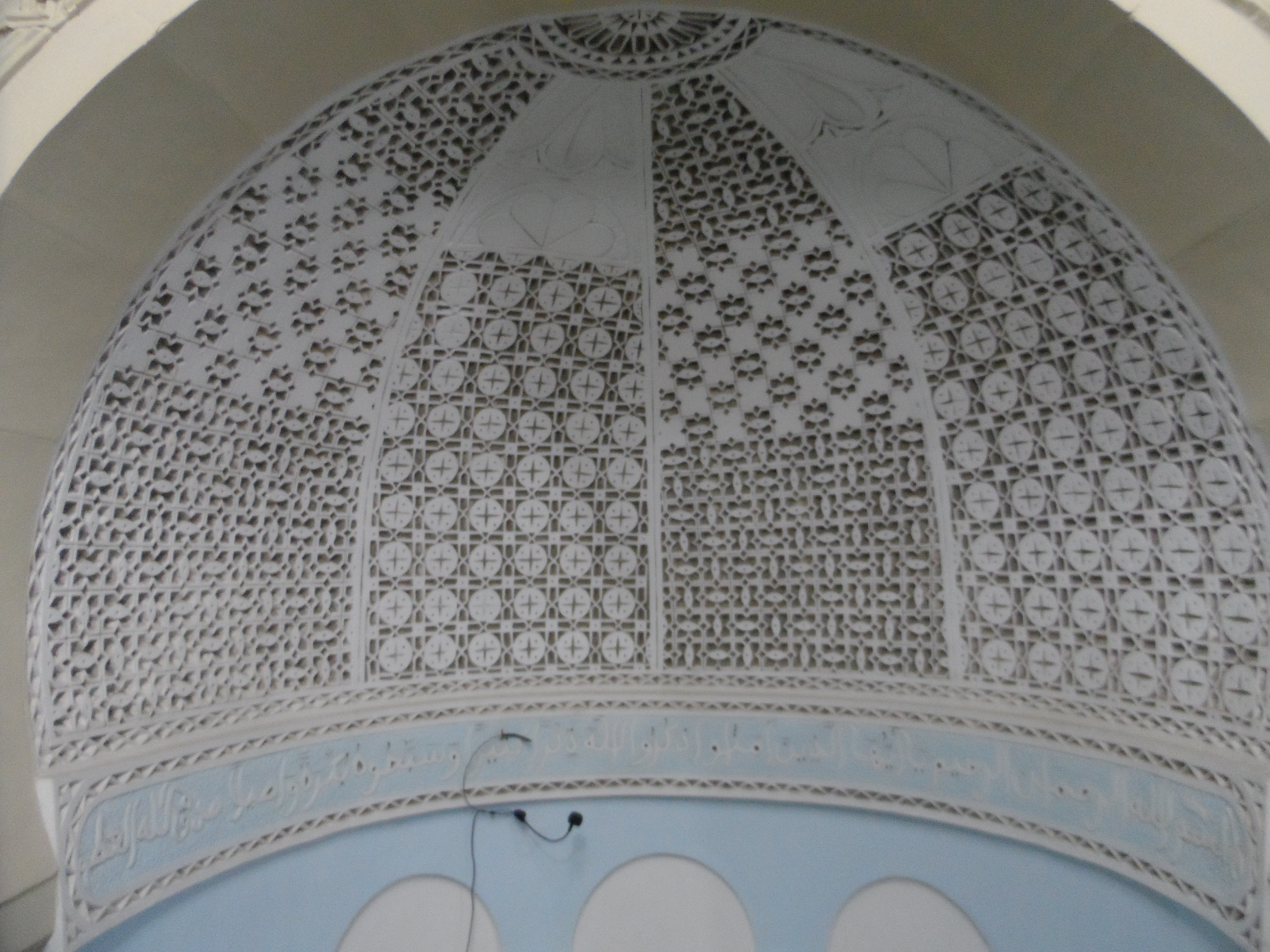
Decoration of the mihrab

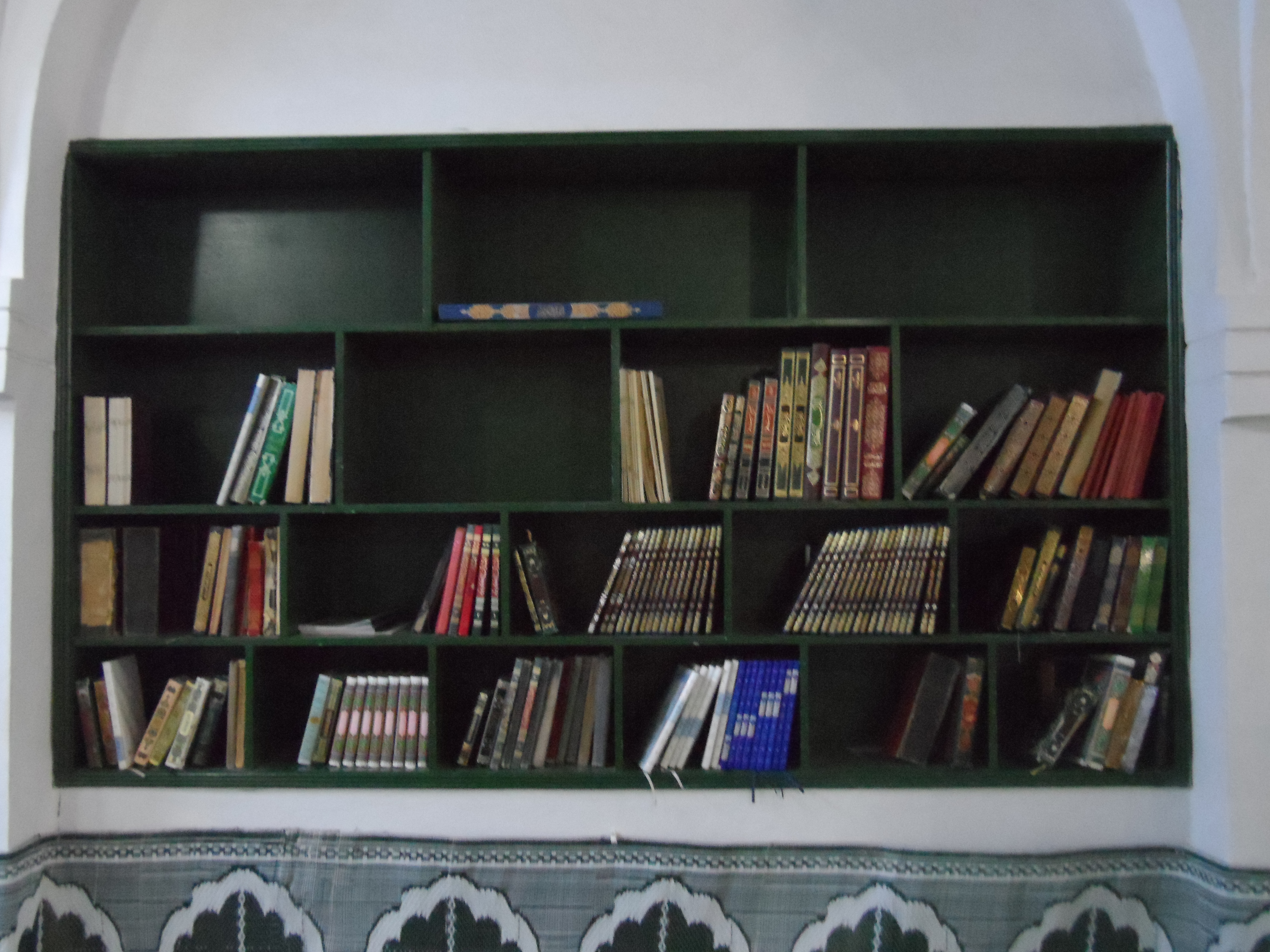
Library of the mosque

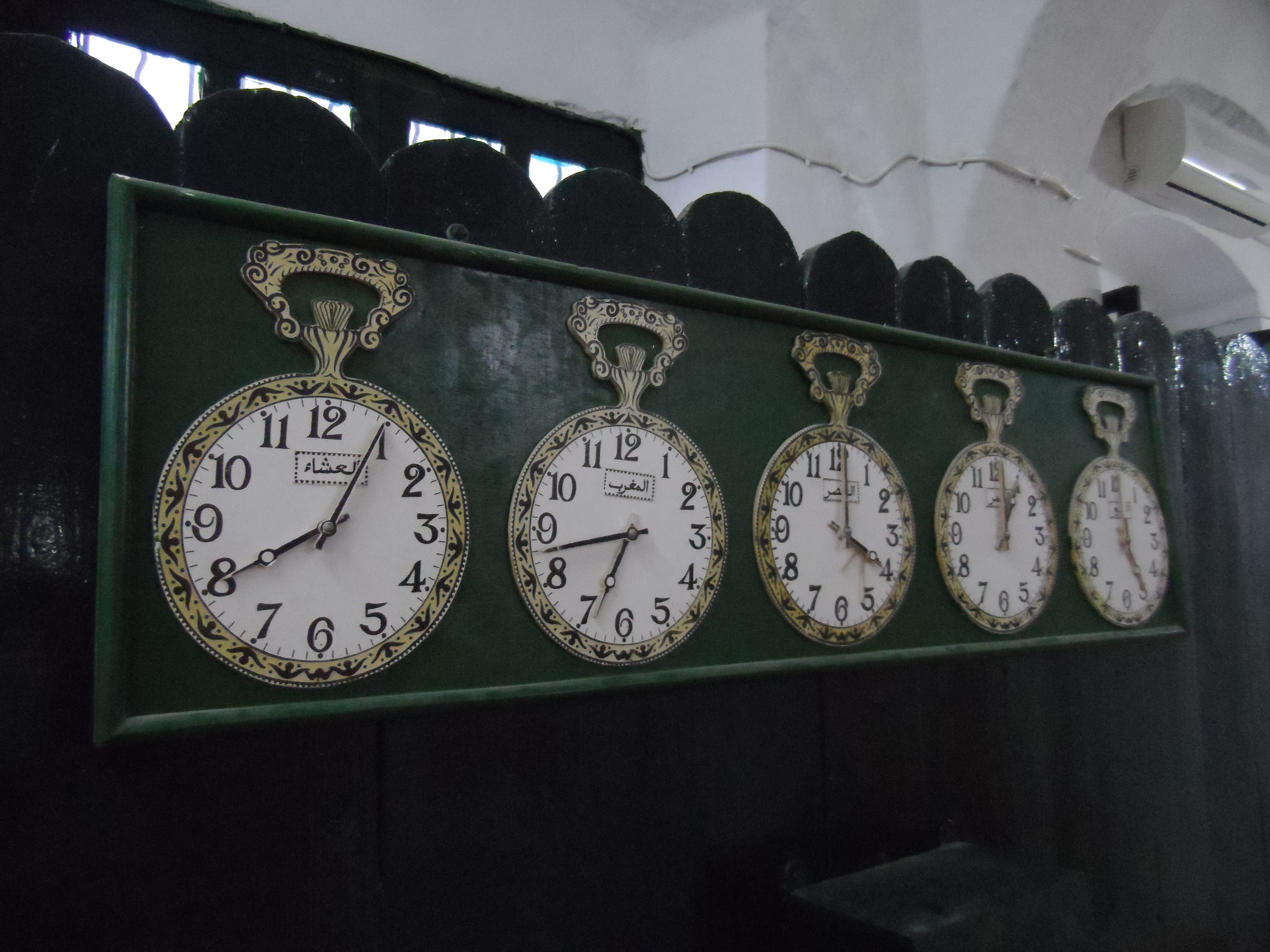
clocks for the prayer times
