= Testour =

Testour تستور
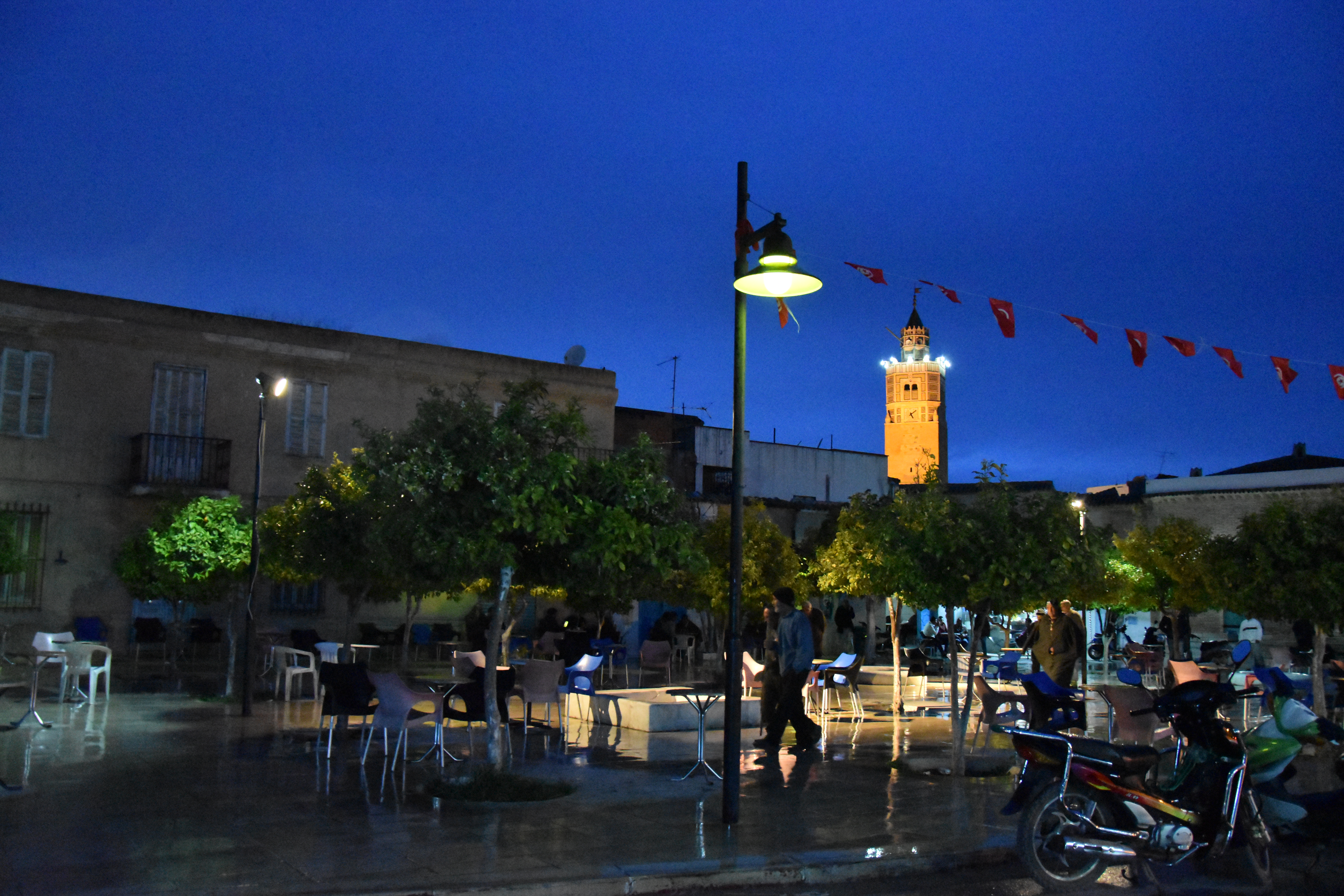
- Public square with Great Mosque of Testour in the back

- Location in Tunisia
- Coordinates: 36°33′N 9°27′E
- Country: Tunisia
- Governorate: Beja Governorate

Government
  - Mayor: Mohamed ben Bechir Feriani

Population (2014)
  - Total: 13,397
- Time zone: UTC1 (CET)

Testour (Arabic: تستور tīstūr) is a town located in the north of Tunisia. The town is perched on the hills of Medjerda Valley, 20 km (12 mi) south-west of Medjez-el-Bab, the crossroads between Tunis, Béja, and the north of Tunisia. It was known during the Roman period, as Tichilla, which means the green grass as it is situated in the mouth of Siliana valley. It was rebuilt in the 1500s by Muslim and Jewish refugees from Andalusia who gave it a distinctive character in building and layout. Today it is a popular pilgrimage for Jews who visit Rabbi Fraji Chawat's tomb.

The city host an international festival of Malouf and traditional Maghrebi music since 1967.

== Twin towns – sister cities ==
Testour is twinned with:

- Chefchaouen, Morocco
- Serpa, Portugal
- Gibellina, Italy
