= Al Bey Mosque =

Mosque in Kairouan, Tunisia

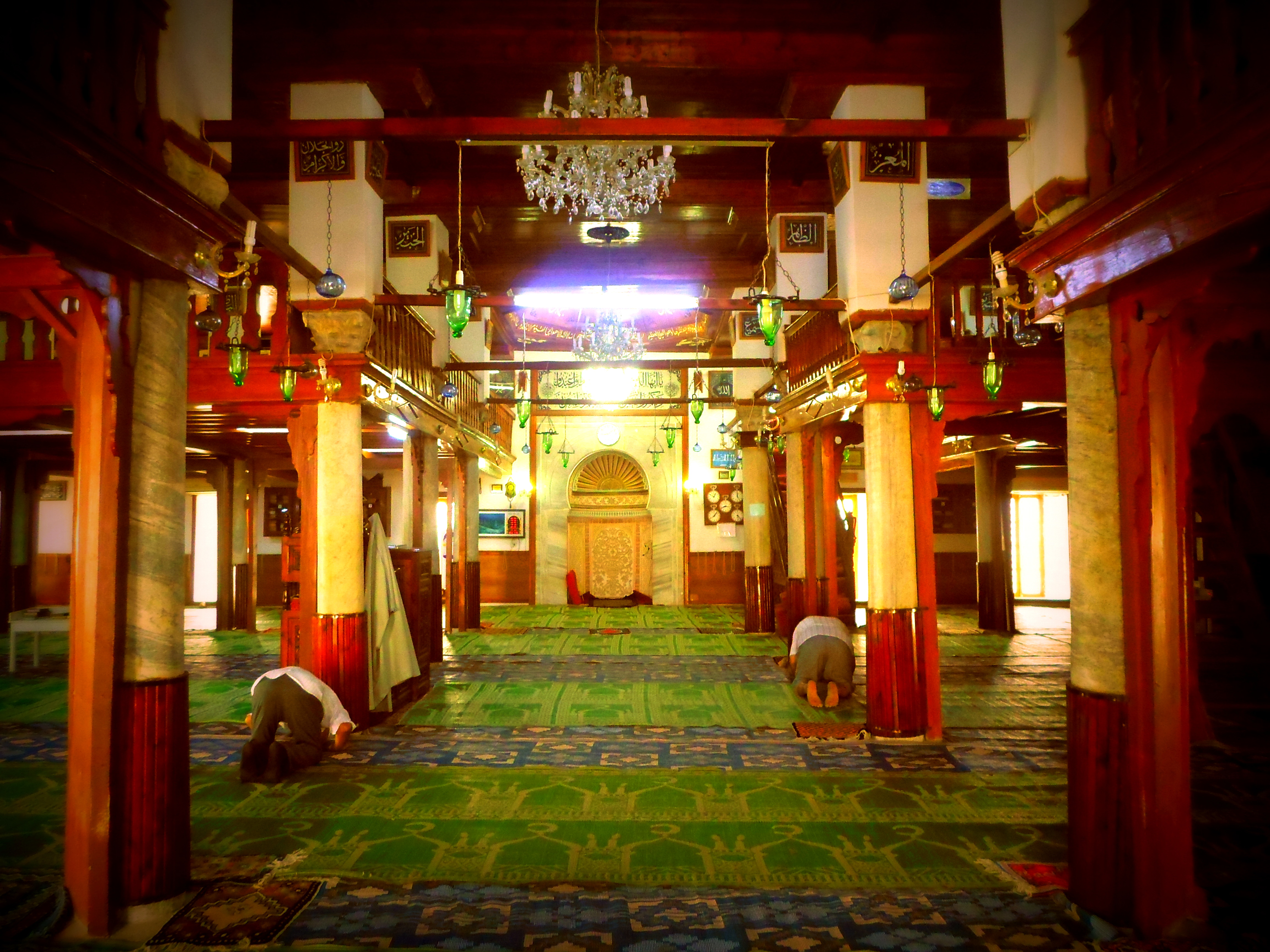
- Arches and minaret

Religion
- Affiliation: Islam
- District: Medina
- Province: Tunis
- Ecclesiastical or organizational status: Mosque

Location
- Location: Kairouan, Tunisia
- Interactive map of Al Bey Mosque
- Coordinates: 35°40′34.356″N 10°6′1.620″E

Architecture
- Type: Mosque
- Completed: 1683
- Minaret: 1

The Al Bey Mosque (Arabic: مسجد الباي) is a mosque located in the medina of Kairouan, Tunisia. Built around 1094 AH (1683), it was constructed by Muradid bey Mohamed Bey for the Hanafi community of Kairouan during a conflict with his brother Ali Bey.

== Architecture ==
The mosque, built over the souks, has an irregular plan and consists of a main prayer hall, three courtyards, a minaret, and an additional prayer hall for women. Access to the building is through three staircases, the most significant of which is located on Balhouen Street, opposite the Al Malek Mosque, leading to one of the courtyards.

The main prayer hall, with a square plan, occupies the southern part of the building and measures approximately 20 x 20 meters. Its wooden ceiling rests on thirty ancient columns. At the intersection of the main nave and the bay along the qibla wall, in front of the mihrab, there is a dome in the shape of a pyramid. The mihrab is decorated with carved stucco and set within a marble frame.

In the southwest corner of the northern courtyard stands a square-based minaret, consisting of a tower decorated with blind niches and crowned by a lantern. The western gallery of the same courtyard houses a rectangular prayer hall reserved exclusively for women.

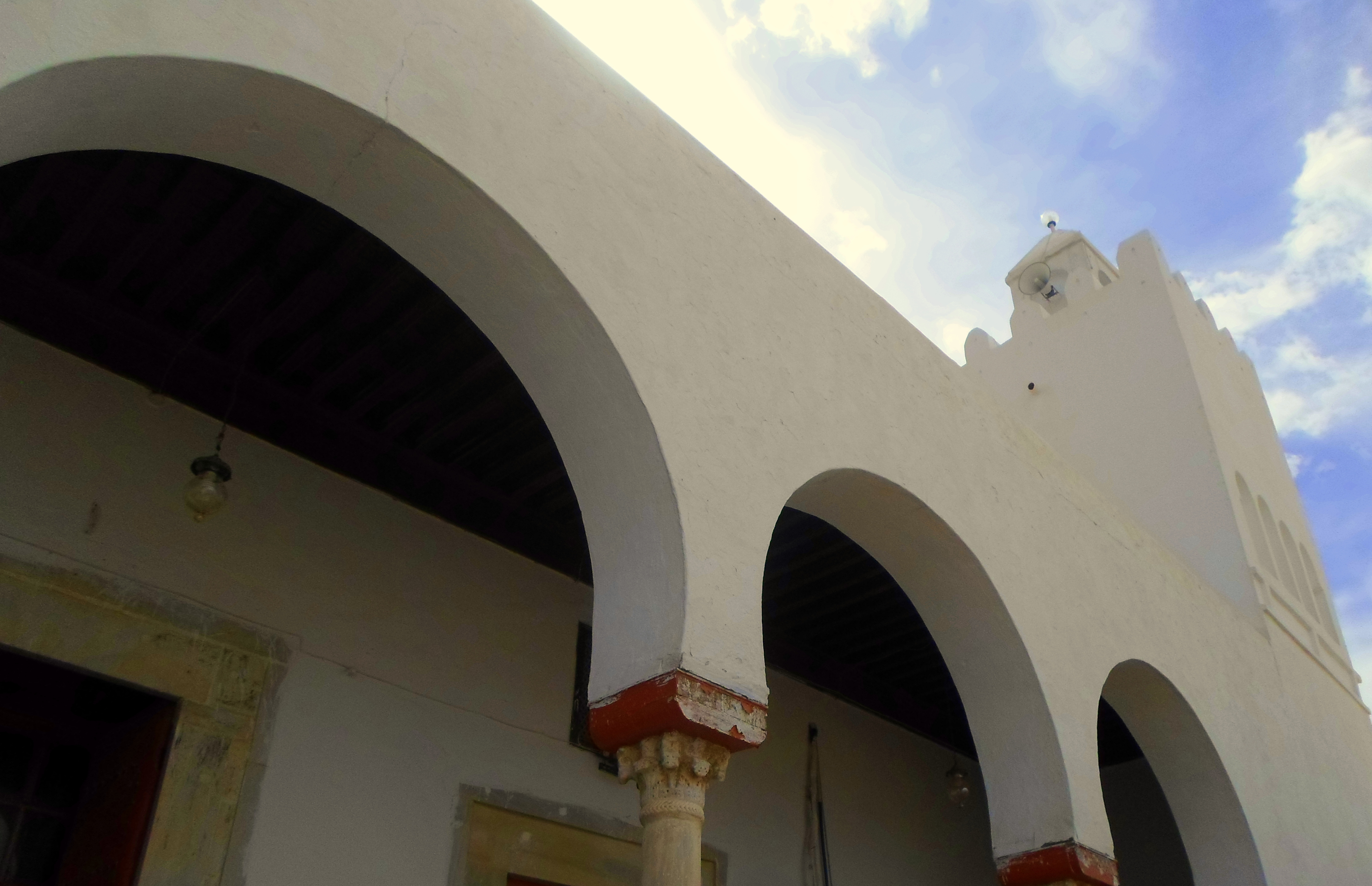
Arches and minaret.

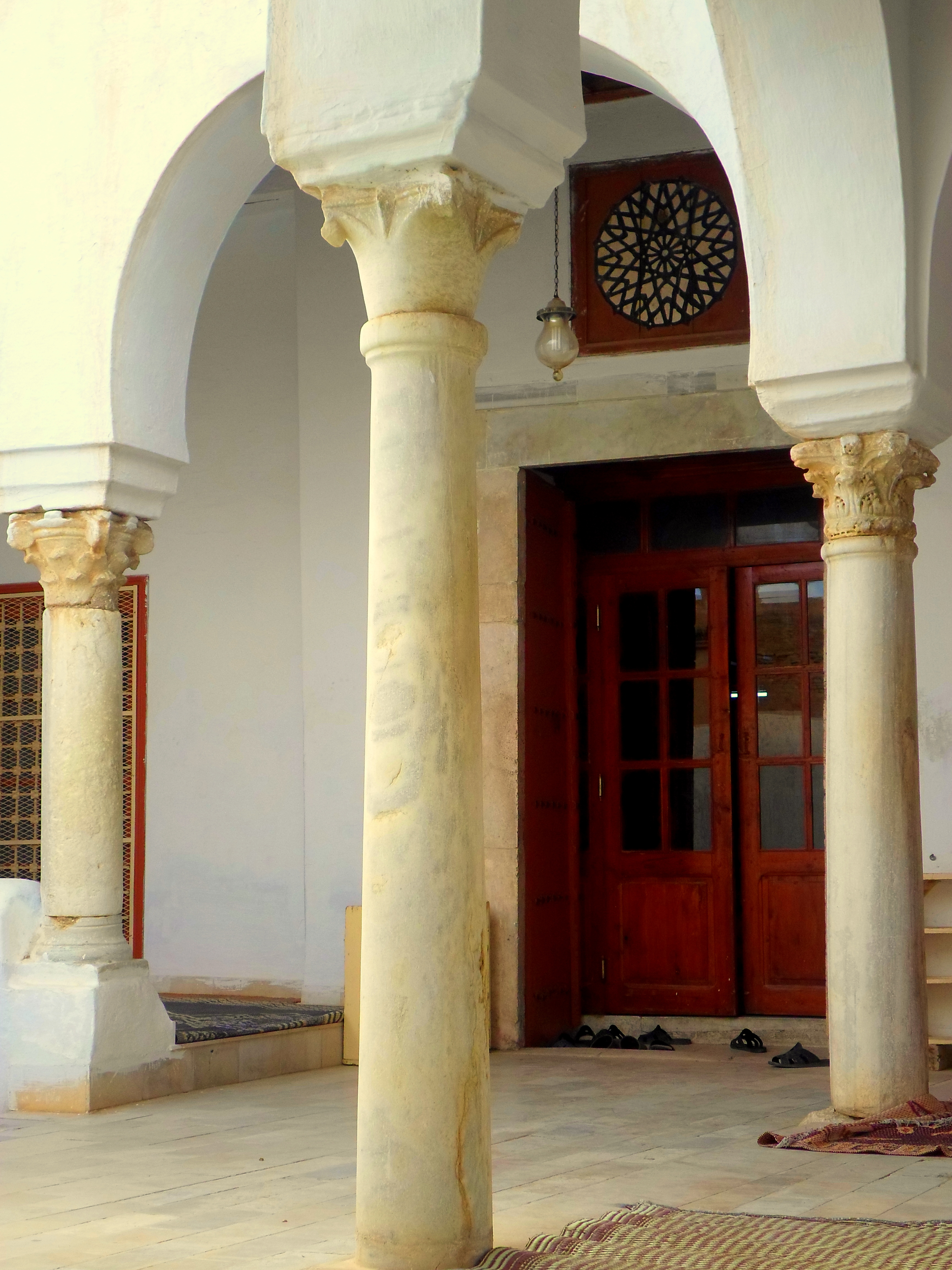
View of some columns.

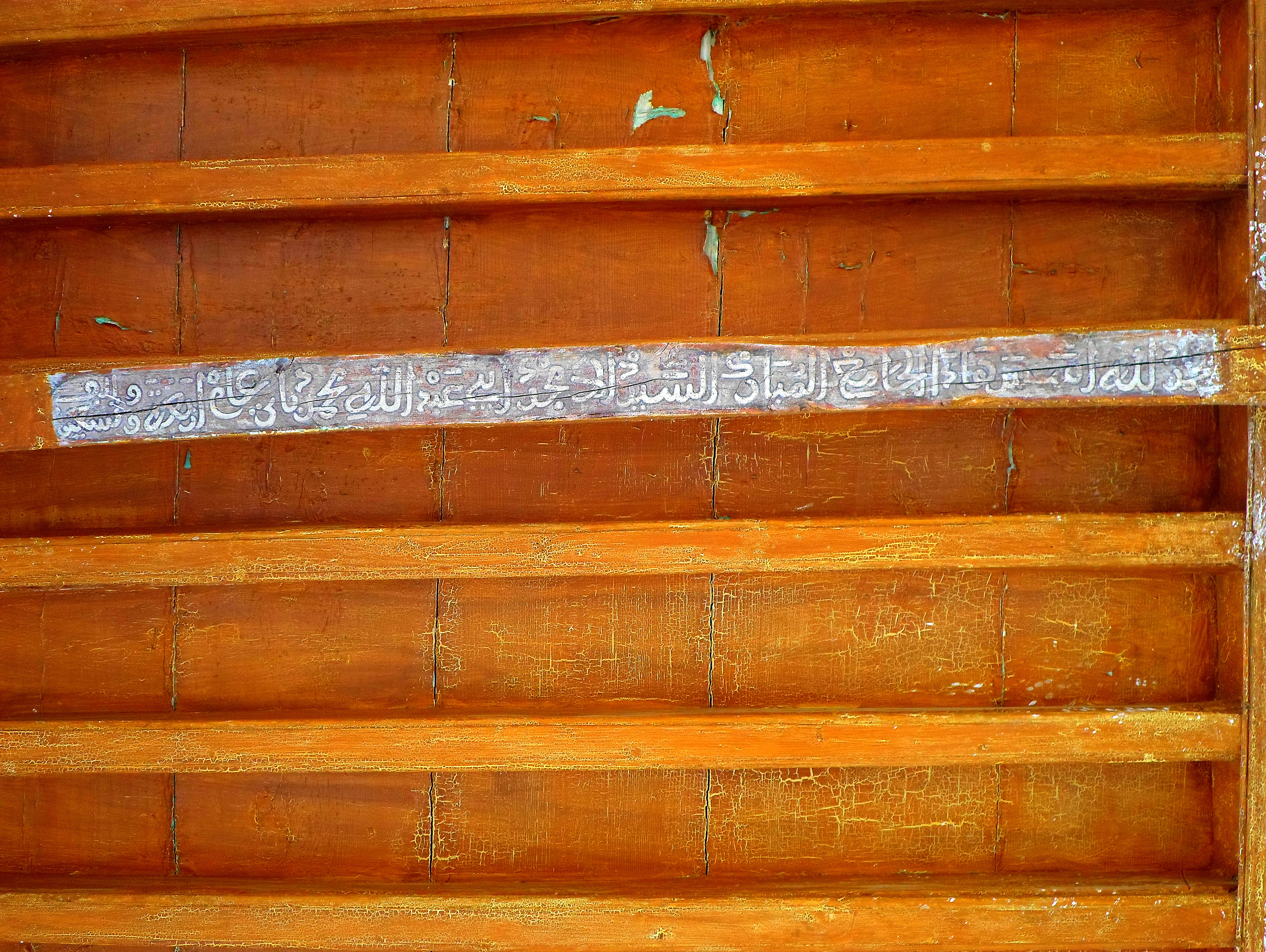
Wooden beam ceiling with an inscription indicating the date of its construction.

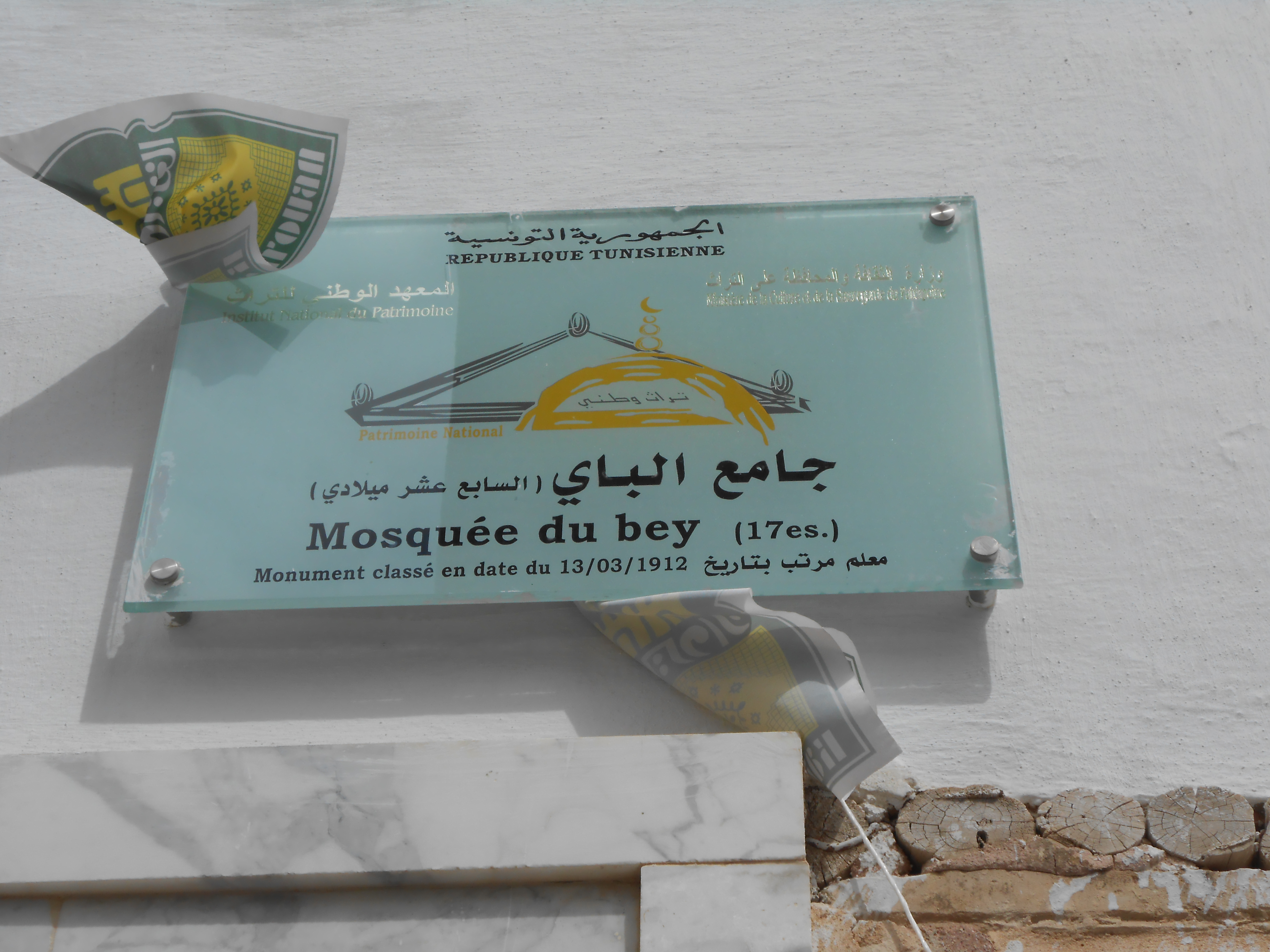
Plaque of the monument.
