= List of mosques in Tunis =

During the 7th century the region of Tunisia was conquered by Arab troops led by the Ghassanid general Hassan ibn al-Nu'man. The city had the natural advantage of coastal access, via the Mediterranean, to the major ports of southern Europe. Early on, Tunis played a military role — the Arabs recognized the strategic importance of its proximity to the Strait of Sicily. From the earliest years of the 8th century, Tunis was the administrative center of this area: it became the Arabs' naval base in the western Mediterranean, and took on considerable military importance, and with a strategic location, the city grew, and with it grew the mosques for the Muslims to pray in.

== Abbasids ==
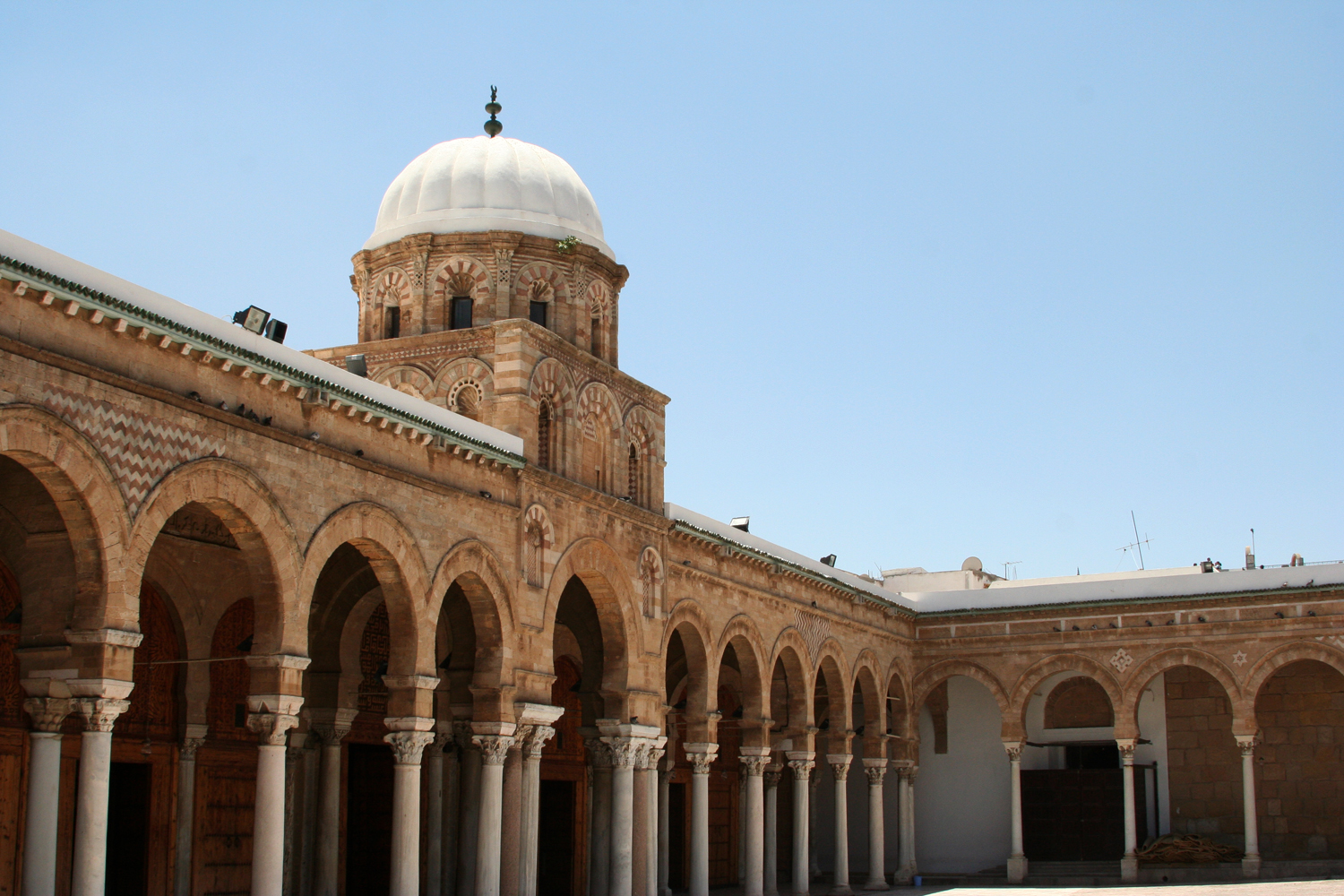
Mosque of Al-Zaytuna, in Tunis

- Al-Zaytuna Mosque

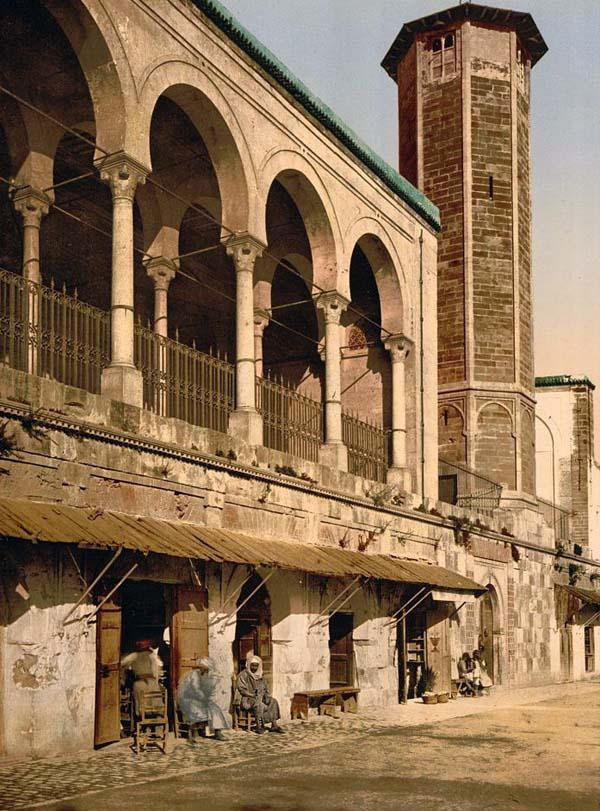
The Halfaouine Mosque, 1899

== Khurasanid dynasty ==
- Ksar Mosque

== Hafsids ==
- Kasbah Mosque
- Al Haliq Mosque
- Al Haoua Mosque
- Bab Bhar Mosque
- Tabbanine Mosque

== Ottomans ==
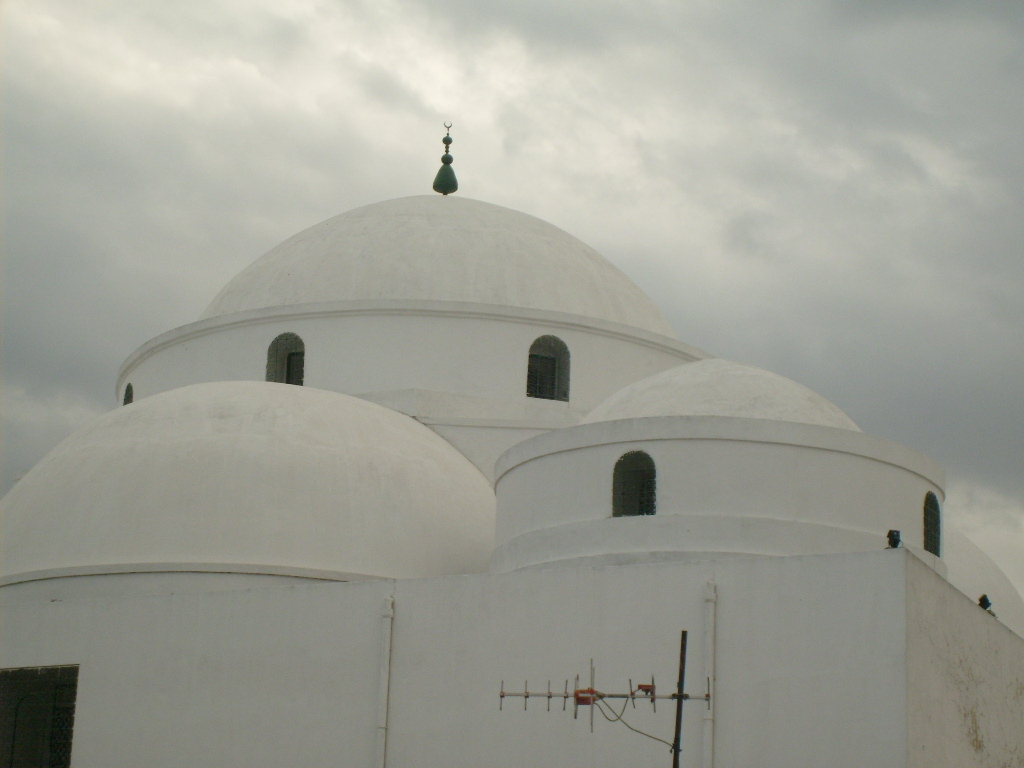
Mosque of Sidi Mahrez

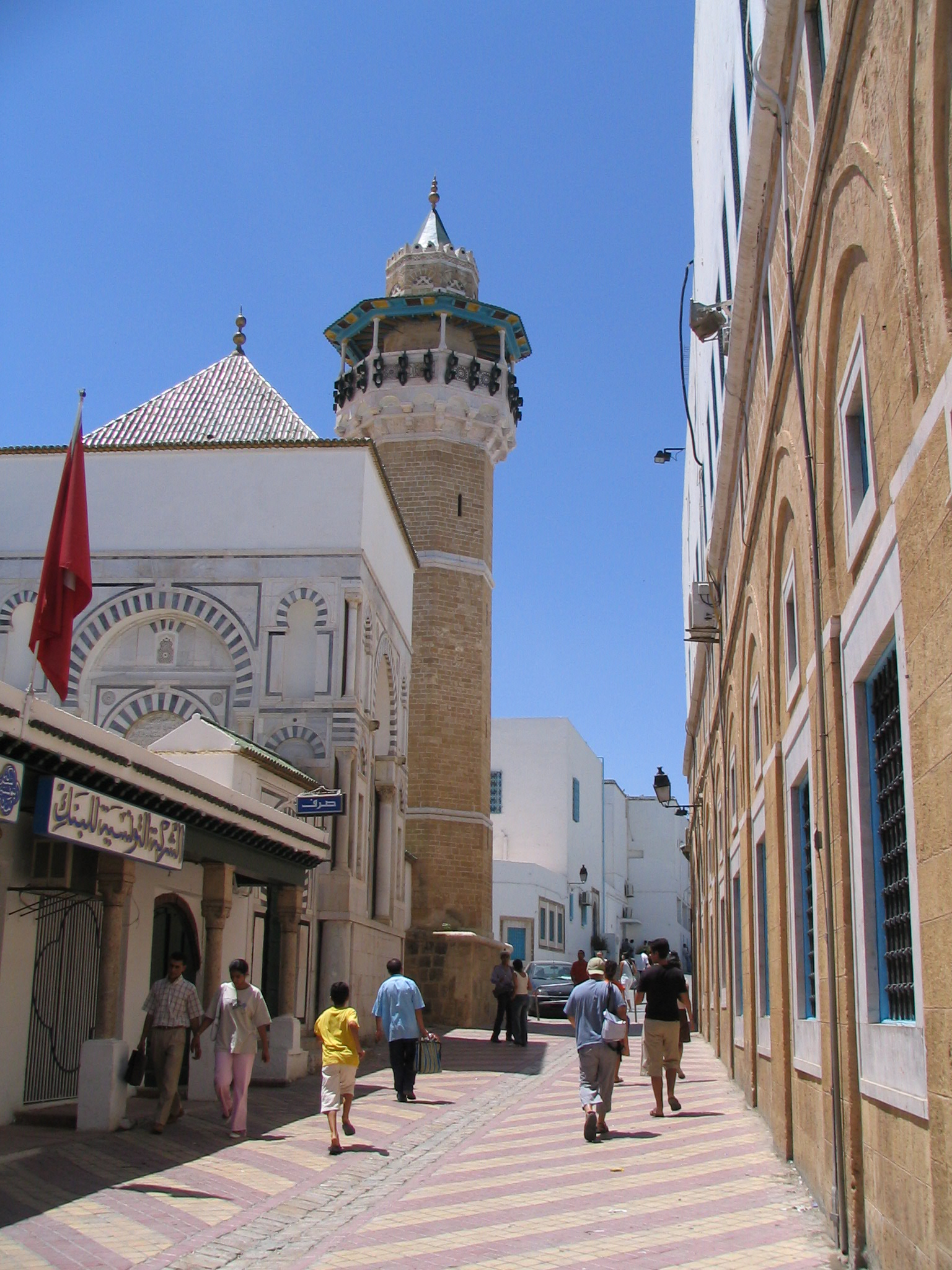
Youssef Dey Mosque

- Bab Jazira Mosque
- Hammouda Pacha Mosque
- Sabkha Mosque
- Sidi Belhassen El Halfaoui Mosque
- Sidi Mahrez Mosque
- Soubhan Allah Mosque
- Youssef Dey Mosque

== Hussainid ==
- El Jedid Mosque
- Saheb Ettabaâ Mosque

== Modern ==
- El Omrane Mosque
- Hajjamine Mosque

== See also ==
- List of mosques in Tunisia
