= Timeline of Tunis =

The following is a timeline of the history of the city of Tunis, Tunisia.

== Prior to 13th century ==
- 814 BCE - Founding of the Carthaginian Empire
- 146 BCE – Romans sack Carthage.
- 737 CE – Ez-Zitouna madrassa founded.
- 800-909 – Tunis was one of the residences of the Aghlabids dynasty.
- 863 – Al-Zaytuna Mosque built.
- 902 – City becomes capital of Ifriqiya.
- 945 – Kharijite insurgents occupy city.
- 1159 – Almohads in power; Tunis becomes capital city.

== 13th–18th centuries ==
- 1227 – Abul Hasan ash-Shadhili founds his first zawiya in Tunis.
- 1229 – Hafsids in power.
- 1230 – Kasbah Mosque built.
- 1252 – Al Haoua Mosque built.
- 1270 – Louis IX of France takes power.
- 1320 – Bab el Khadra built.
- 1350 – Bab Saadoun built (approximate date).
- 1534 – Conquest of Tunis by Hayreddin Barbarossa; Ottomans in power.
- 1535
  - Conquest of Tunis by Spanish Empire.
  - Fortress built at La Goulette.
- 1574 – Conquest of Tunis by Ottomans.
- 1609 – 80,000 Moriscos arrive in Tunis after expulsion from Spain, the highest number since 1492.
- 1624 – Soubhan Allah Mosque built (approximate date).
- 1631 – Youssef Dey Mosque established.
- 1648 – Ksar Mosque renovated.
- 1655 – Hammouda Pacha Mosque built.
- 1685 – Arrival of the first community of Livorno Jews (known as 'Granas') in Tunis
- 1692 – Sidi Mahrez Mosque built.
- 1710 – Bab Jazira Mosque built.
- 1726 – El Jedid Mosque built.
- 1741 – Ali II ibn Hussein grants a charter to the Livorno Jews (Granas) in Tunis.
- 1756 – An Algerian army captures Tunis, deposing Abu l-Hasan Ali I and installing Muhammad I ar-Rashid

== 19th century ==
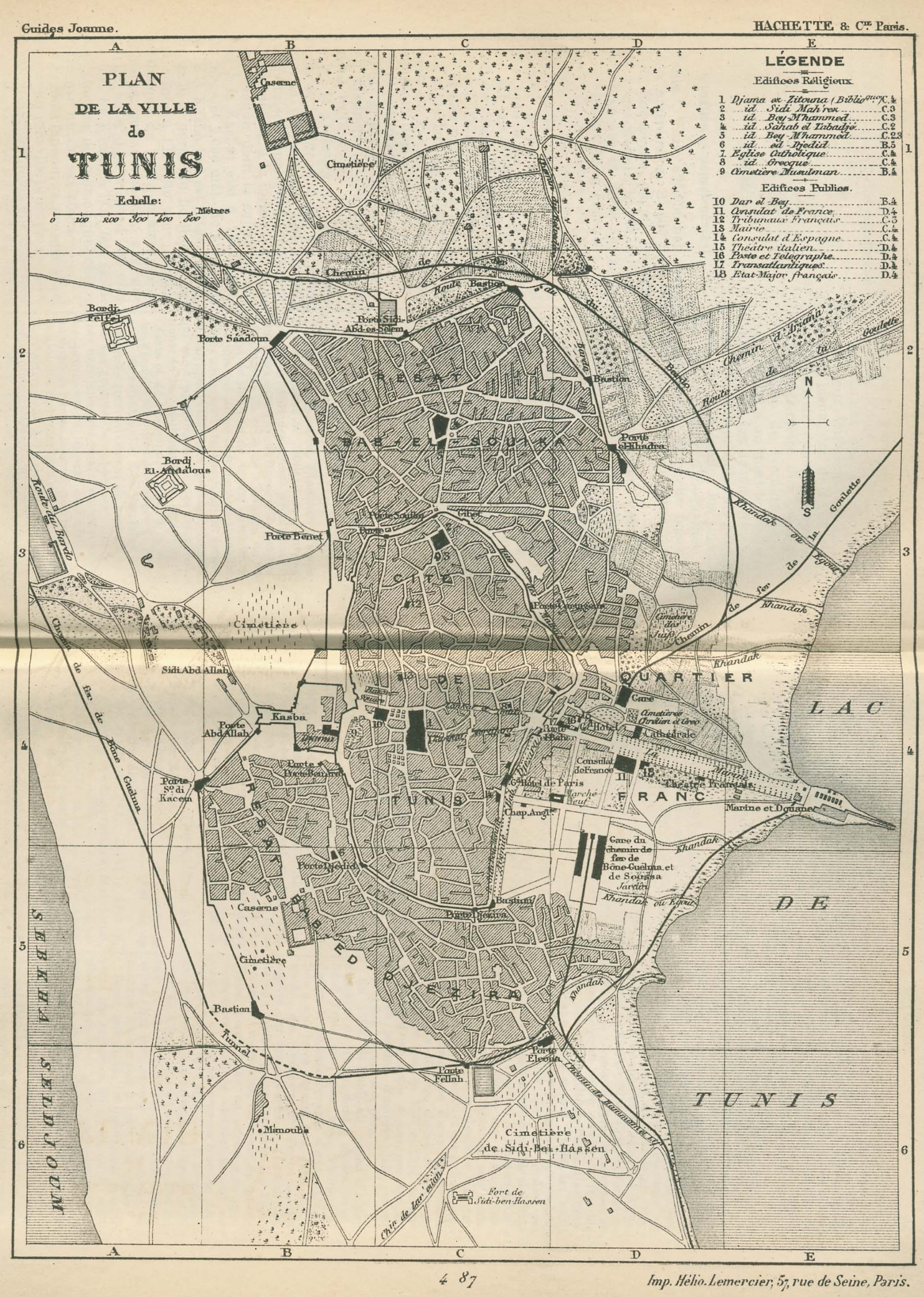
Map of Tunis, 1888

- 1811 – Rebellion.
- 1813 – Sabkha Mosque restored.
- 1814 – Saheb Ettabaâ Mosque built.
- 1818 – Plague strikes Tunis killing up to 50,000 and depopulating the city as people flee.
- 1819 – Dar Lasram built.
- 1840 – Military academy founded at Bardo by Ahmed Bey
- 1857 – Batto Sfez Affair.
- 1860 –
  - Old city walls demolished.
  - Tunisia's first official printing press established in Tunis. First edition of the Official Gazette of the Republic of Tunisia published.
- 1872 – Tunis-Goulette-Marsa railway begins operating.
- 1875 – Sadiki College founded.
- 1881 – City occupied by French.
- 1882 – Alaoui Museum dedicated.
- 1885 – Bibliothèque Francaise established.
- 1892 – Consulate of France building constructed.
- 1893 – Canal opens.
- 1897 – Cathedral of St. Vincent de Paul opens.
- 1900 – Lycée de la Rue du Pacha founded.

== 20th century ==
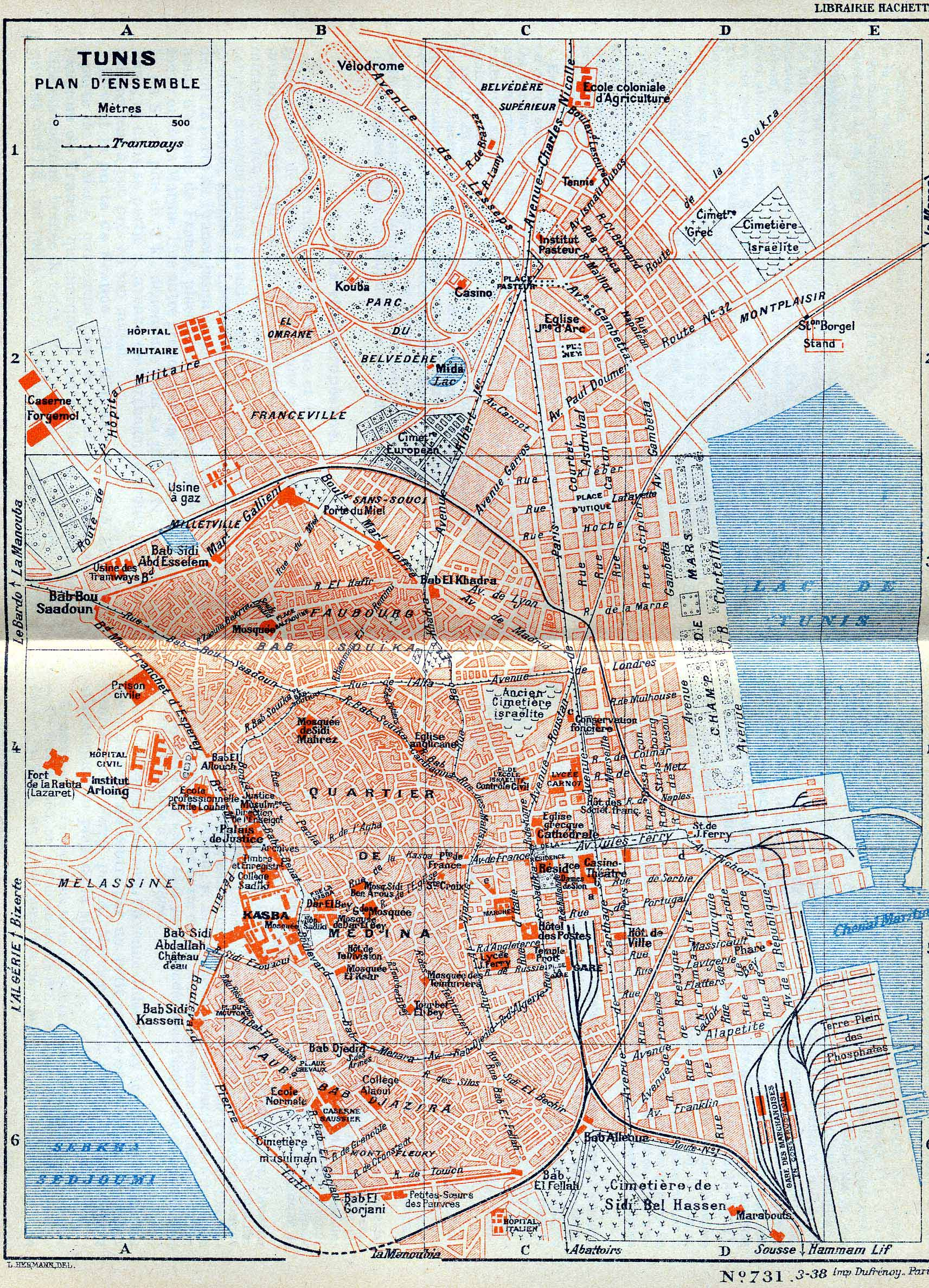
Map of Tunis, 1937

- 1901 – Palais de Justice built.
- 1903 – Compagnie des tramways de Tunis founded
- 1906 – Population: 227,519.
- 1906 – Thala-Kasserine Disturbances
- 1907 – Young Tunisians founded
- 1908 – Omnia Pathé opens.
- 1910 – Belvedère Park opens.
- 1911 – Jellaz Affair
- 1912 – Tunis Tram Boycott
- 1914 – Hotel Majestic built.
- 1919 – Espérance Sportive de Tunis founded.
- 1920
  - Club Africain sport club founded.
  - Municipal Theatre built.
- 1923 – Tunis Institute of Fine Arts founded.
- 1924 – National Library opens.
- 1931
  - Coliseum built.
  - Hajjamine Mosque restored.
- 1932 – Hotel Claridge built.
- 1934 – The Rachidia Institute founded to preserve traditional Tunisian music.
- 1935 – El Omrane Mosque built.
- 1936 – Population: 219,578.
- 1937 – Grand synagogue opens.
- 1942 – November – Occupation of city by Axis powers begins.
- 1943 – May – Allies oust Axis forces.
- 1944 – Tunis–Carthage International Airport developed.
- 1946 – Population: 364,593.
- 1948 – Stade Tunisien football club founded.
- 1953 – Election boycott.
- 1956
  - Independence from France
  - Zitouna University formed.
  - Lycée Francais de Mutuelleville and National Library of Tunisia established.
- 1957 – Monarchy abolished
- 1958 – Central Bank of Tunisia headquartered in Tunis.
- 1959 – City designated capital of Tunisian Republic.
- 1963 – Parc Zoologique de la Ville de Tunis set up.
- 1964 – Carthage International Festival begins.
- 1966
  - First Carthage Film Festival
  - Population: 468,997 city; 647,640 urban agglomeration.
- 1967 – Stade El Menzah built.
- 1969
  - Bourse de Tunis founded.
  - Tunisian Symphony Orchestra established.
- 1973 – Tunisia Private University founded.
- 1976 – Puppet theatre established.
- 1978 – Museum of Popular Arts and Tradition inaugurated.
- 1979 –
  - Arab League headquartered in Tunis.
  - UNESCO designates the Medina of Tunis as a World Heritage Site.
- 1982 – Palestine Lberation Organisation (PLO) moves from Beirut to Tunis
- 1983 –
  - National Theatre of Tunisia established.
  - First Carthage Theatre Festival held.
- 1984 – Population: 596,654 city; 1,394,749 urban agglomeration.
- 1985 – Métro léger de Tunis begins operating.
- 1988
  - Israeli attack on PLO headquarters
  - University of Carthage founded.
- 1990 – Meeting of the Association Internationale des Maires Francophones held in city.
- 1992 – Maison des arts "Dar el founoun" in operation.
- 1993 – Palace Theatre opens.
- 1996 – Theâtre de l'Étoile du Nord established.
- 1998
  - National School of Circus Arts established.
  - Population: 702,330.
- 2000 – Tunis El Manar University founded.

== 21st century ==
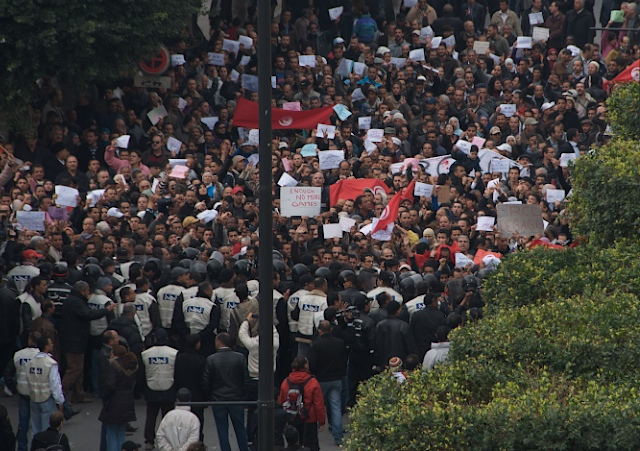
Protesters and police on Avenue Bourguiba, Tunis, January 2011

- 2003 – Société des transports de Tunis formed.
- 2004
  - Population: 728,453.
  - City hosts African Judo Championships.
- 2007
  - Islamist militants clash with security forces.
  - Grand Prix de la ville de Tunis begins.
- 2008 – Tunis Sports City construction begins.
- 2009 – Stade Chedli Zouiten renovated.
- 2010
  - December – Protests.
  - Air pollution in Tunis reaches annual mean of 38 PM2.5 and 90 PM10, more than recommended.
- 2011
  - Protests.
  - Population: 790,000.
- 2012
  - June – Salafists riot against art exhibit.
  - August – Protests against reduction of women's rights.
- 2014 – Population: 1,056,247 (urban agglomeration).
- 2015
  - 18 March – The Bardo National Museum attack kills 21, mostly tourists.
  - 25 March – 2015 Tunis barracks shooting.
  - 24 November – The 2015 Tunis bombing.
- 2016
  - City hosts African Judo Championships.
- 2018
  - City hosts African Judo Championships.

== See also ==
- Tunis history
- History of Tunis
- List of Beys of Tunis
- List of heritage sites in the Tunis Governorate
- Urbanization in Tunisia
- History of Tunisia
- Timeline of Tunisia

== Bibliography ==
=== in English ===
Published in 19th century

- M.M. Noah (1819), "(Tunis)", Travels in England, France, Spain, and the Barbary States, New-York: Kirk and Mercein, hdl:2027/nyp.33433081557641, OCLC 1338665
- Josiah Conder (1830), "Tunis", The Modern Traveller, London: J.Duncan
- Ernest von Hesse-Wartegg (1882), Tunis: the Land and the People, New York: Dodd, Mead, and Company, OL 24641383M
- R. Lambert Playfair (1895), "City of Tunis", Handbook for Travellers in Algeria and Tunis (5th ed.), London: J. Murray, OCLC 4443952

Published in 20th century

- Frances E. Nesbitt (1906), "Tunis", Algeria and Tunis, London: A. and C. Black
- "Tunis", Jewish Encyclopedia, vol. 12, New York, 1907
- "Tunis", Southern Italy and Sicily (15th ed.), Leipzig: Karl Baedeker, 1908, OCLC 1648449
- Graham Petrie (1908), Tunis, Kairouan & Carthage, London: W. Heinemann, OL 23351574M
- "Tunis" . Encyclopædia Britannica. Vol. 27 (11th ed.). 1910. pp. 392–393.
- "Tunis". Encyclopaedia of Islam. E.J. Brill. 1936. p. 837+. via Google Books
- Noelle Watson, ed. (1996). "Tunis". International Dictionary of Historic Places: Middle East and Africa. UK: Routledge. pp. 708–710. ISBN 978-1884964039.

Published in 21st century

- Paul Tiyambe Zeleza; Dickson Eyoh, eds. (2003). "Tunis, Tunisia". Encyclopedia of Twentieth-Century African History. Routledge. ISBN 978-0415234795.
- Kevin Shillington, ed. (2005). "Tunis". Encyclopedia of African History. Fitzroy Dearborn. ISBN 978-1-57958-245-6.
- Michael R.T. Dumper; Bruce E. Stanley, eds. (2008), "Tunis", Cities of the Middle East and North Africa, Santa Barbara, US: ABC-CLIO
- Gabor Agoston and Bruce Alan Masters, ed. (2009). "Tunis". Encyclopedia of the Ottoman Empire. Facts on File. p. 573. ISBN 978-1-4381-1025-7.

=== in French ===
- Brossard, Ch., ed. (1906). "Tunisie: Description des villes: Tunis". Colonies françaises. Géographie pittoresque et monumentale de la France (in French). Paris: Flammarion. hdl:2027/mdp.39015005579753. (+ table of contents)
- Abdesslem Ben Hamida (2002). "Cosmopolitisme et colonialisme: Le cas de Tunis". Cahiers de l'URMIS (in French). 8 – via Revues.org.
- Pierre-Arnaud Barthel (2003). "Les lacs de Tunis en projets, reflets d'un nouveau gouvernement urbain" [Developing the lakes of Tunis: a new approach in urban governance]. Annales de géographie (in French). 112 (633): 518–536. doi:10.3406/geo.2003.966 – via Persee.fr.
- Moez Bouraoui (2003). "L'agriculture urbaine en Tunisie: espace relictuel ou nouvelle composante territoriale? Le cas du Grand Tunis" [Urban agriculture in Tunisia: residual space or a new territorial component? The case of Greater Tunis]. Revue de géographie alpine (in French). 91 (4): 43–54. doi:10.3406/rga.2003.2261.
- Habib Dlala [in French] (2011). "L'émergence métropolitaine de Tunis dans le tournant de la mondialisation" [Emergence of metropolitan Tunis in the face of globalization]. Méditerranée (in French). 116 (116): 95–103. doi:10.4000/mediterranee.5416 – via Revues.org.
