= Sidi Belhassen El Halfaoui Mosque =

Mosque in Tunis, Tunisia

- جامع سيدي بلحسن الحلفاوي
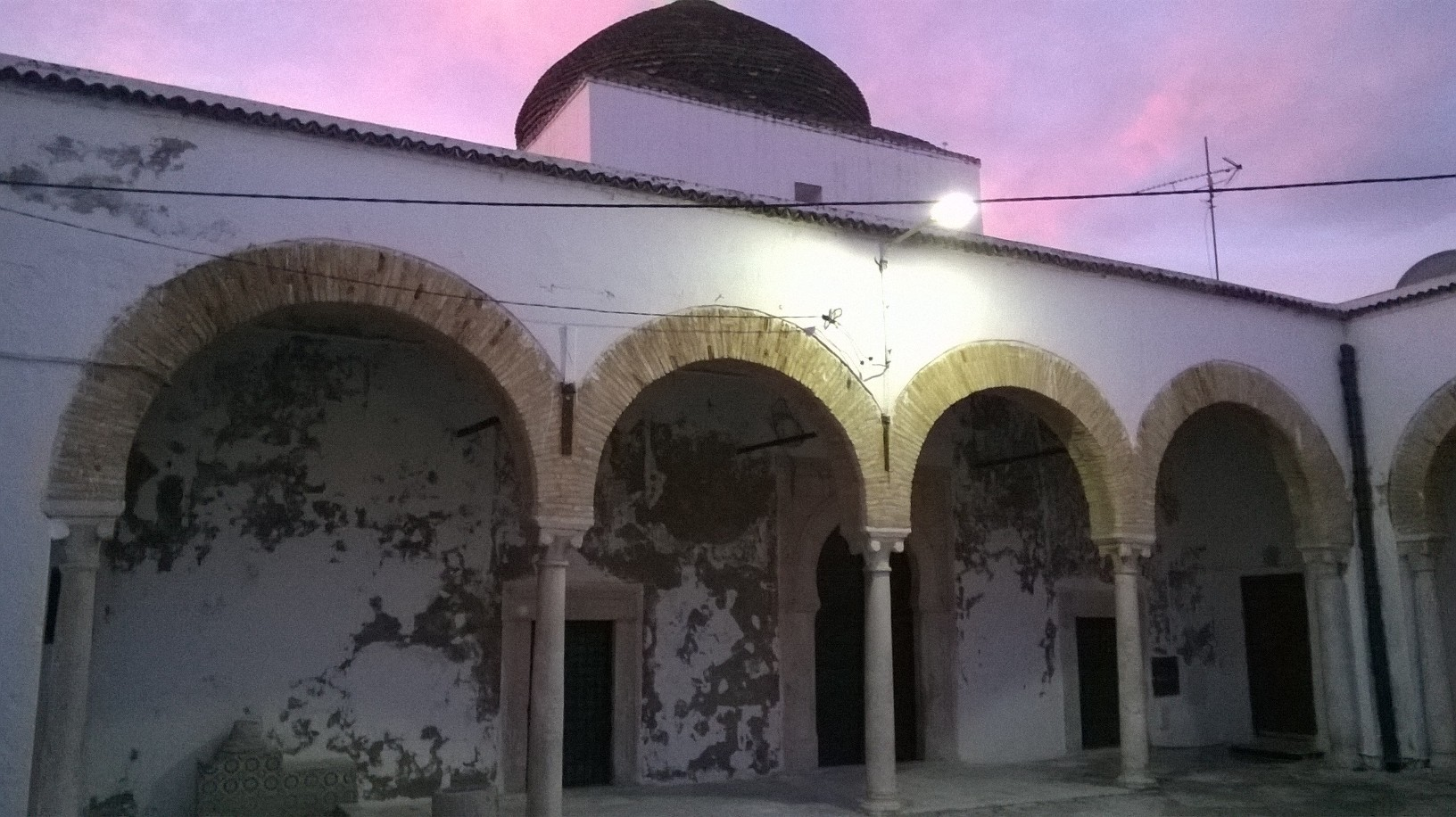

Religion
- Affiliation: Islam
- Branch/tradition: Sunni

Location
- Location: Tunis, Tunisia
- Interactive map of Sidi Belhassen El Halfaoui Mosque

Architecture
- Type: mosque

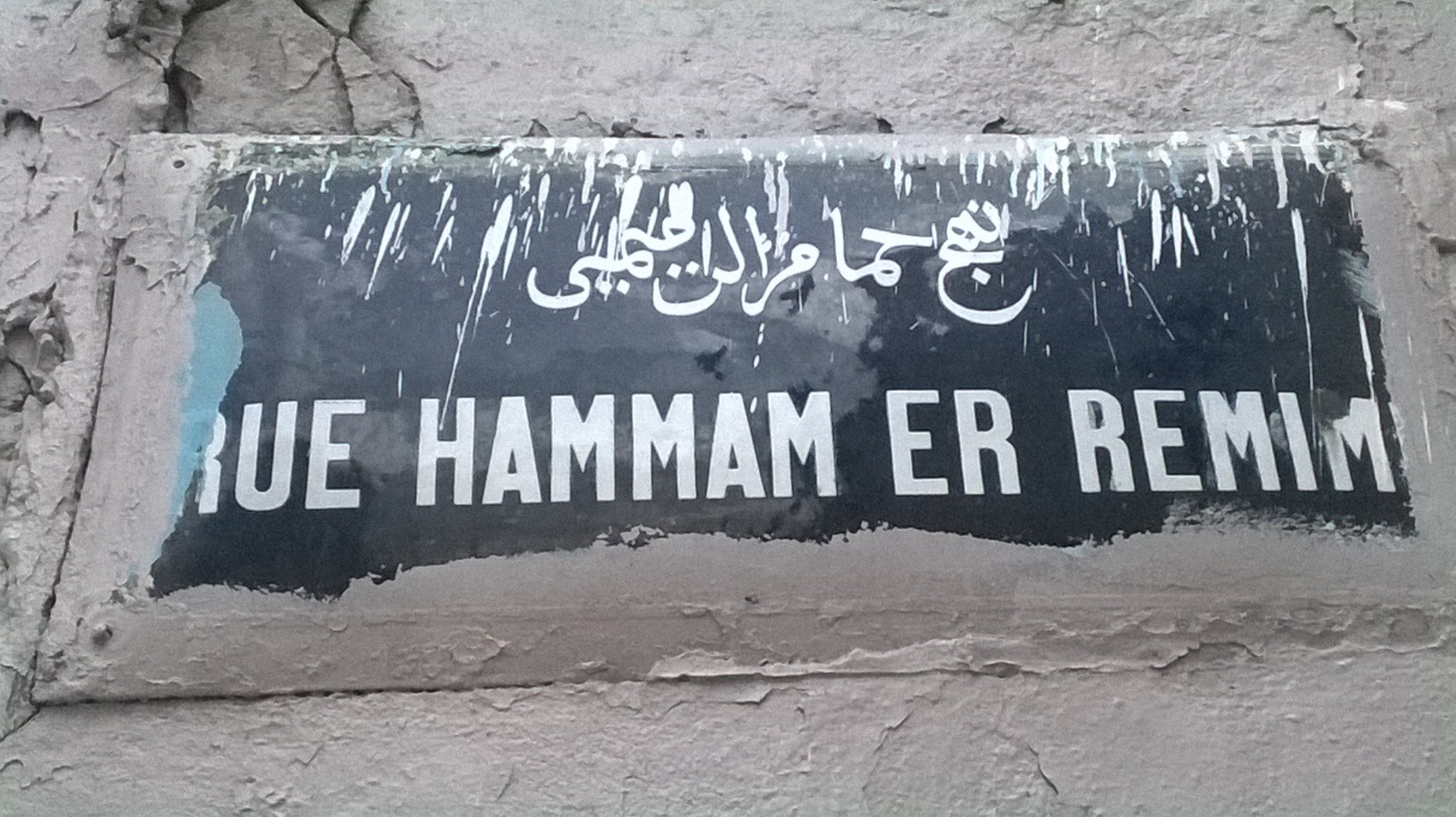
Hammam El Remimi Street

Sidi Bellahssan El Halfaoui Mosque (Arabic: جامع سيدي بلحسن الحلفاوي) is a Tunisian mosque in the Halfaouine neighborhood in the Medina of Tunis in Tunisia.

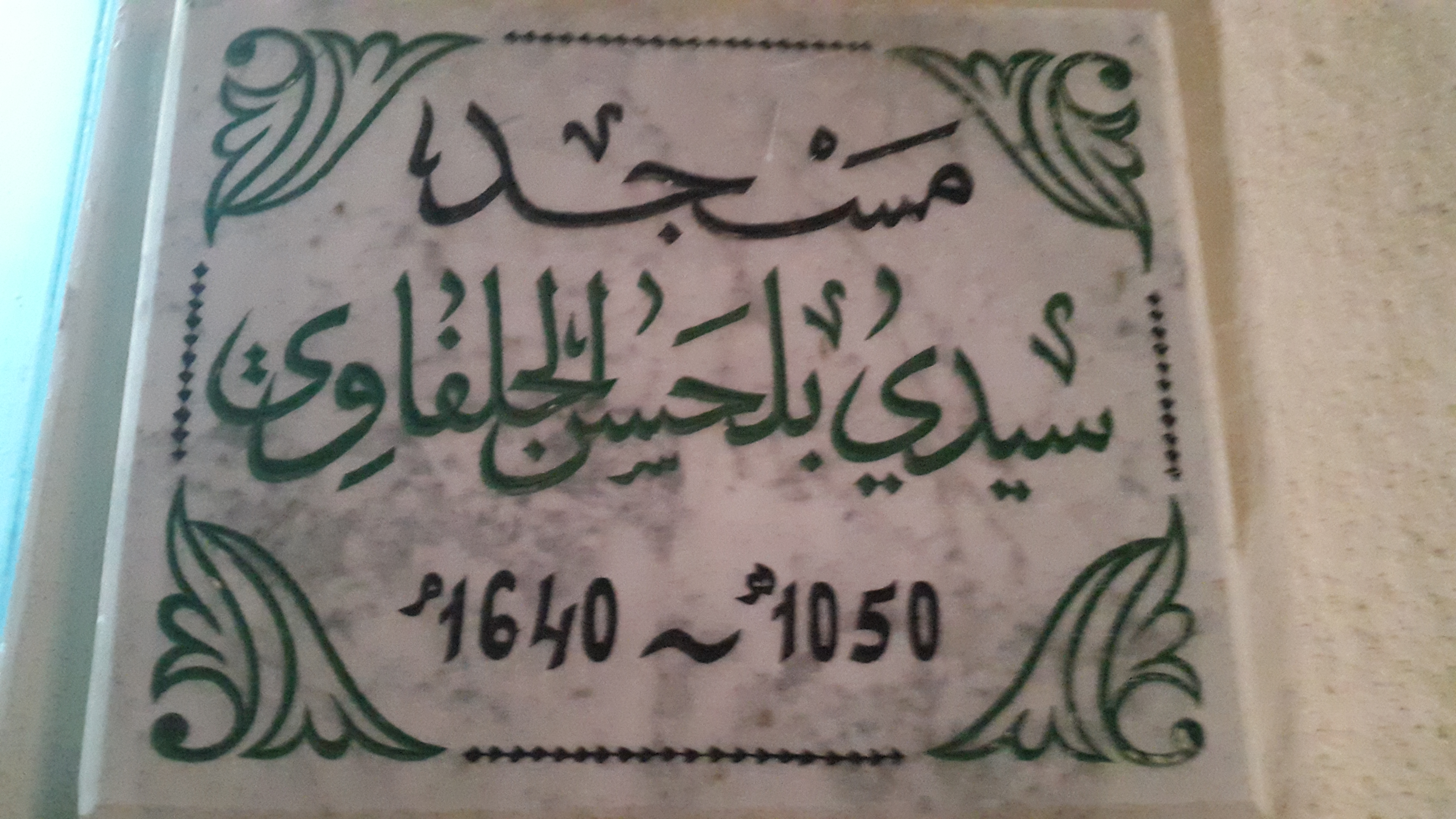
Plate of Sidi El Halfaoui Mosque

It was built in 1640, in the Mouradite era, to commemorate Bellahssan El Halfaoui, one of the Sidi Mohammed El Halfaoui descendants, a practitioner of tariqa and the shadhili. His mausoleum is close to the mosque, on Hammam El Remimi Street.
