= Tabbanine Mosque =

Mosque in Tunis, Tunisia

- جامع التبانين
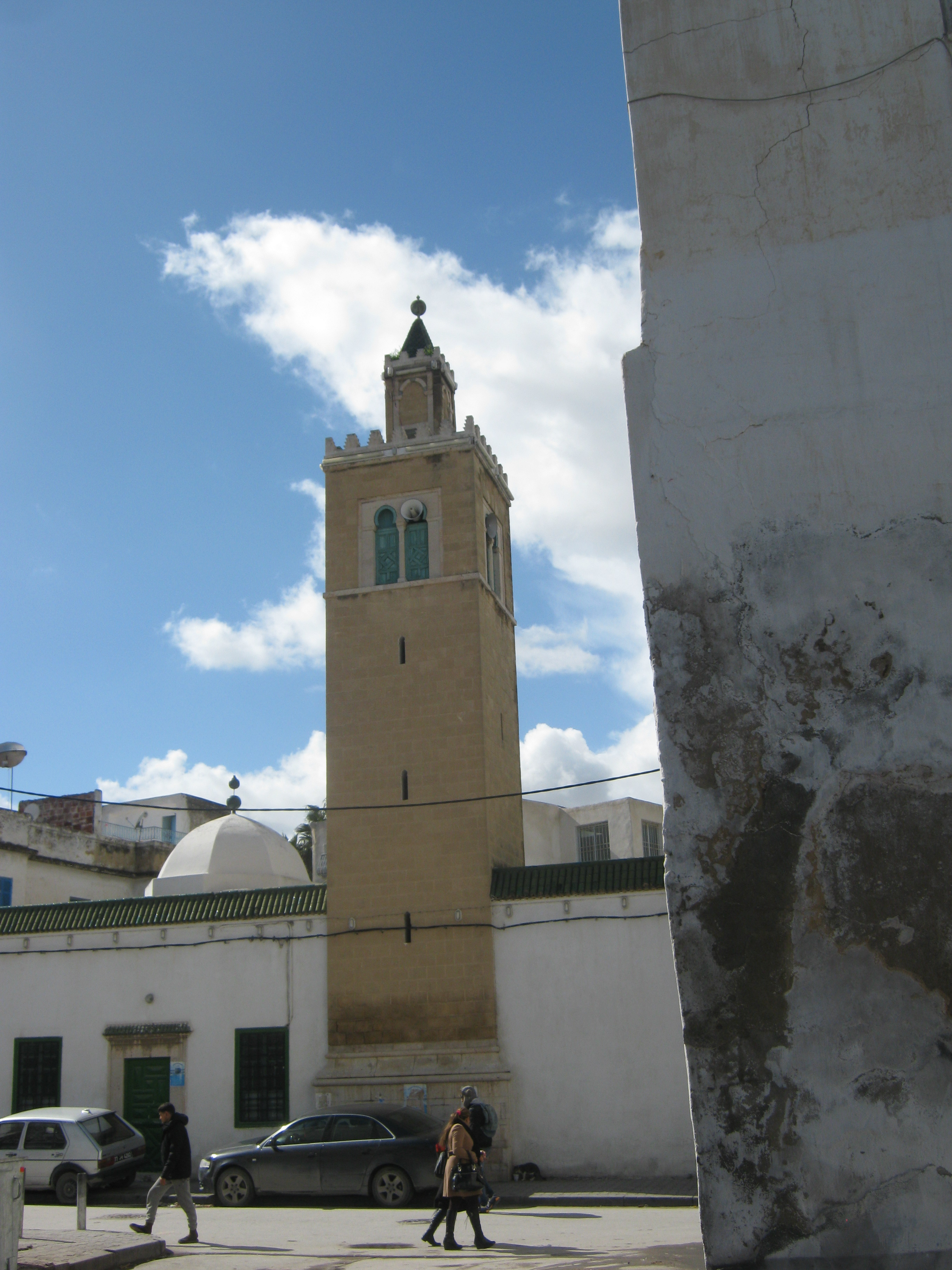

Religion
- Affiliation: Sunni Islam

Location
- Location: Tunis, Tunisia
- Interactive map of Tabbanine Mosque

Architecture
- Type: Mosque

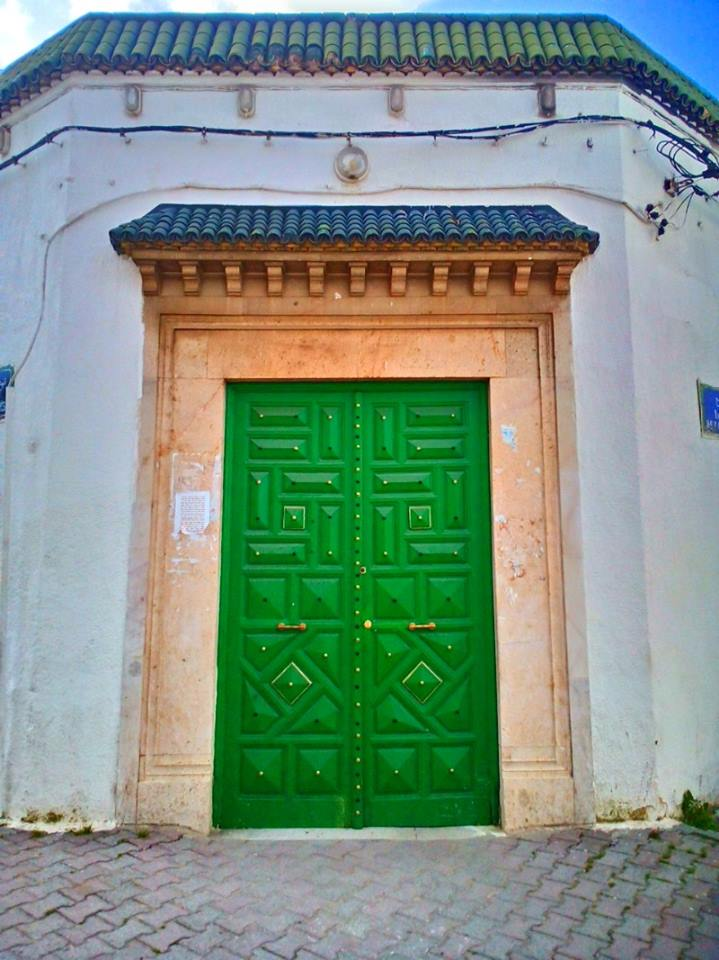
Entrance of Tabbanine Mosque

Tabbanine Mosque also known as Sidi Jaafar Mosque (Arabic: مسجد سيدي جعفر), is an old mosque in the medina of Tunis in Tunisia. It was built by the hafsid Sultan Uthman.

== Etymology ==
It got its name from the hay (Arabic: تبن) sellers who used to settle around it.

== Localization ==
The mosque can be found in 21 Bab Lakouas Street in Bab Souika suburb.

== History ==
It was built during the Hafsid era, following the orders of Sultan Uthman in 1487.
