= Bab Bhar Mosque =

Mosque in Tunis, Tunisia

- جامع باب بحر
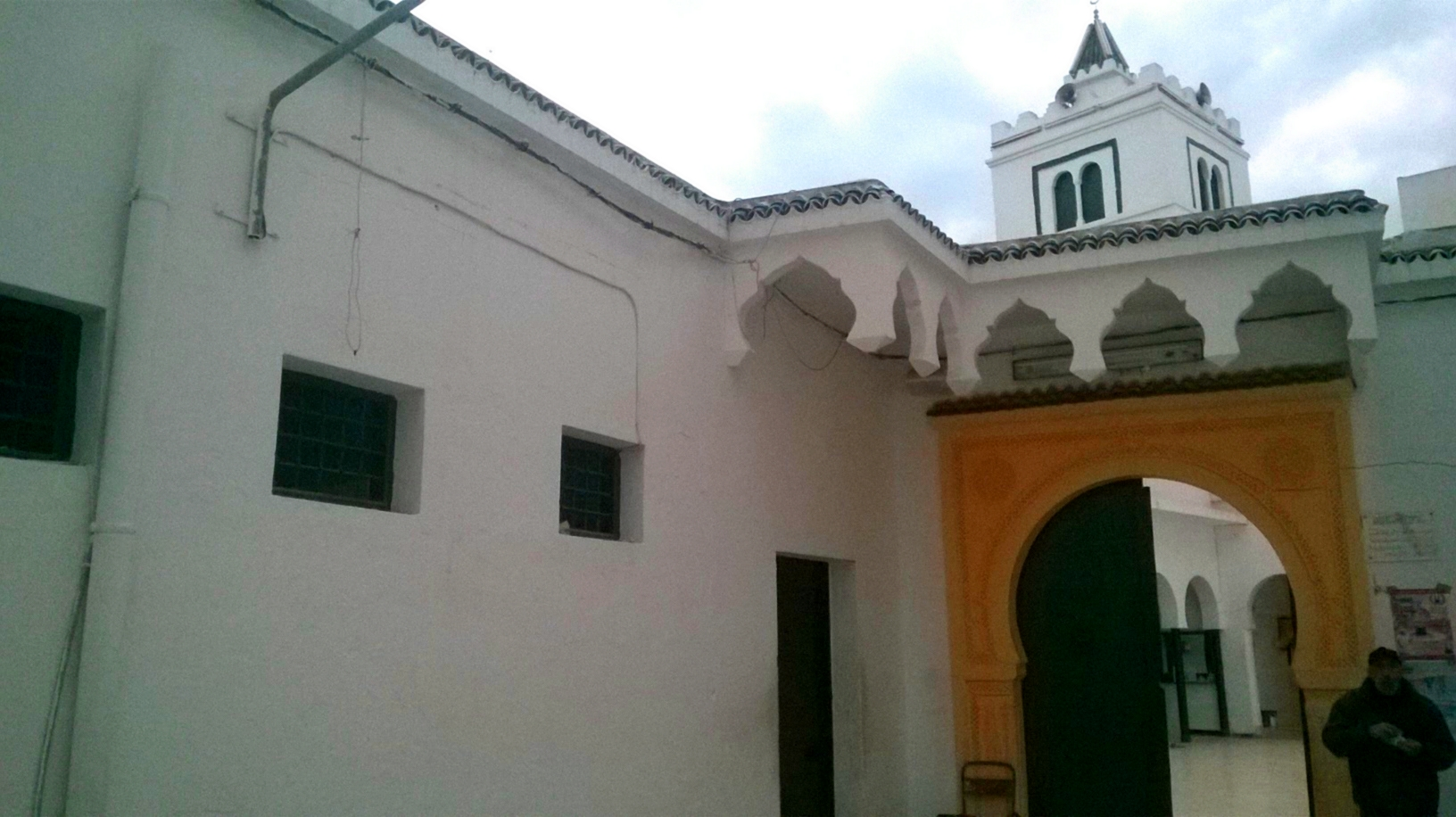

Religion
- Affiliation: Islam
- Branch/tradition: Sunni

Location
- Location: Tunis, Tunisia
- Interactive map of Bab Bhar Mosque
- Coordinates: 36.79998°N 10.17585°E

Architecture
- Type: mosque
- Founder: Ahmed Ibn Marzouk Ibn Abi Omara Mousseilli
- Established: 1282

Bab Bhar Mosque (Arabic: جامع باب بحر), also known as Ez-Zraariâ Mosque, is a mosque in Tunis, Tunisia.

== Localization ==
It is located in the east side of the old town of Tunis, in the Helket Ez-Zitoun impasse, near Bab Bhar.

== History ==
This mosque was built by Ahmed Ibn Marzouk Ibn Abi Omara Mousseilli in 1282.

It has been restored between 1969 and 1973.

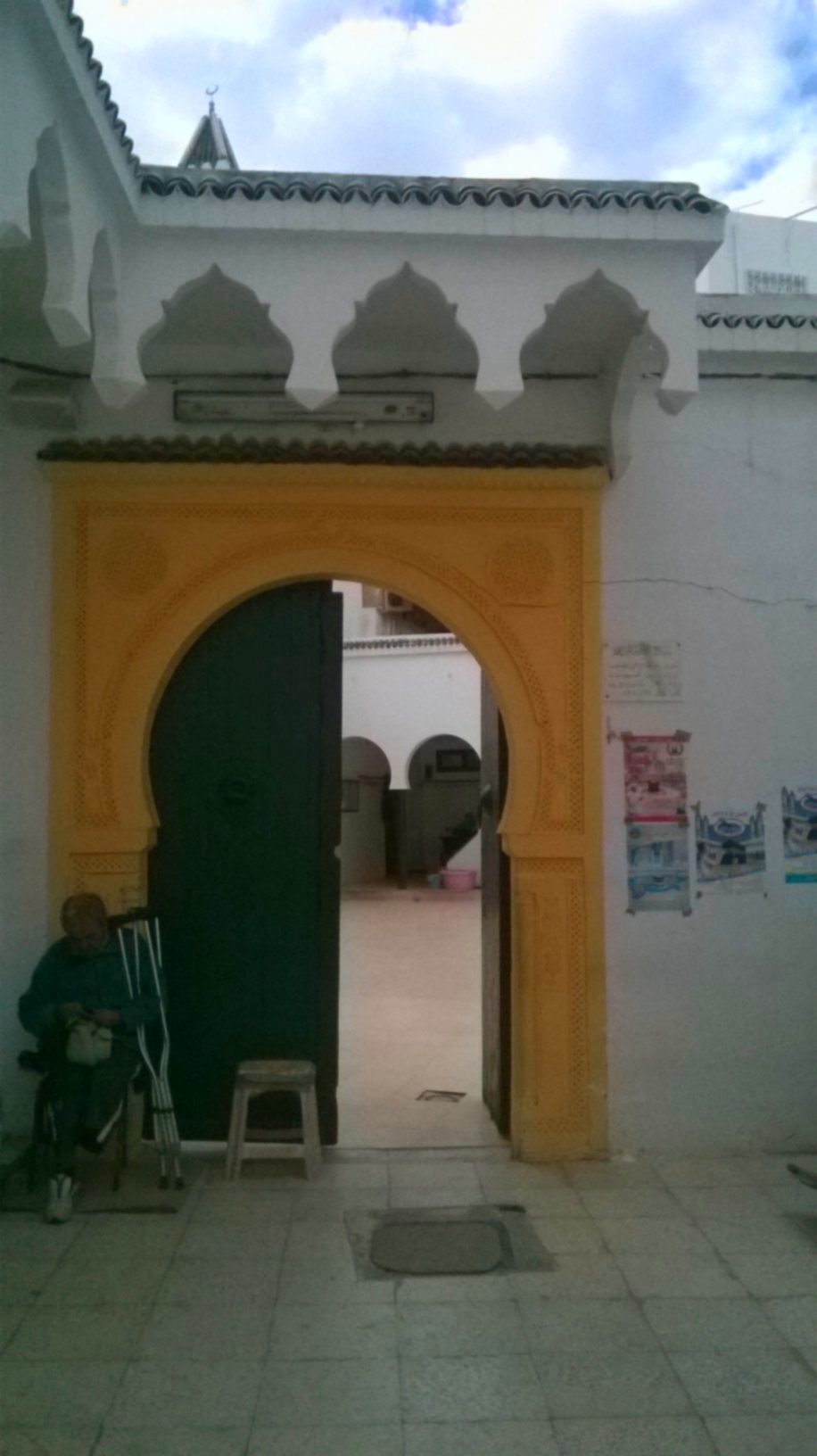
Entrance of the mosque

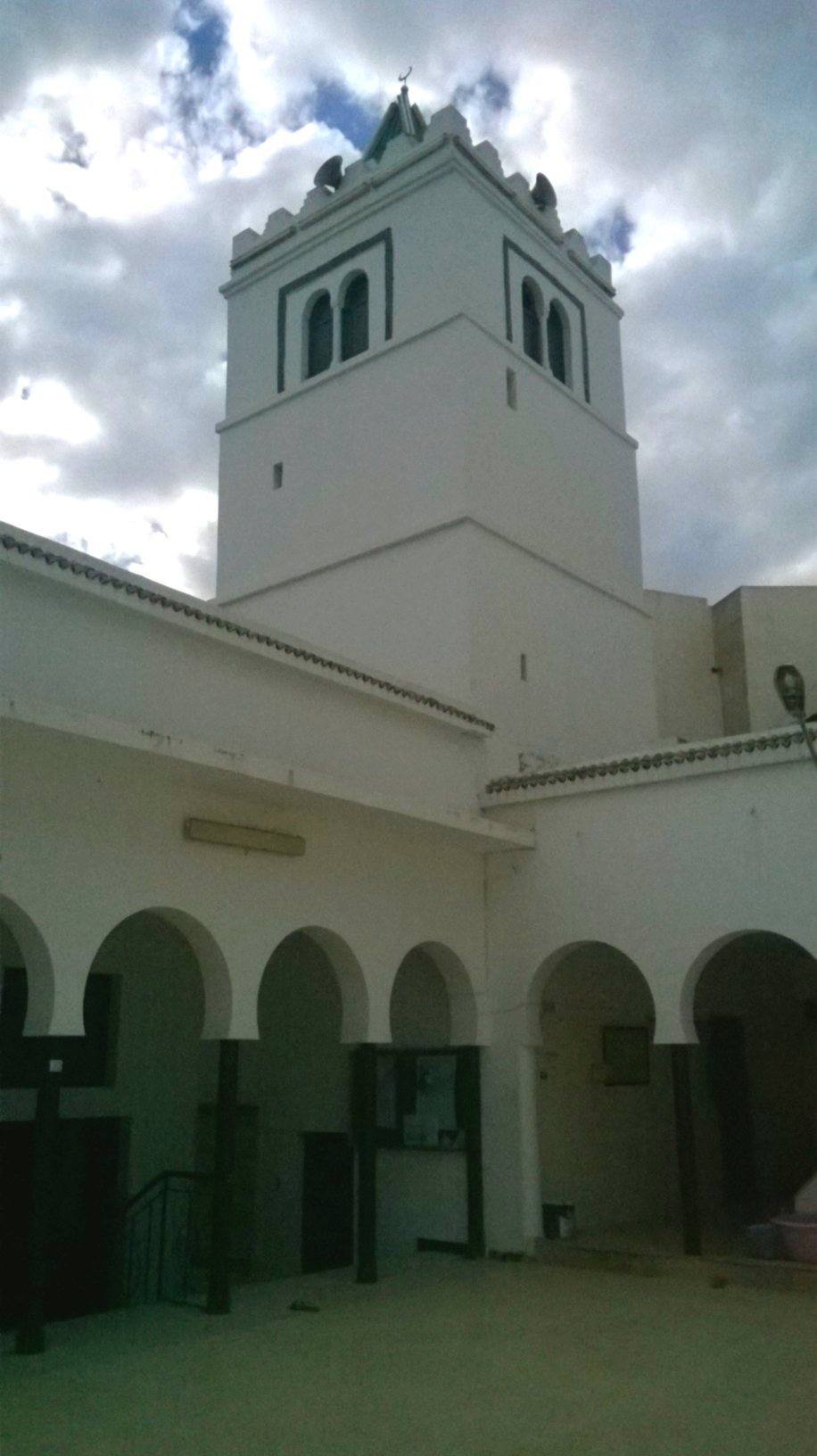
Minaret of the mosque

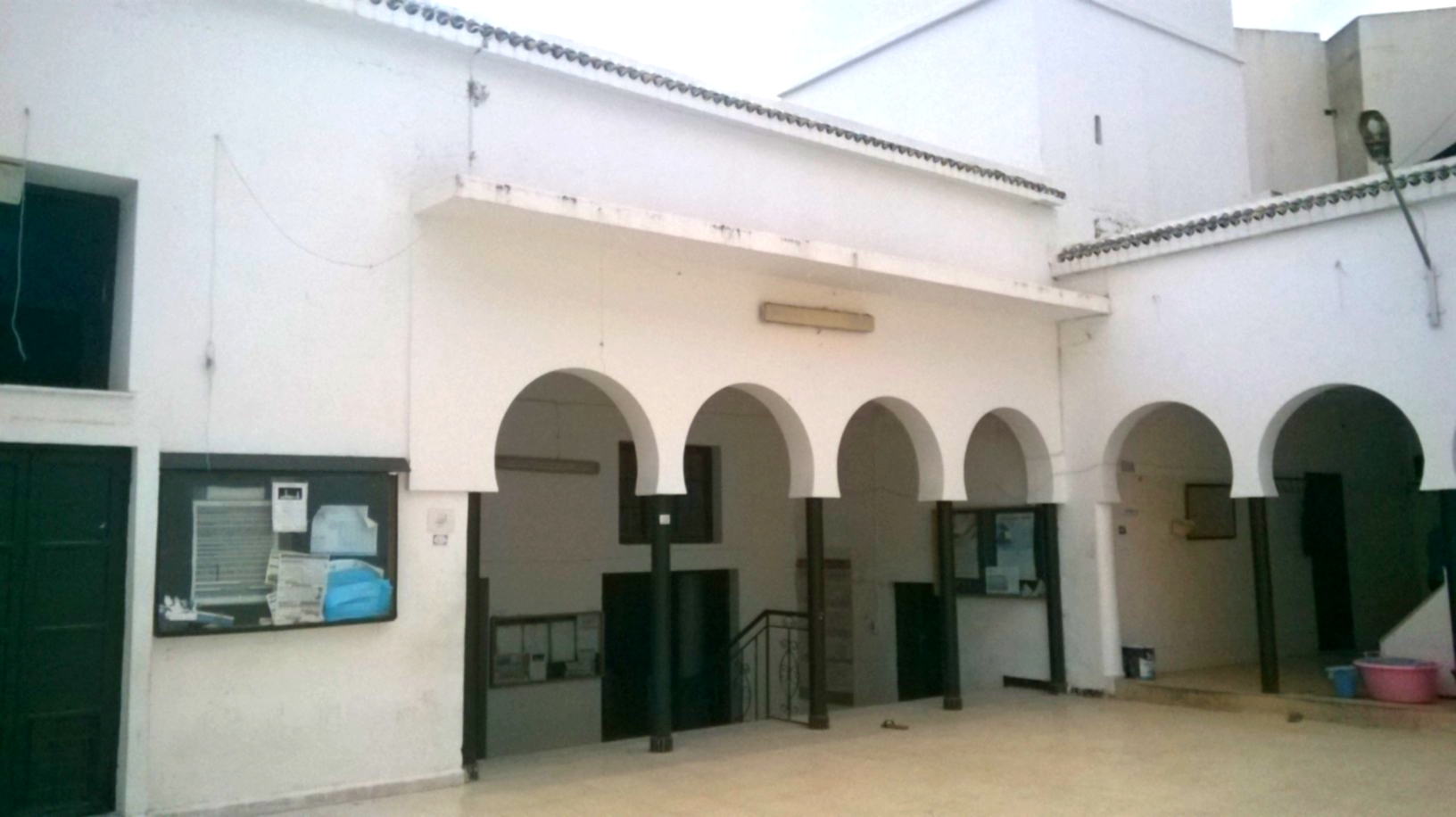
Entrance of the prayer room

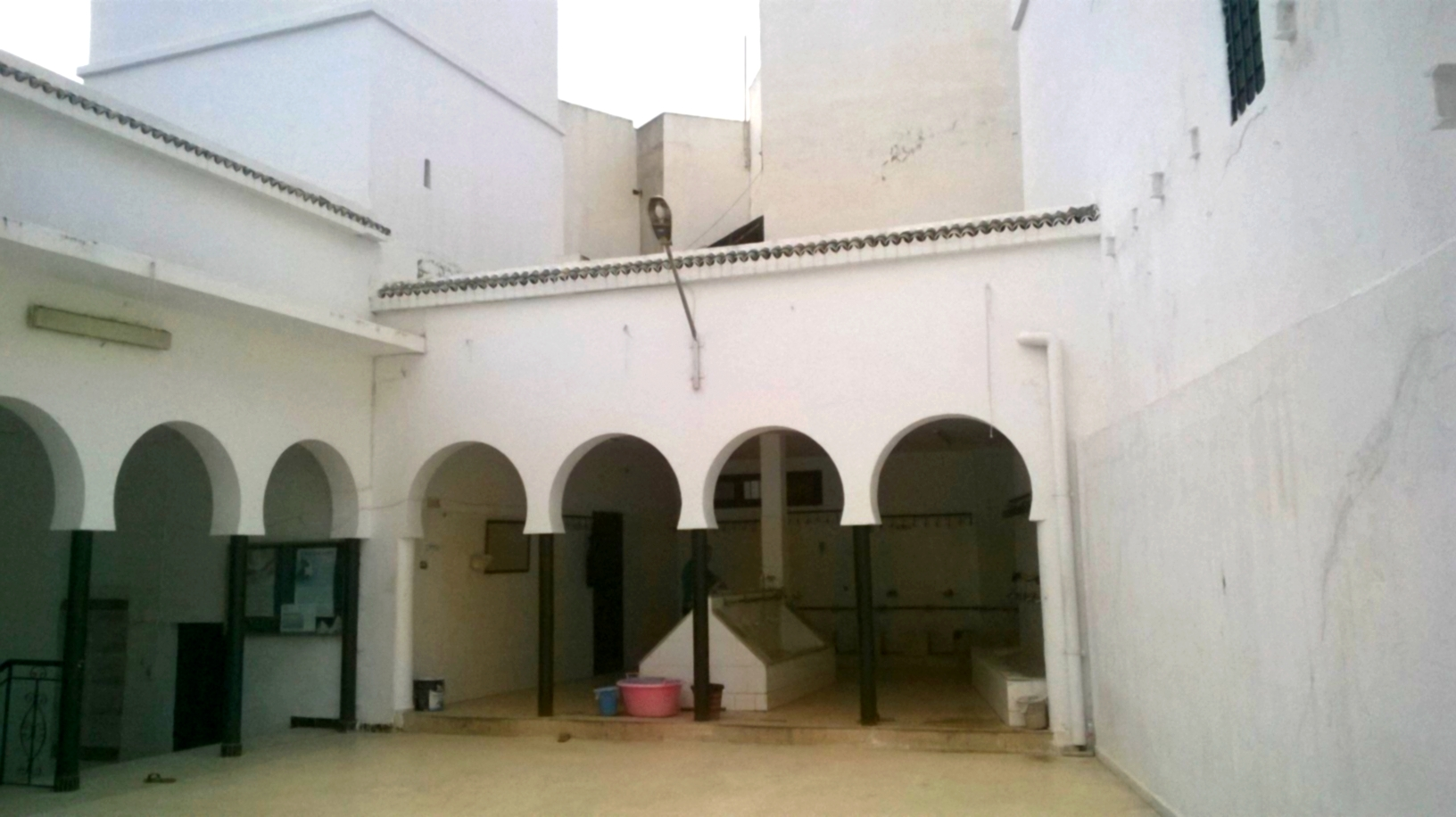
Bassin in the mosque

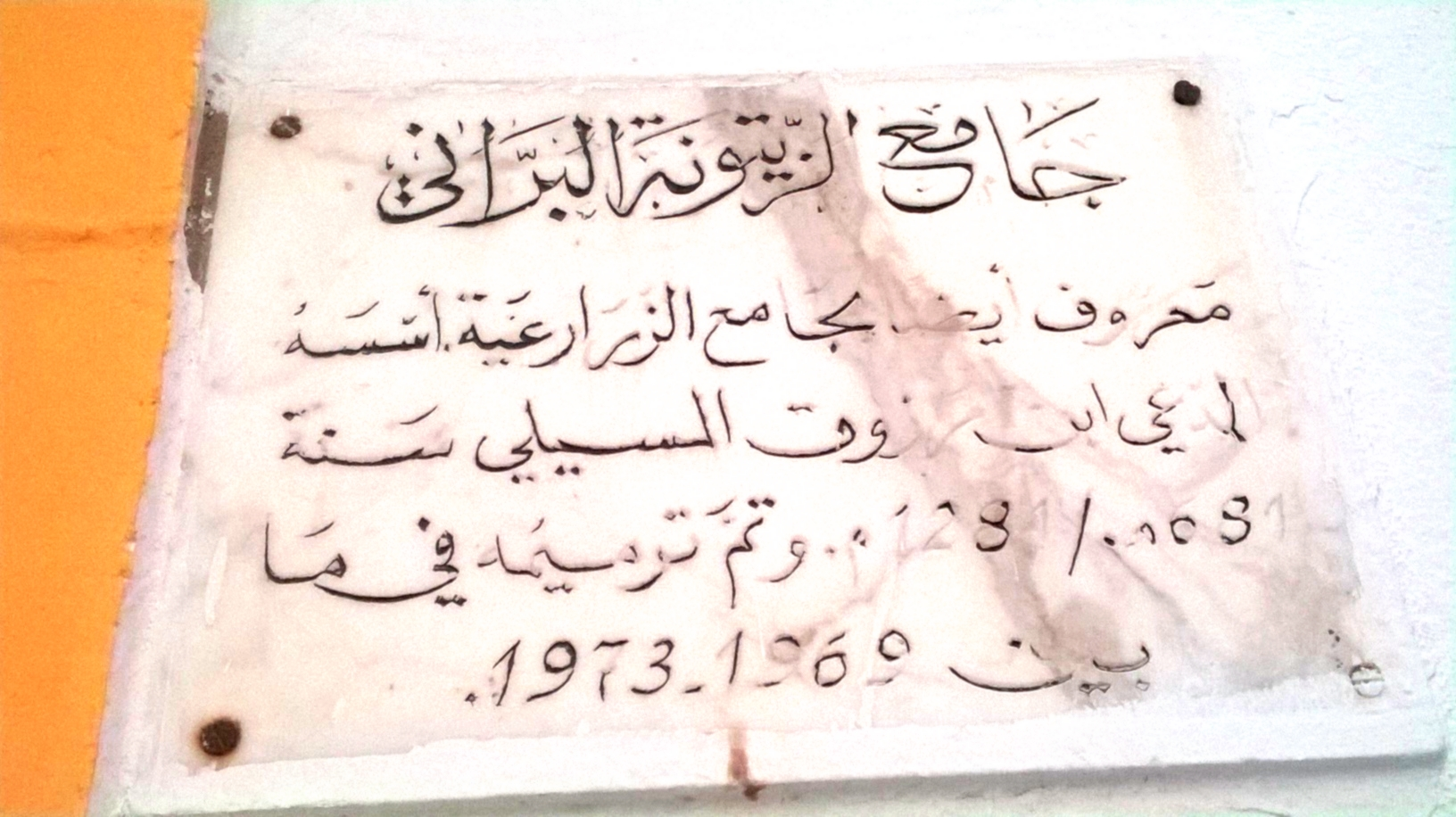
Commemorative plaque of the mosque
