= Sabkha Mosque =

Mosque in Tunis, Tunisia

- جامع السبخة
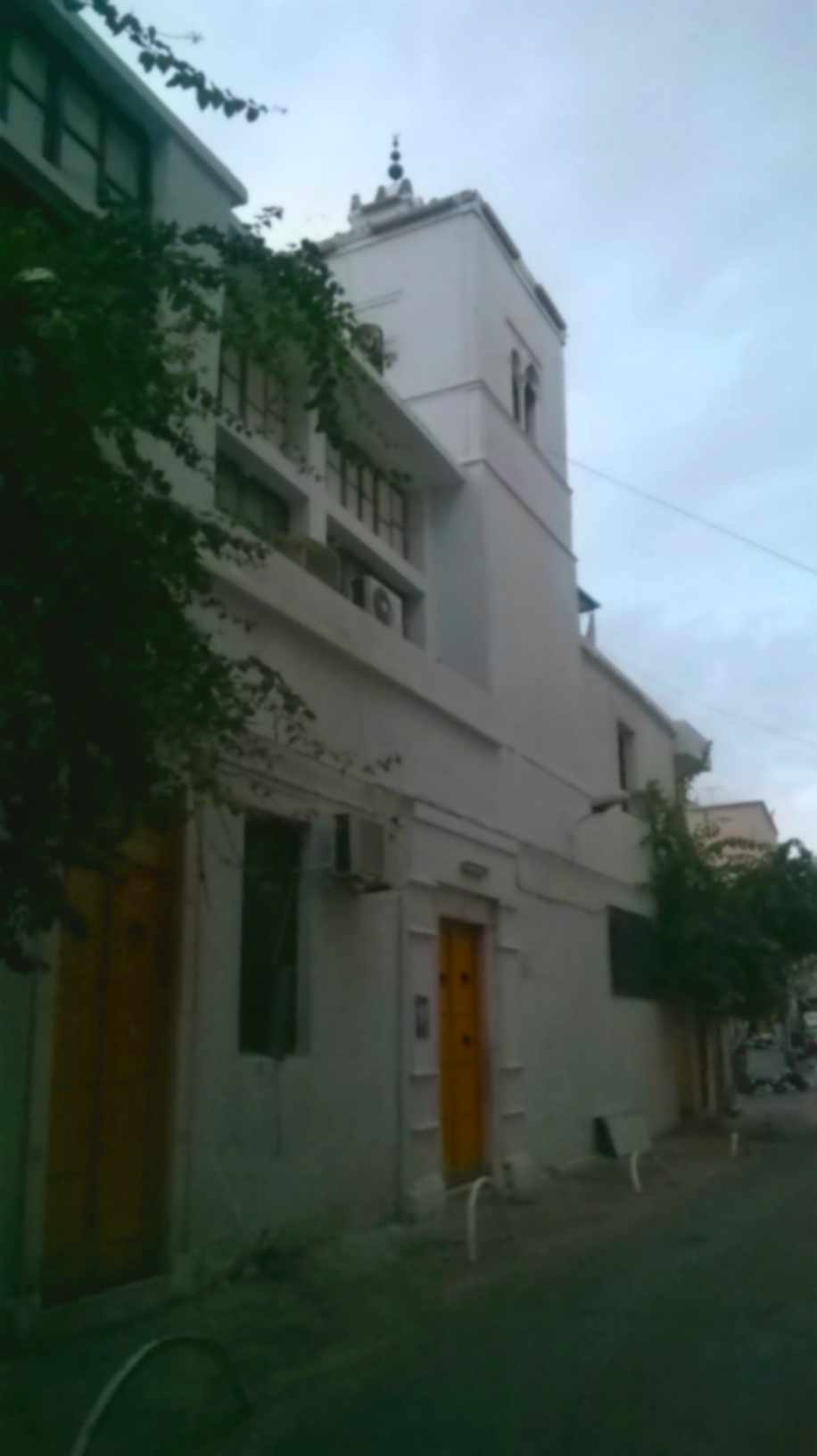

- Location within Tunisia

Religion
- Affiliation: Islam
- Branch/tradition: Sunni

Location
- Location: Tunis, Tunisia
- Coordinates: 36.791057°N 10.179399°E

Architecture
- Type: Mosque

Sabkha Mosque (Arabic: جامع السبخة) is a Tunisian mosque in the south of the medina of Tunis in Bab Jaziza suburb.

== Localization ==
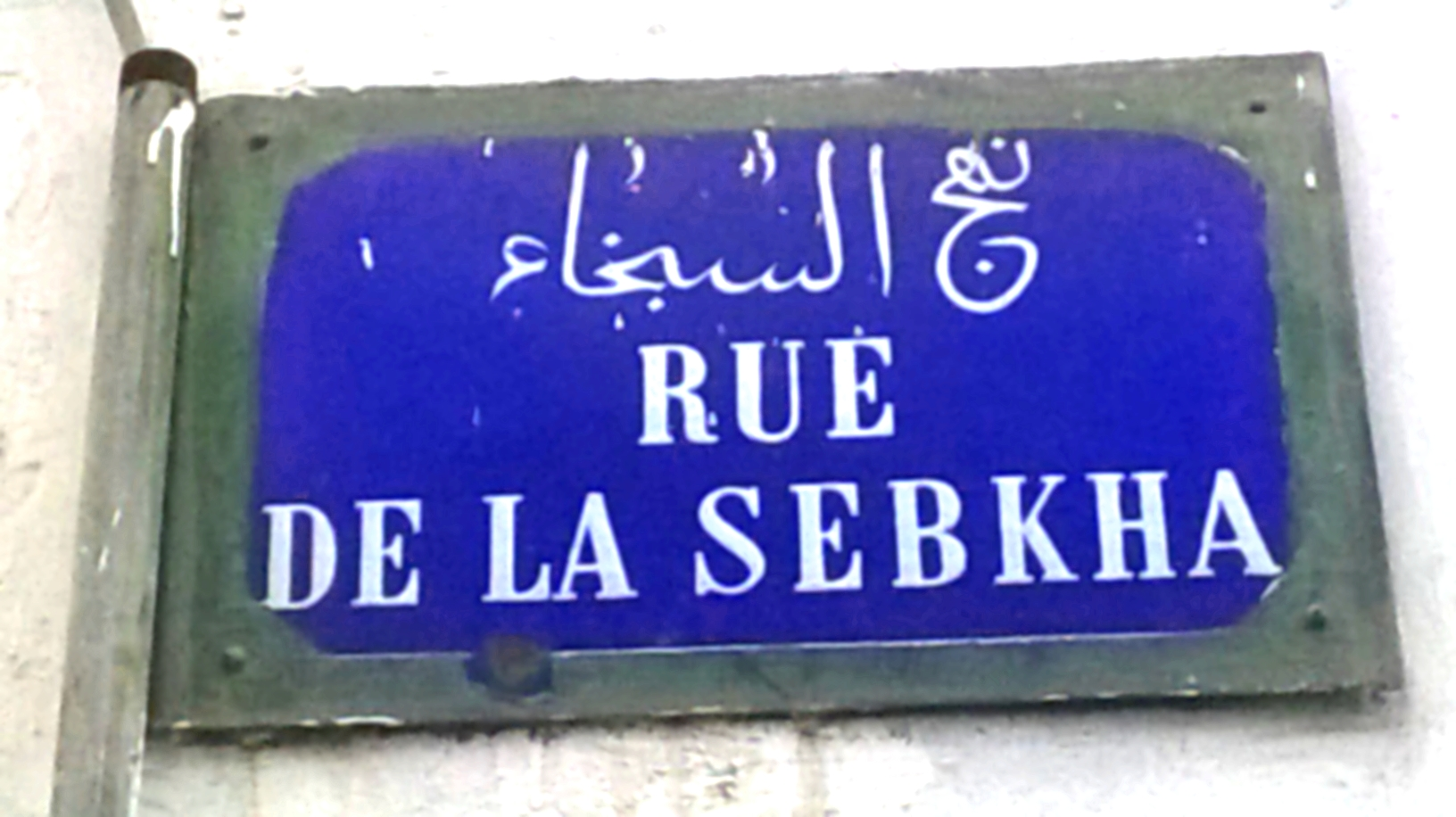
Metallic plaque of El Sabkha Street

It is located in 59 El Sabkha Street.

== History ==
The mosque was built during the Hafsid era and then restored by the minister Youssef Saheb Ettabaa in 1813.

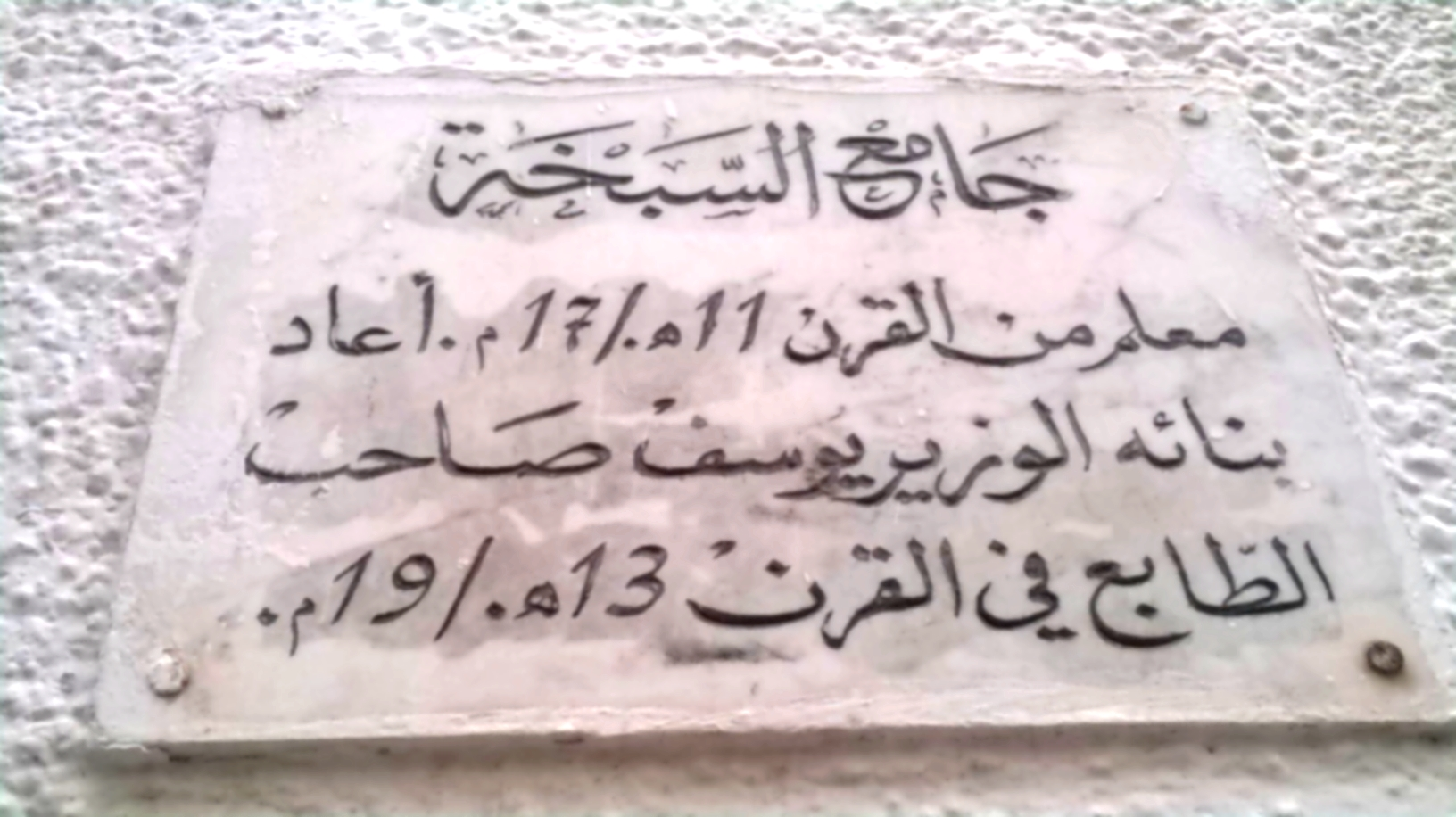
Commemorative plaque of the mosque

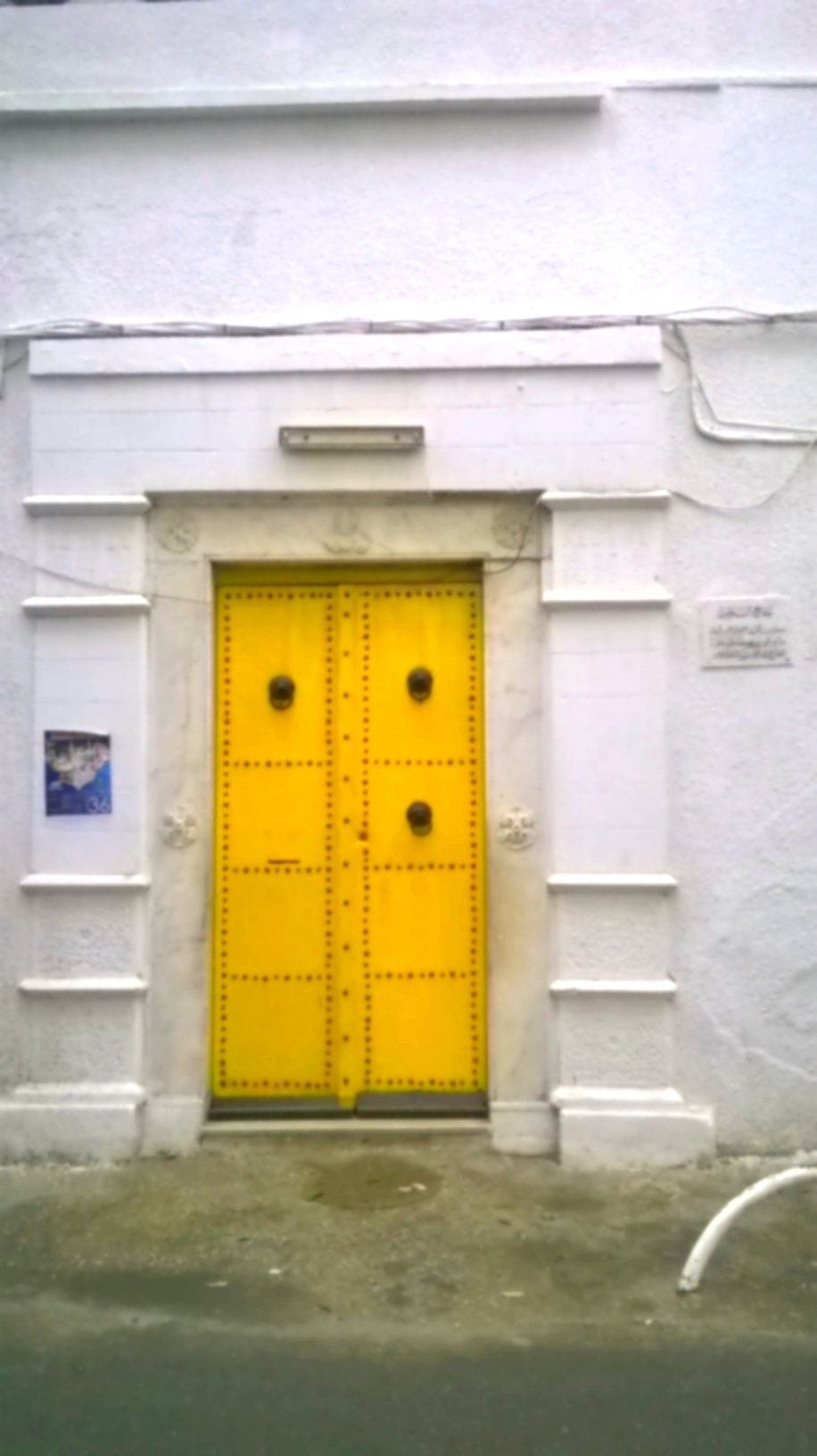
Entrance of the mosque

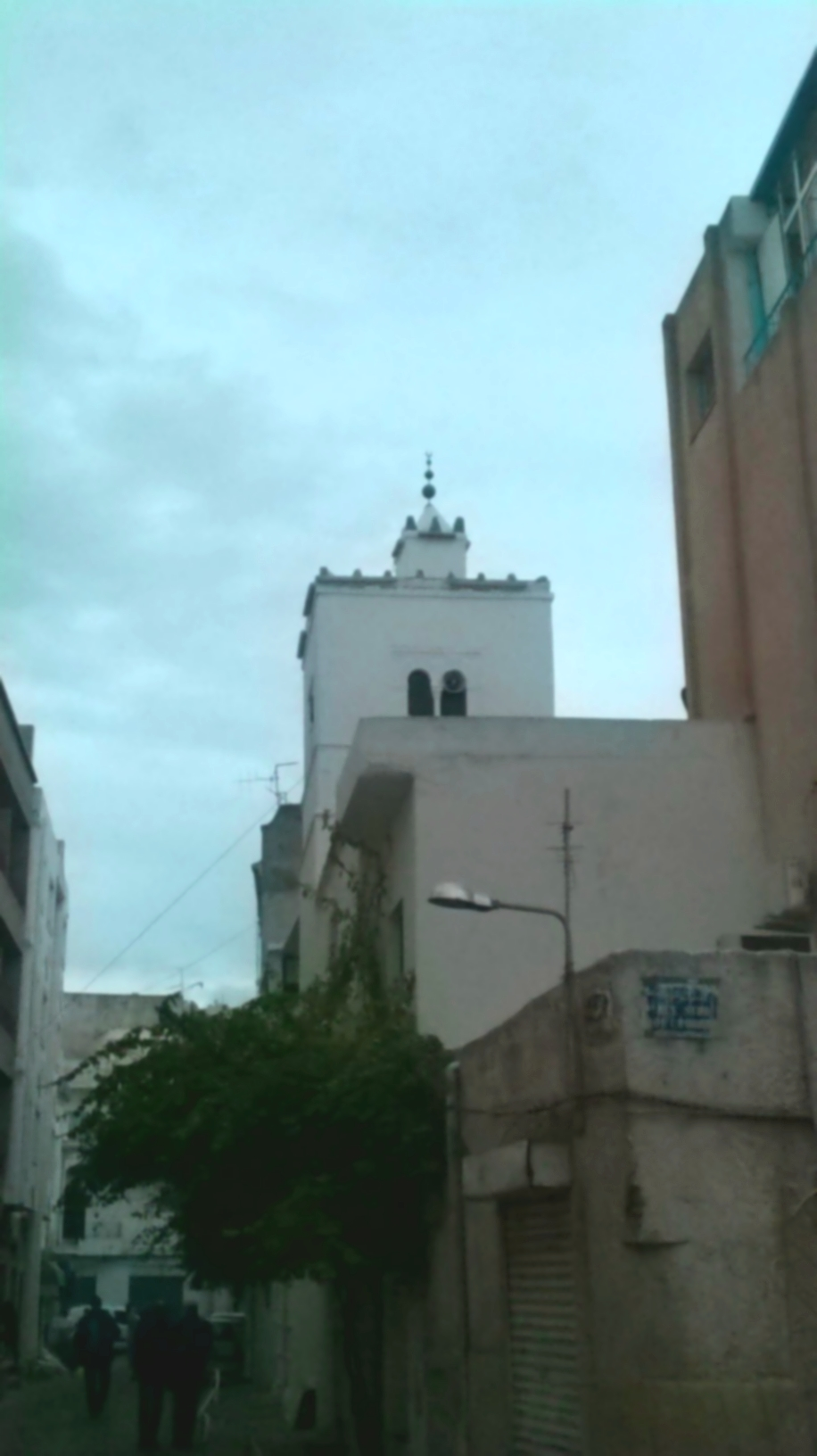
The minaret of the mosque seen from El Sabkha Street
