= Soubhan Allah Mosque =

Mosque in Tunis, Tunisia

- جامع سبحان الل
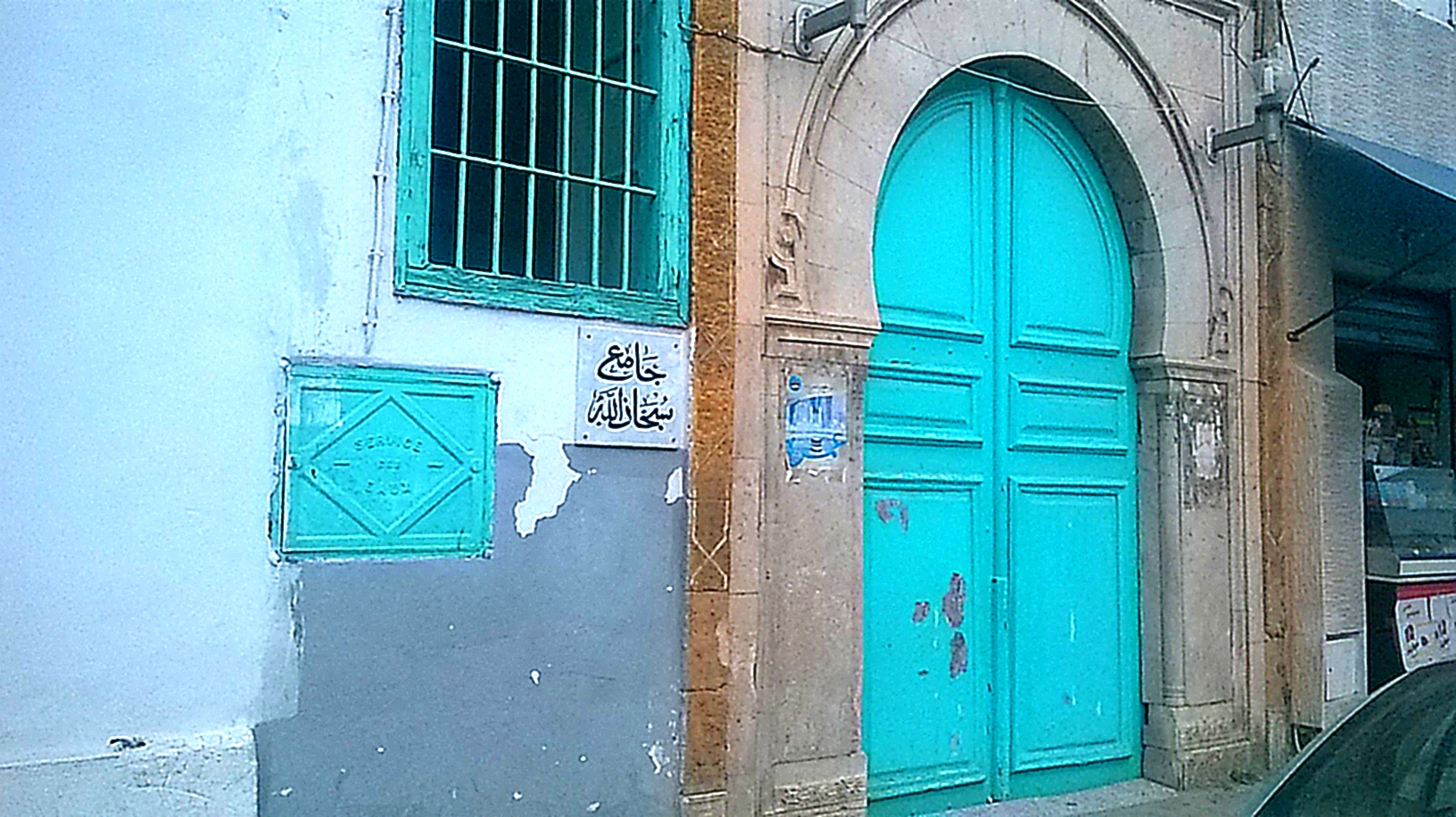

- Location within Tunisia

Religion
- Affiliation: Sunni Islam

Location
- Location: Tunis, Tunisia
- Interactive map of Soubhan Allah Mosque
- Coordinates: 36.804996944444°N 10.170211666667°E

Architecture
- Type: Mosque

The Soubhan Allah Mosque is a mosque located in the Bab Souika arrondissement in Tunis, Tunisia. This mosque was built by the Andalusians, after settling in Tunis, and is dated to around 1624.

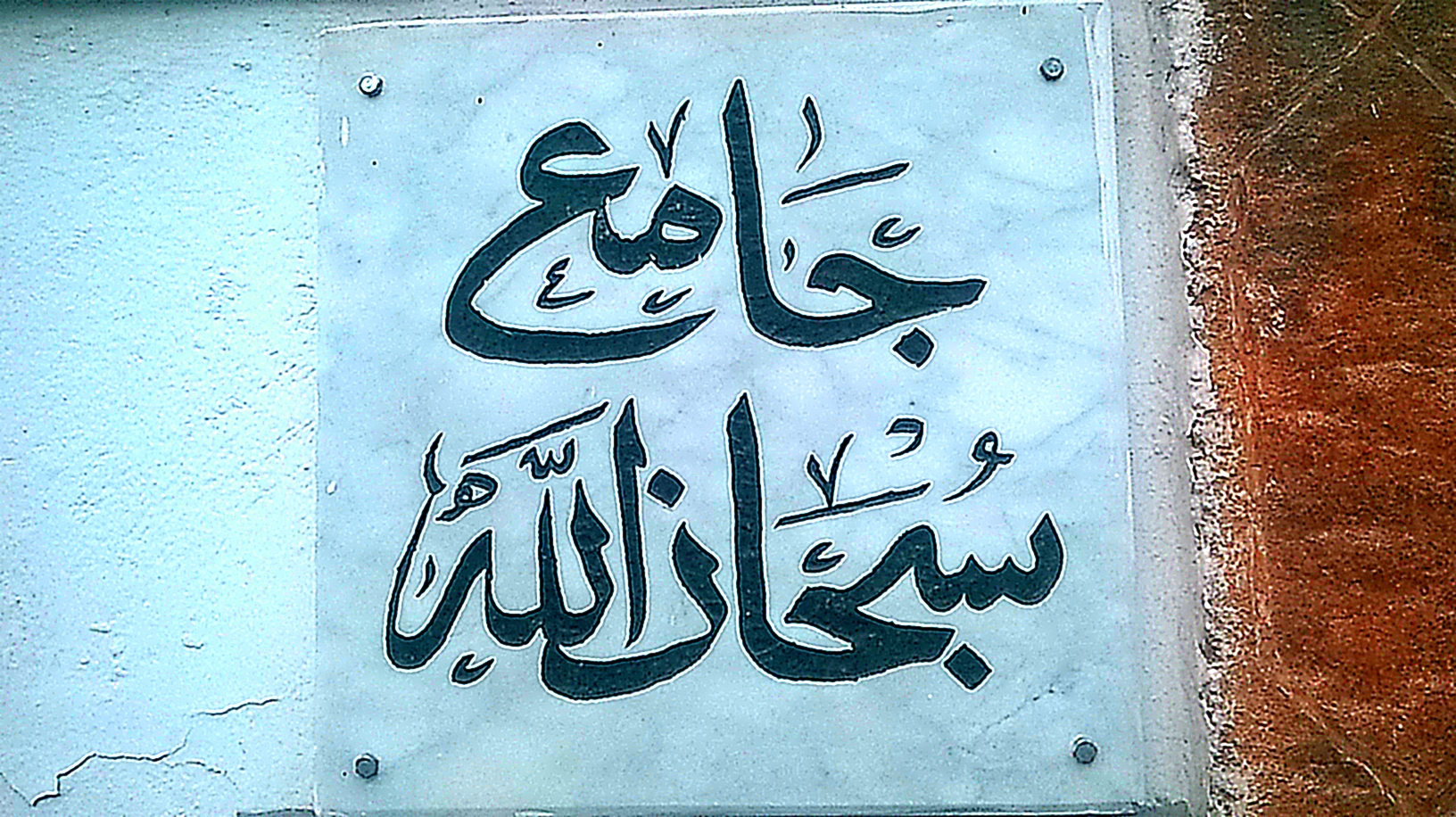
Marble plaque of the mosque

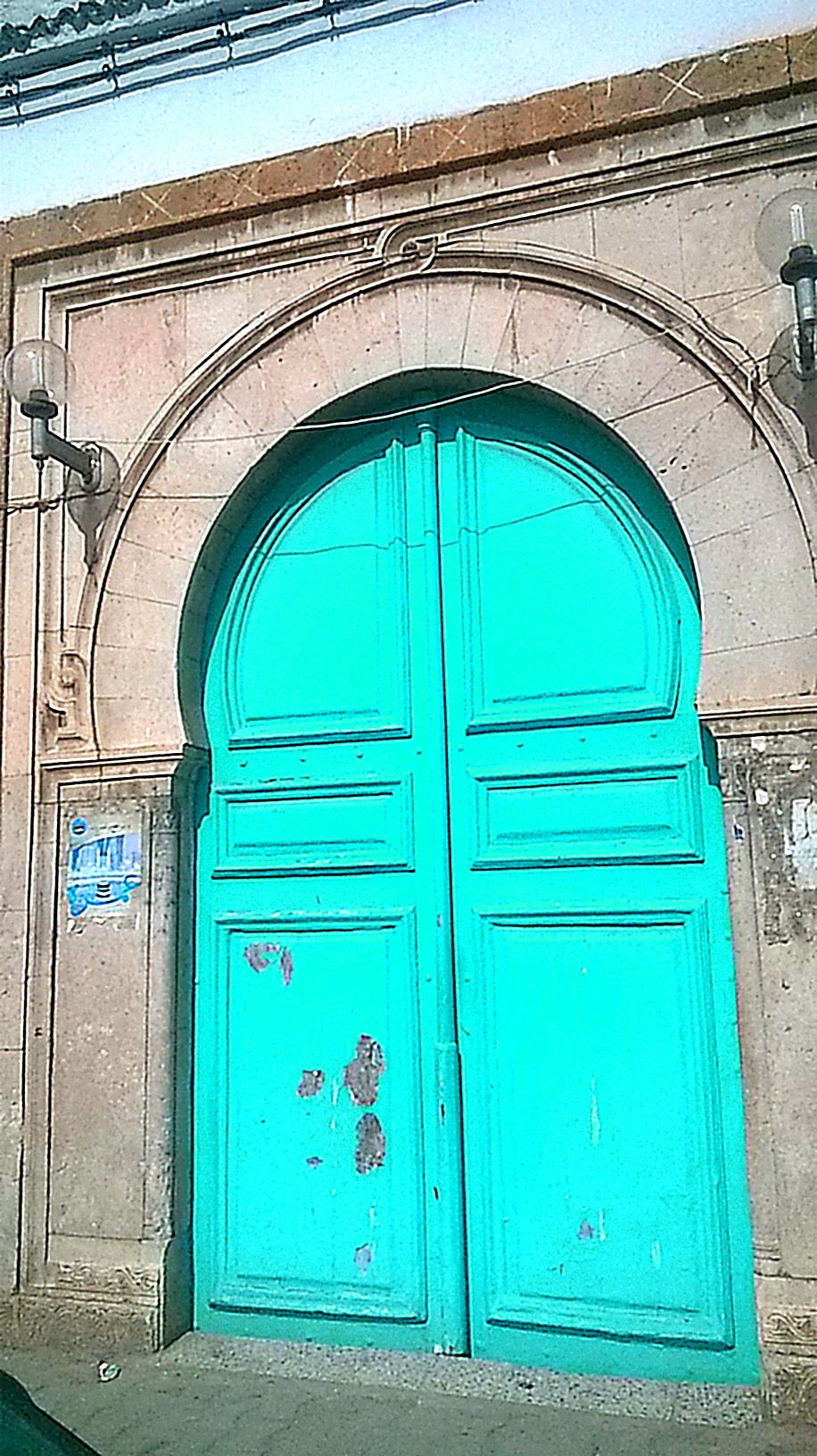
Entrance of the mosque

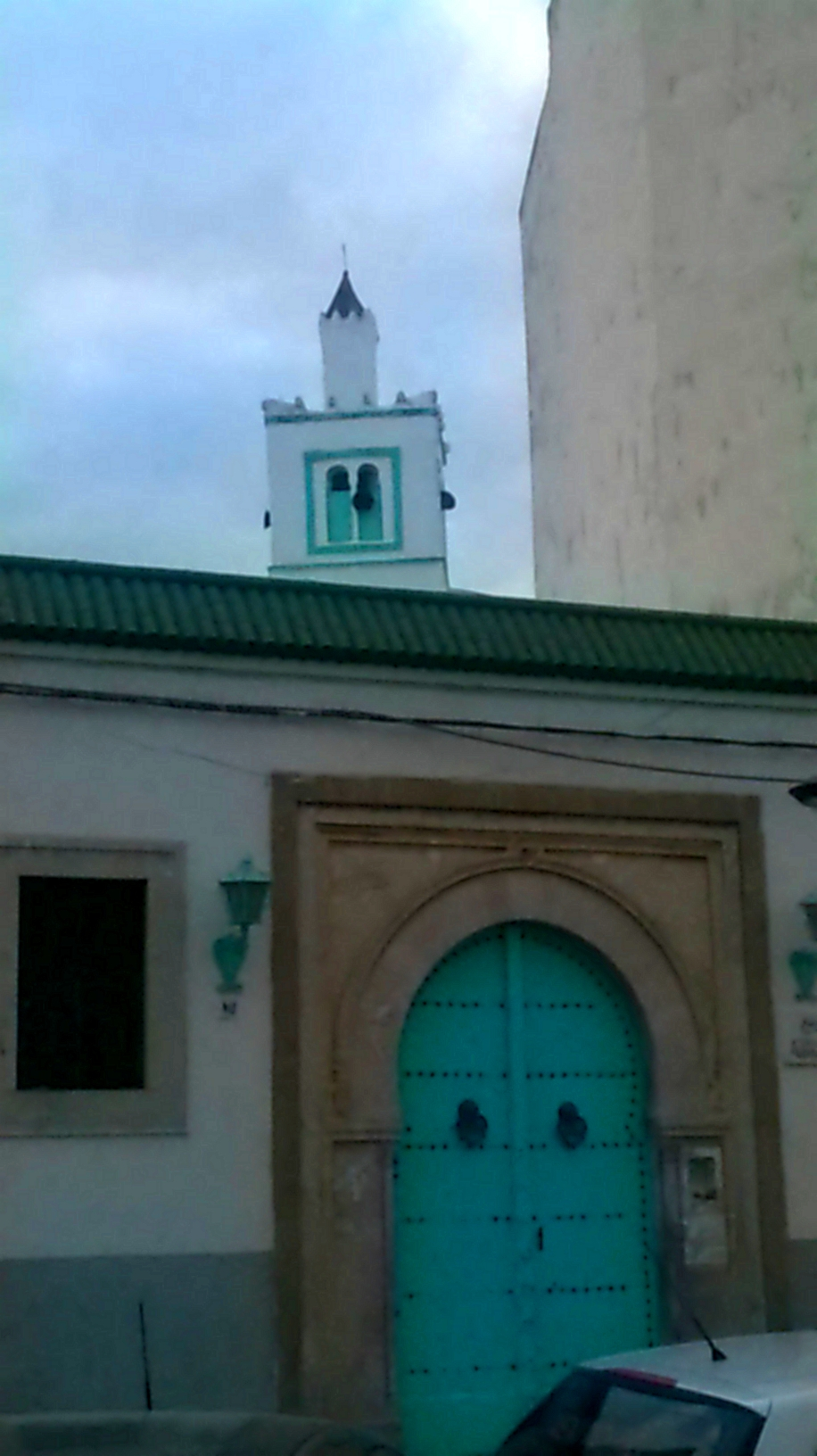
Minaret of the mosque
