= Hajjamine Mosque =

Mosque in Tunis, Tunisia

- جامع الحجامين
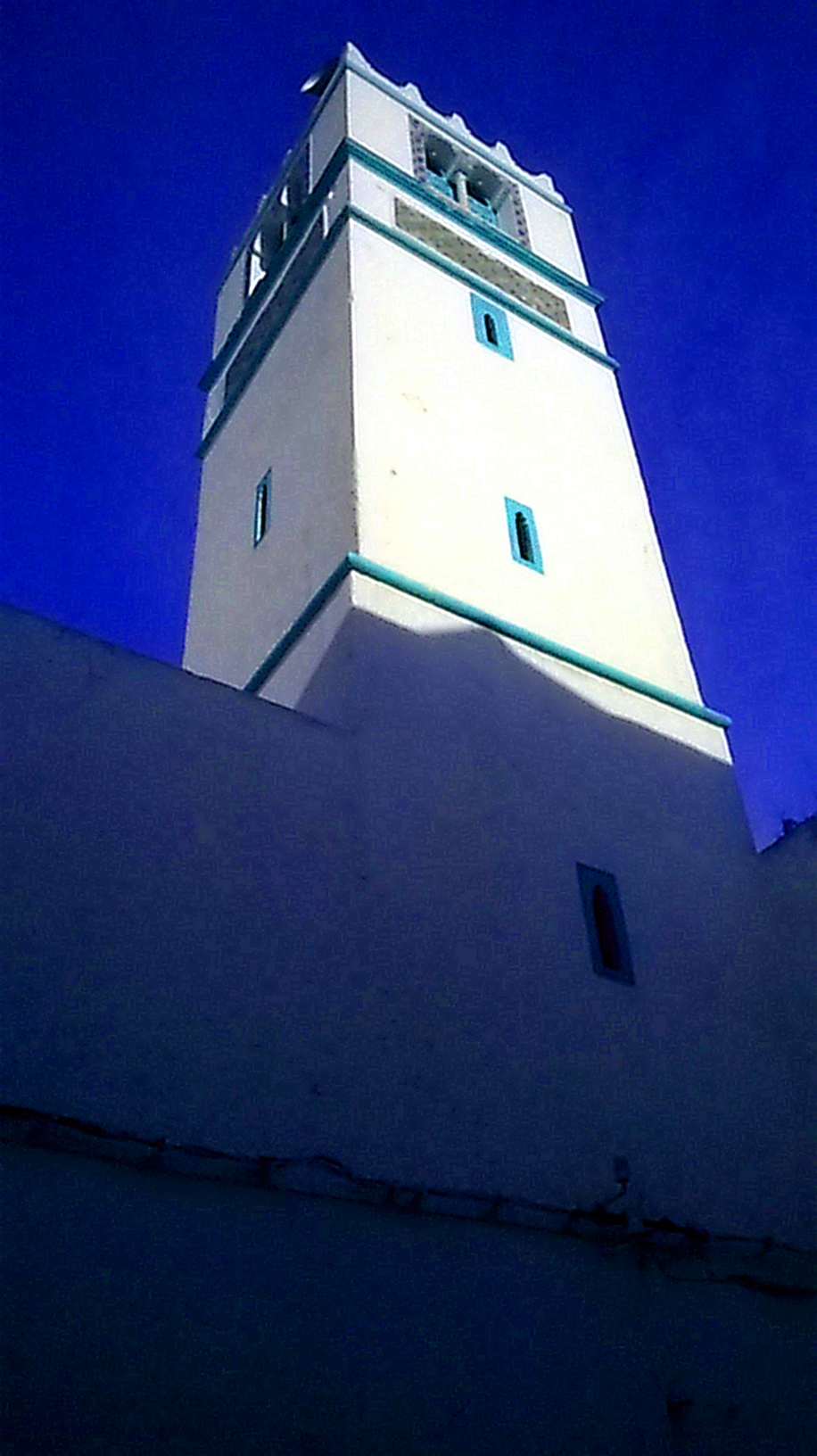

- Location within Tunisia

Religion
- Affiliation: Islam
- Branch/tradition: Sunni

Location
- Location: Tunis, Tunisia
- Interactive map of Hajjamine Mosque
- Coordinates: 36.791121°N 10.172299°E

Architecture
- Type: Mosque

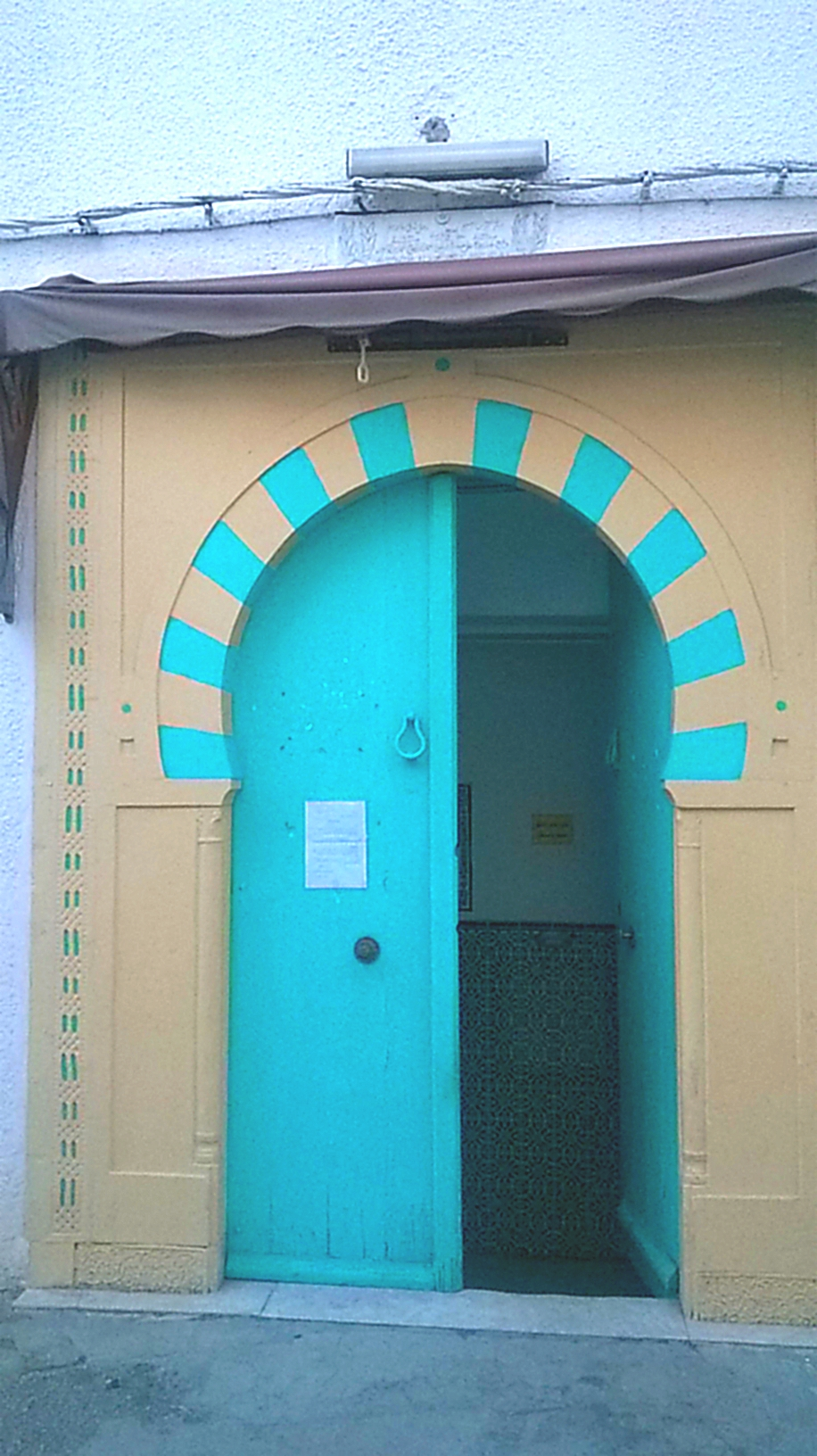
Gate of El-Hajjamine Mosque

Hajjamine Mosque (Arabic: جامع الحجامين) is a mosque in Tunis, Tunisia, located in the Beb jedid arrondissement. The mosque was restored by cheikh El Haj Ahmed Ben Lamine in 1931.

== Localization ==
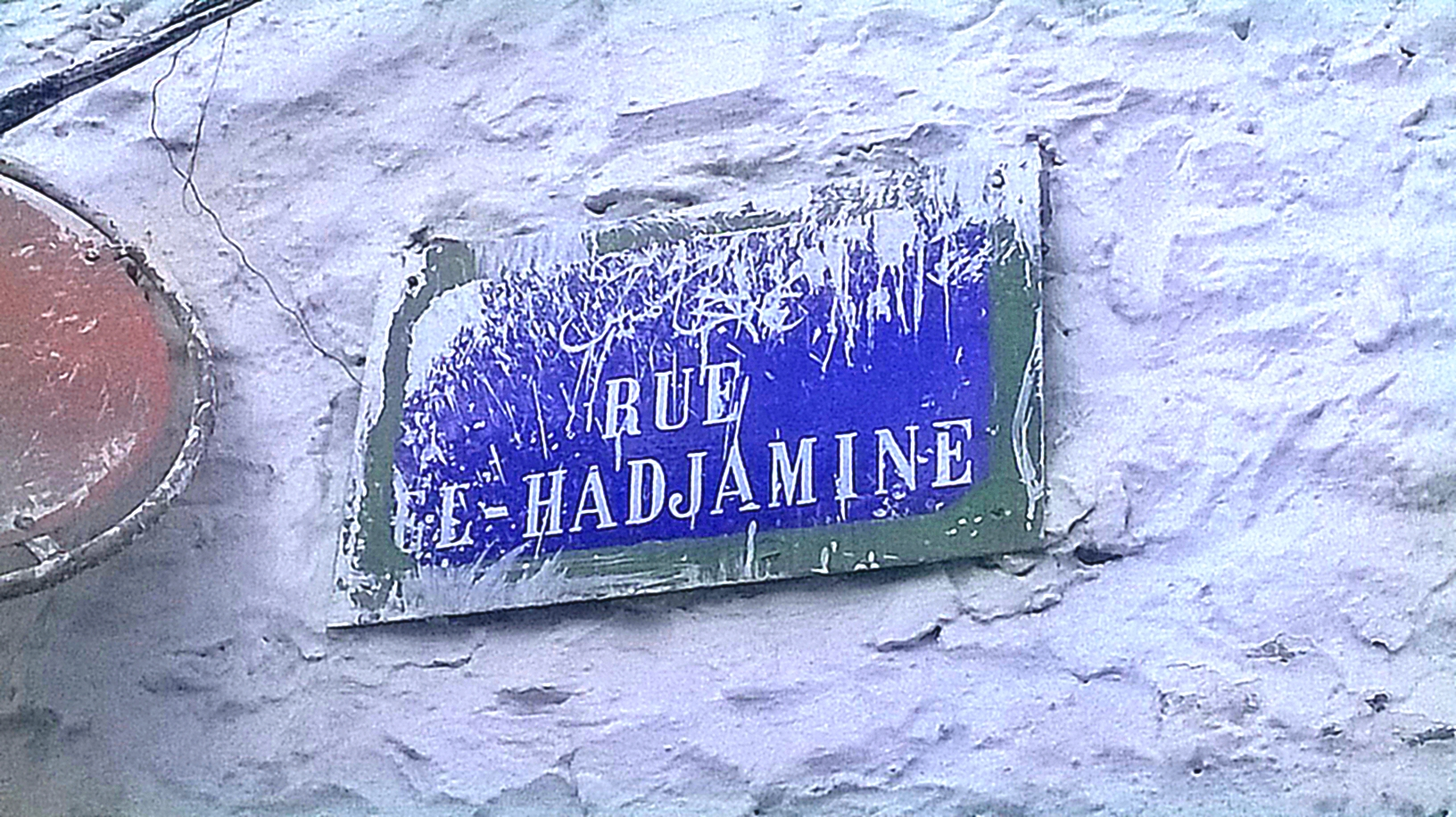
Metallic plaque of El Hajjamine Street

The mosque can be found in 75 El Hajjamine Street near Bab Jedid, one of the Medina of Tunis doors.
