= El Omrane Mosque =

Mosque in Tunis, Tunisia

Religion
- Affiliation: Sunni Islam

Location
- Location: Tunis, Tunisia

Architecture
- Type: Mosque
- Established: 1935

El Omrane Mosque is a mosque in Tunis, Tunisia, located in the El Omrane arrondissement. The mosque was constructed in 1935 to accommodate the people of the district.
