= Bab Jazira Mosque =

Mosque in Tunis, Tunisia

- جامع باب الجزيرة
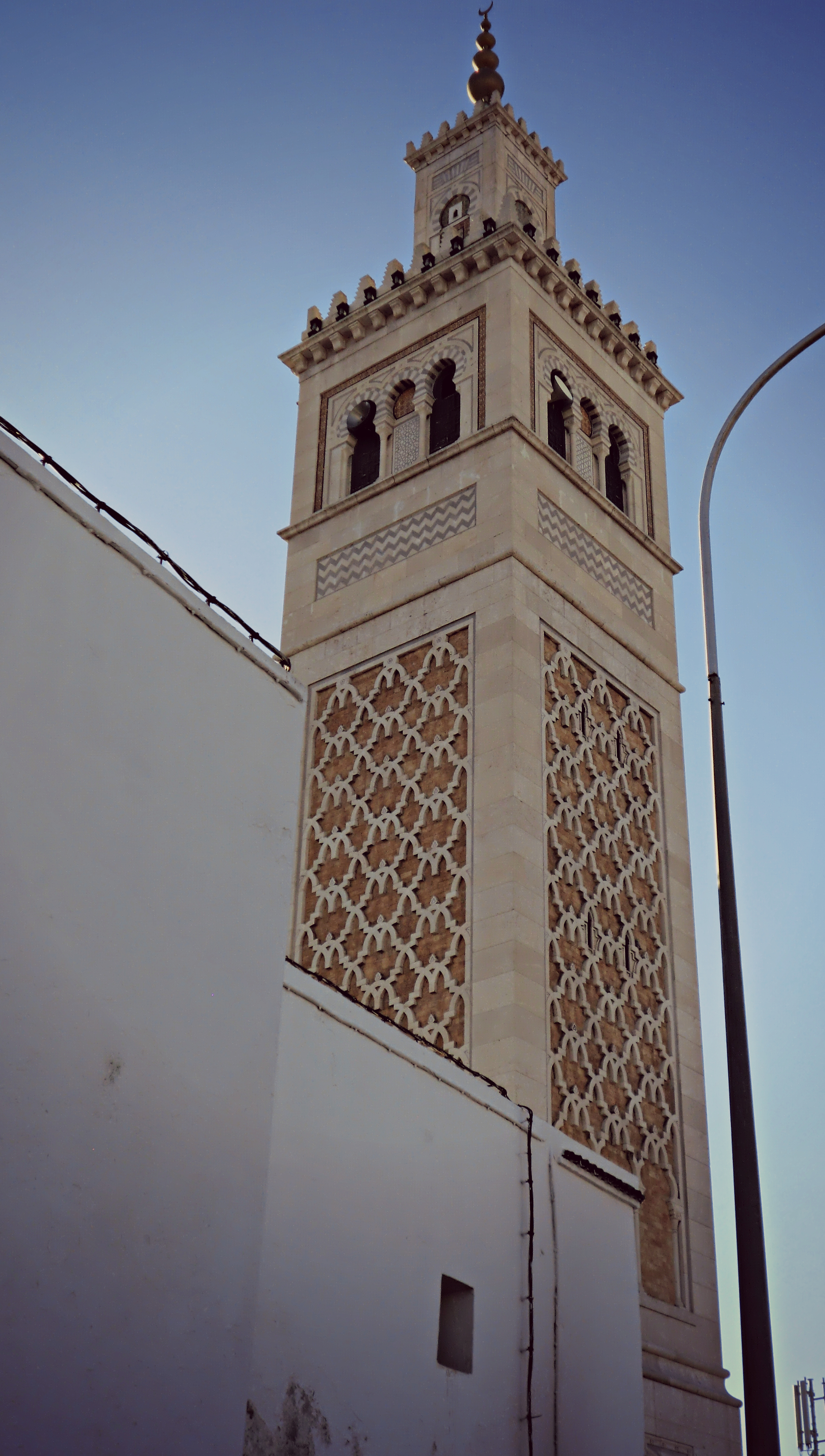

- Location within Tunisia

Religion
- Affiliation: Islam
- Branch/tradition: Sunni

Location
- Location: Tunis, Tunisia
- Coordinates: 36.7920°N 10.1765°E

Architecture
- Type: mosque

Bab Jazira Mosque (Arabic: جامع باب الجزيرة), Tunisian Arabic: Jēma' Bēb Dzīra, also known as El Jenaïz mosque, is a mosque in Tunis, Tunisia.

== Localization ==
This mosque is Located in the Sidi Bashir arrondissement, in Al Jazira square.

== History ==
It was built in 1710 by Cheikh Yahia Esslimani. The minarets were restored in 1907.

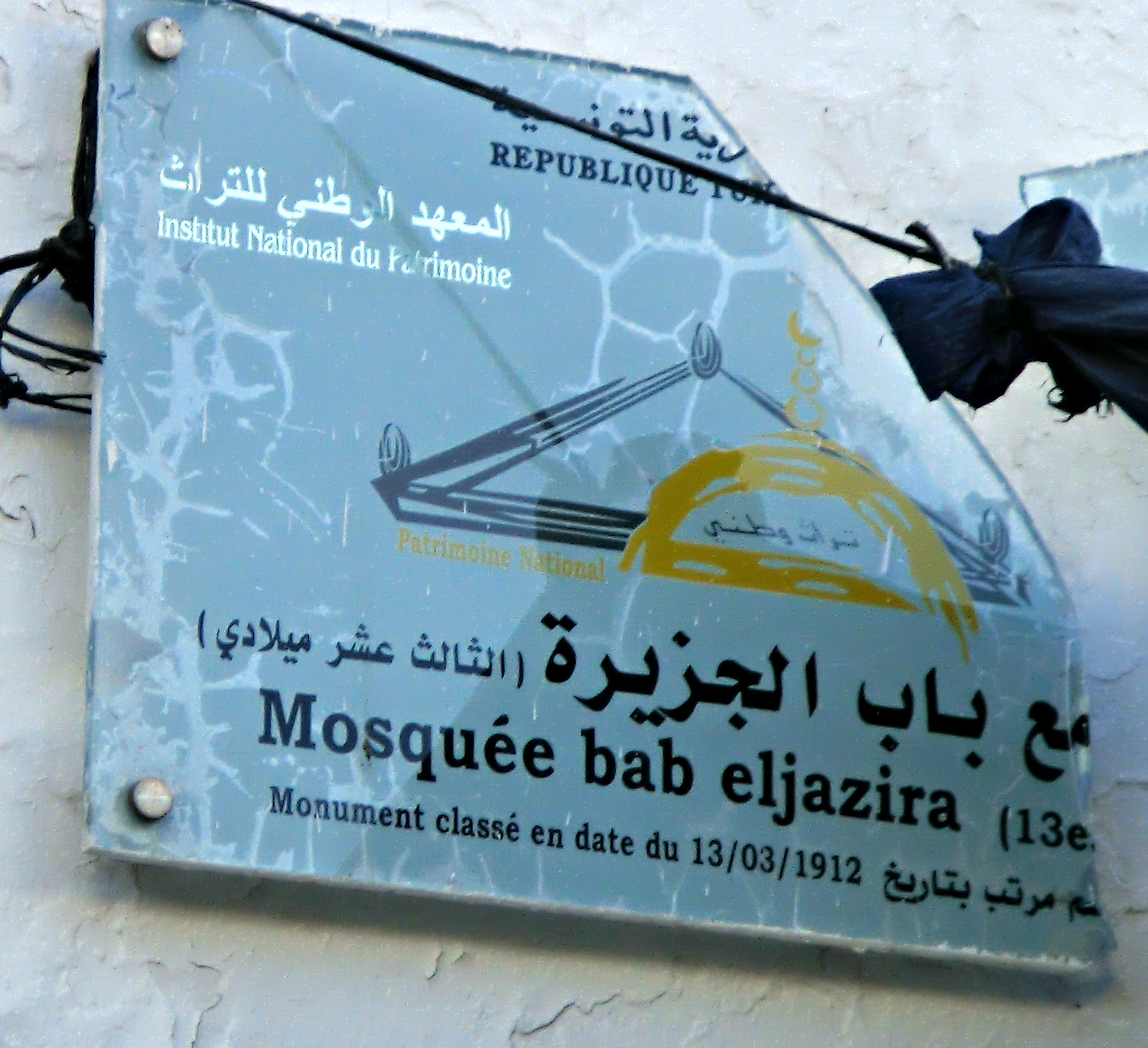
Bab Jazira Mosque

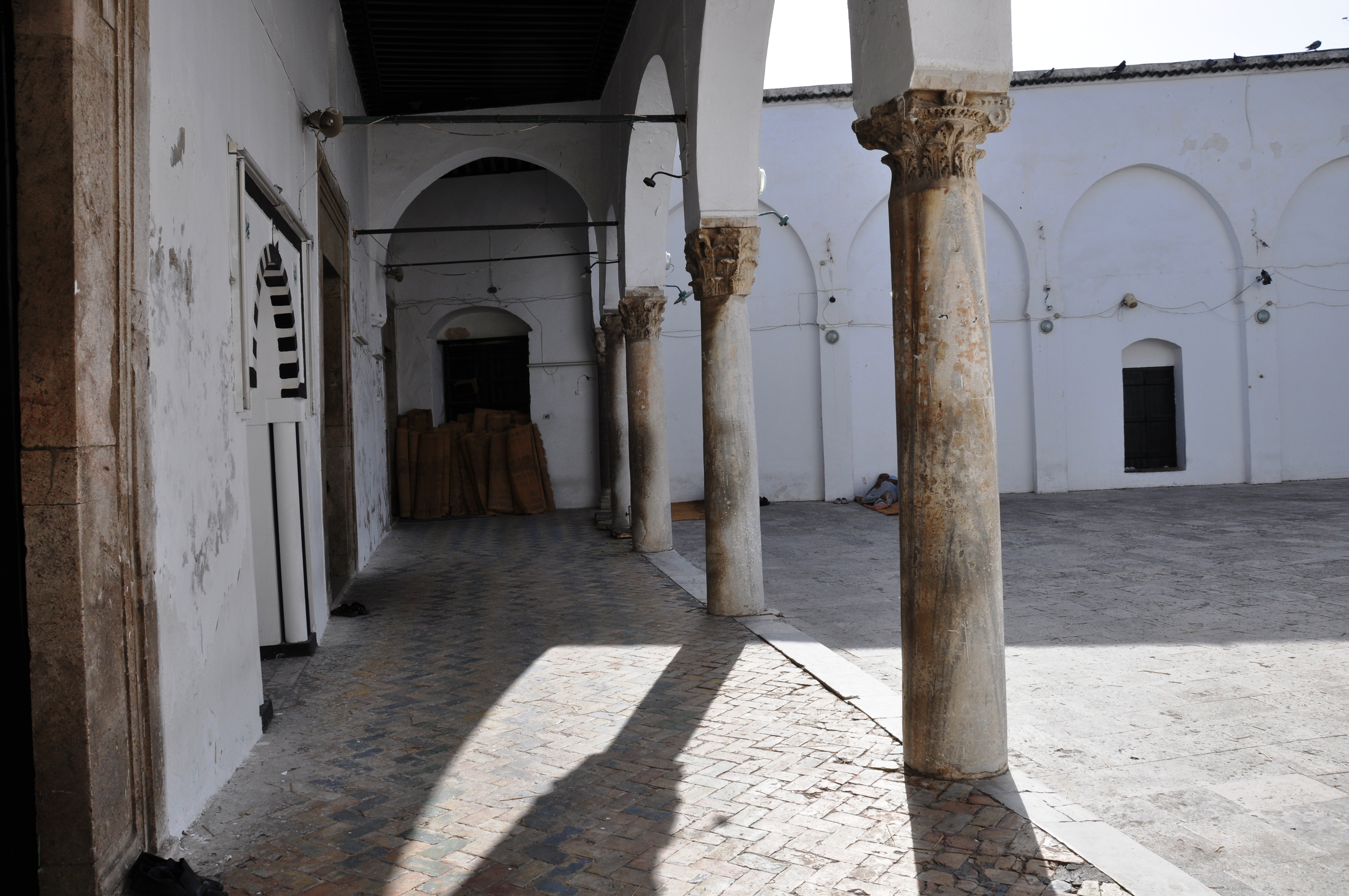
Arches of the mosque

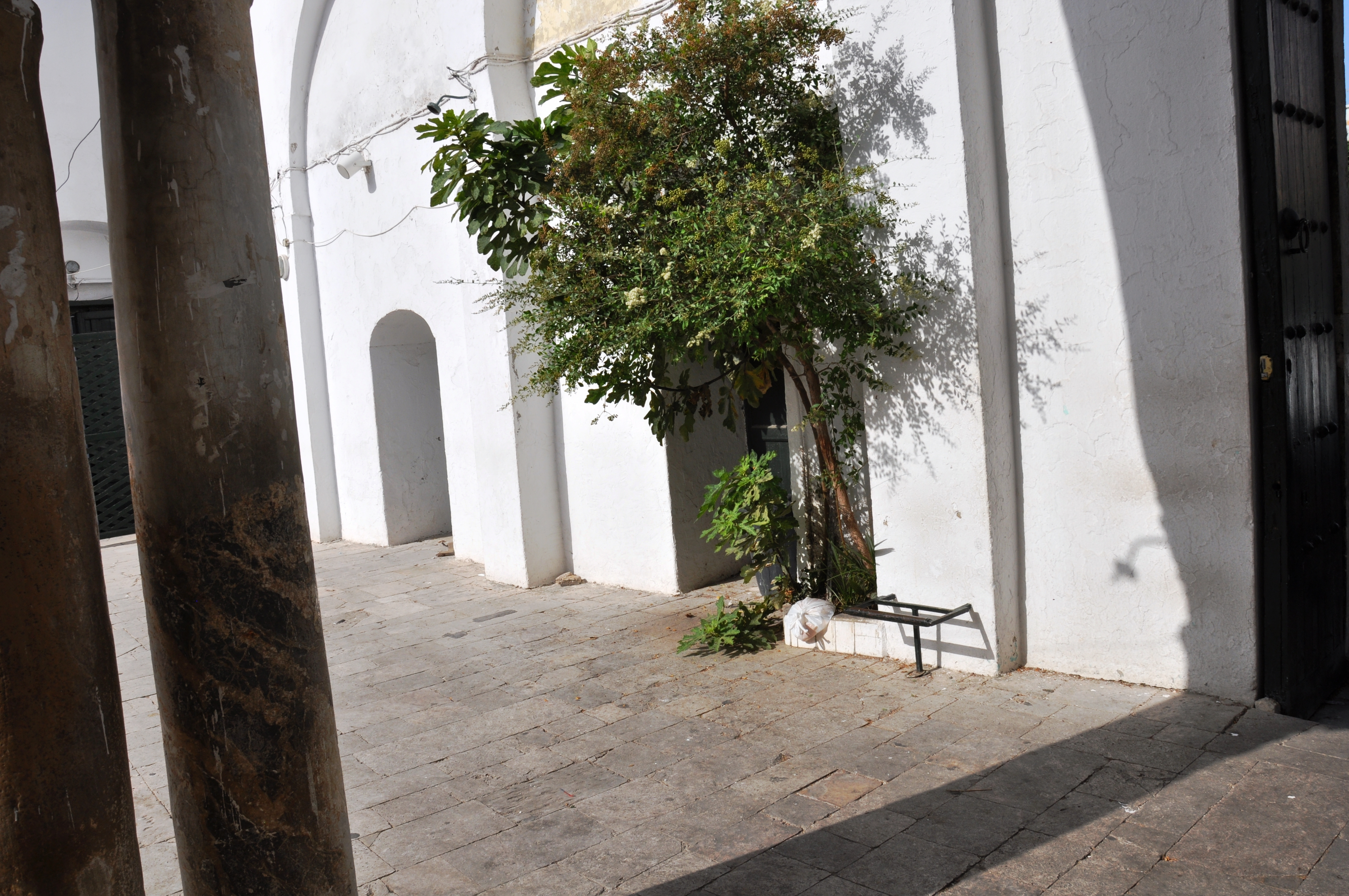
Hall of the mosque

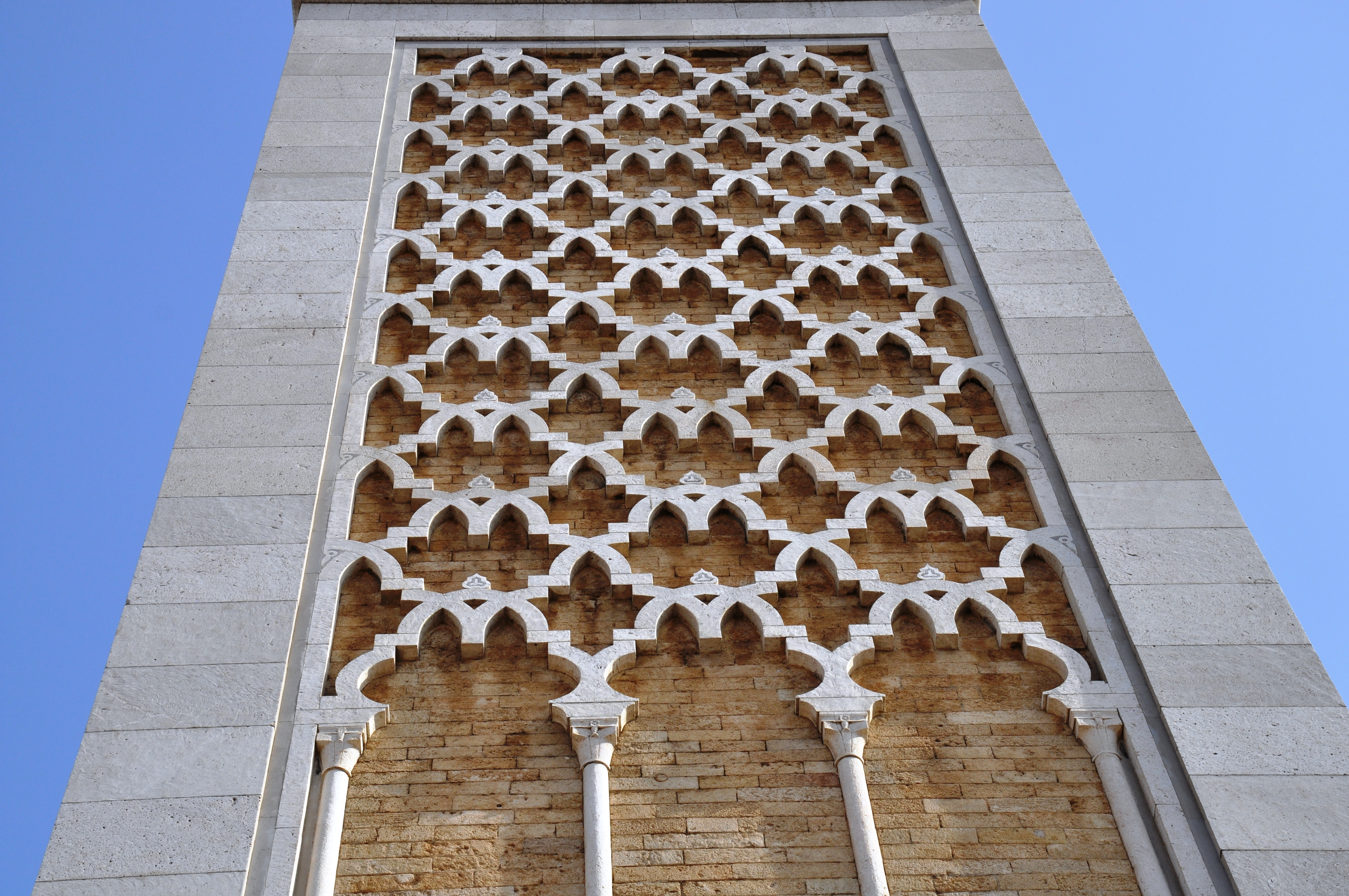
Decoration of the minaret

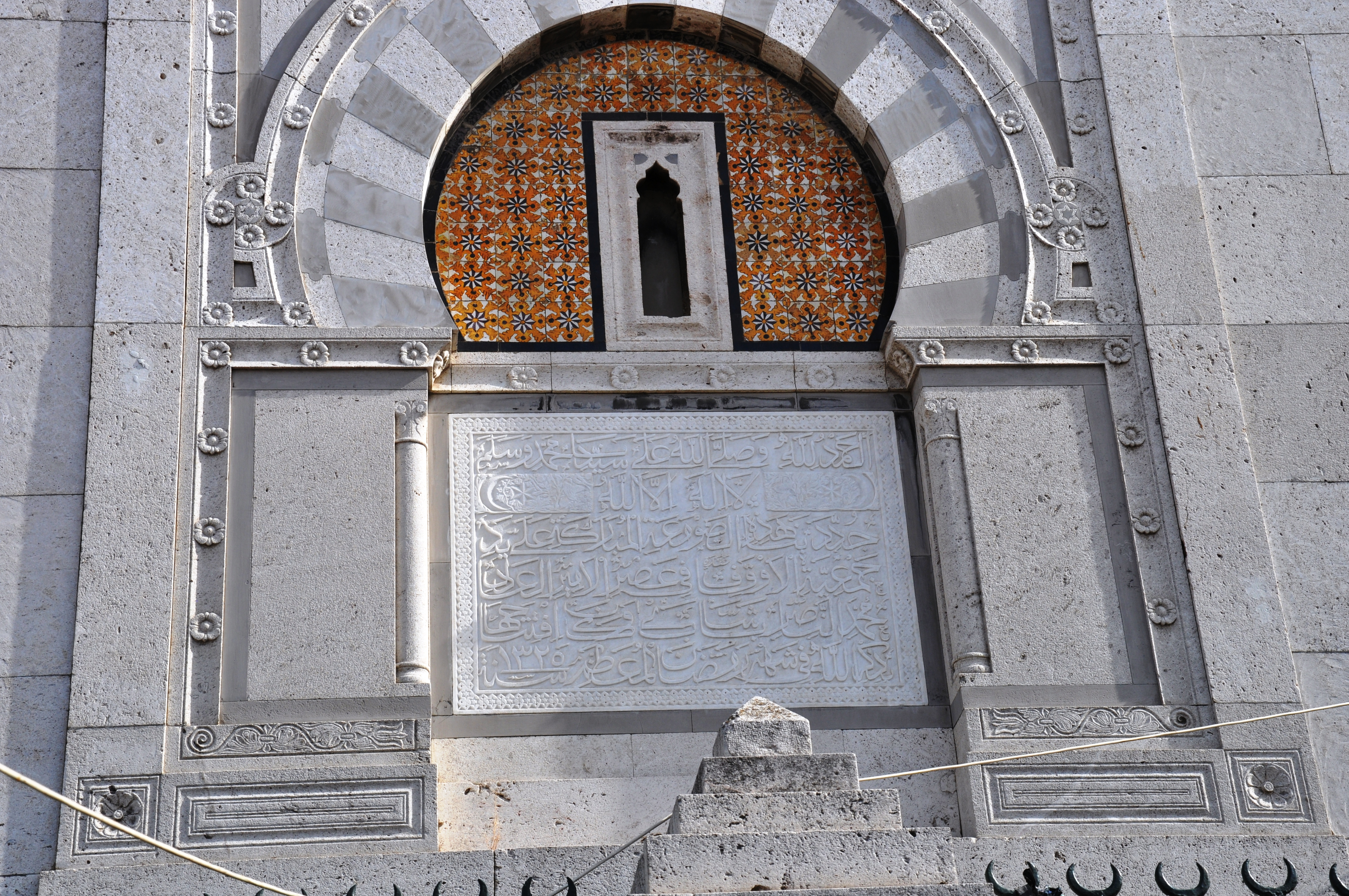
Decoration of the facade
