= Sidi Bellagh Mosque =

Mosque in Tunis, Tunisia

- جامع سيدي البلاغ
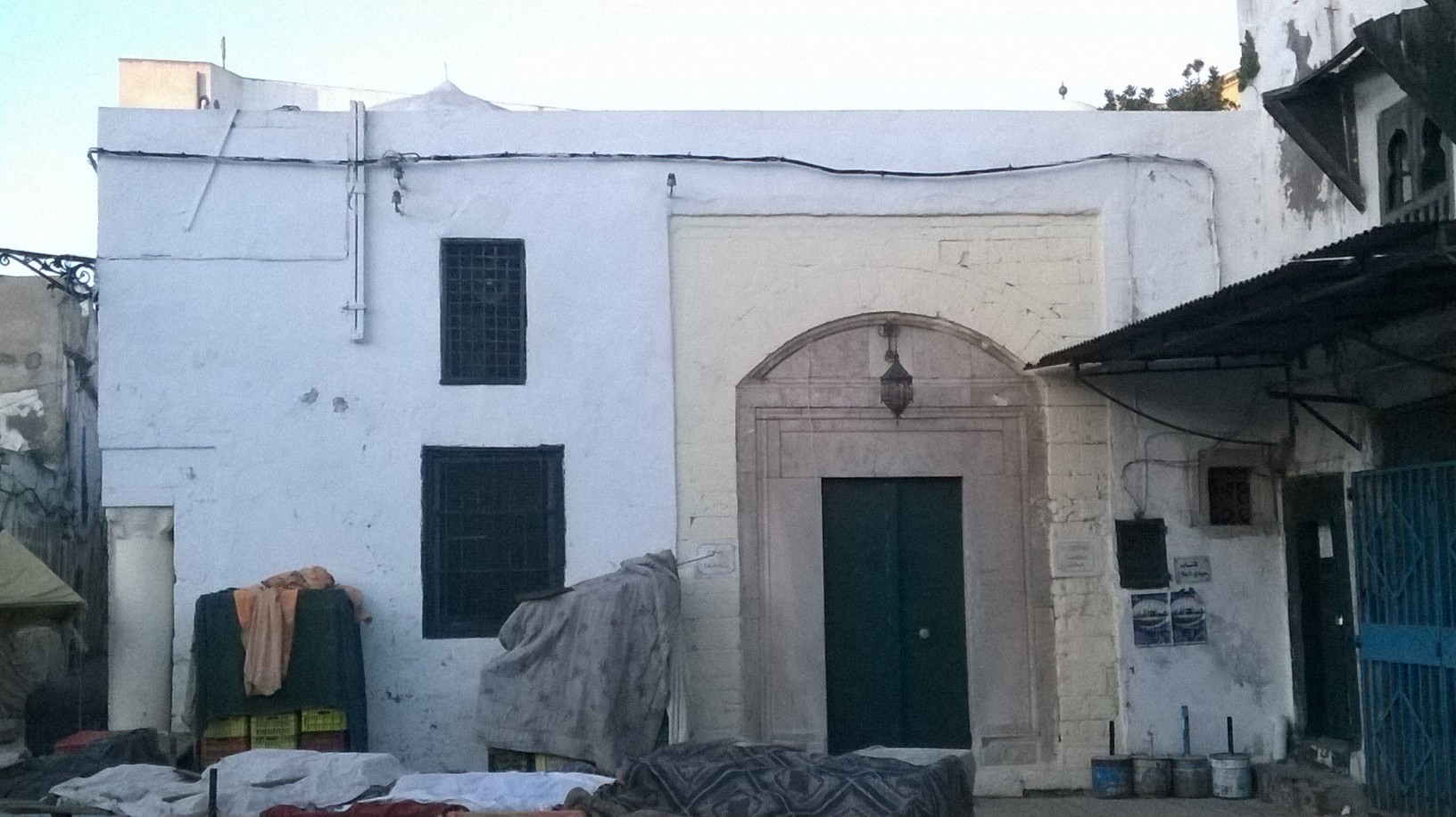

- Location within Tunisia

Religion
- Affiliation: Islam

Location
- Location: Tunisia
- Interactive map of Sidi Bellagh Mosque
- Coordinates: 36.807535°N 10.167221°E

Architecture
- Type: mosque

Sidi Bellagh Mosque (Arabic: جامع سيدي البلاغ),‌ is a Tunisian mosque located in the Halfaouine hood in the northern suburb of the medina of Tunis.

== Localization ==
It can be found in 156 Halfaouine Street next to Saheb Ettabaâ Mosque.

== Etymology ==
The mosque got its name from a saint called cheikh Abi Kacem El Bellagh (Arabic: الشيخ أبي قاسم البلاغ) who lived in the 8th century and who was known for his morals and his wisdom.

== History ==
It was probably built in the 9th century. And till this day, it serves for the five daily prayers and for the tarawih during ramadan.

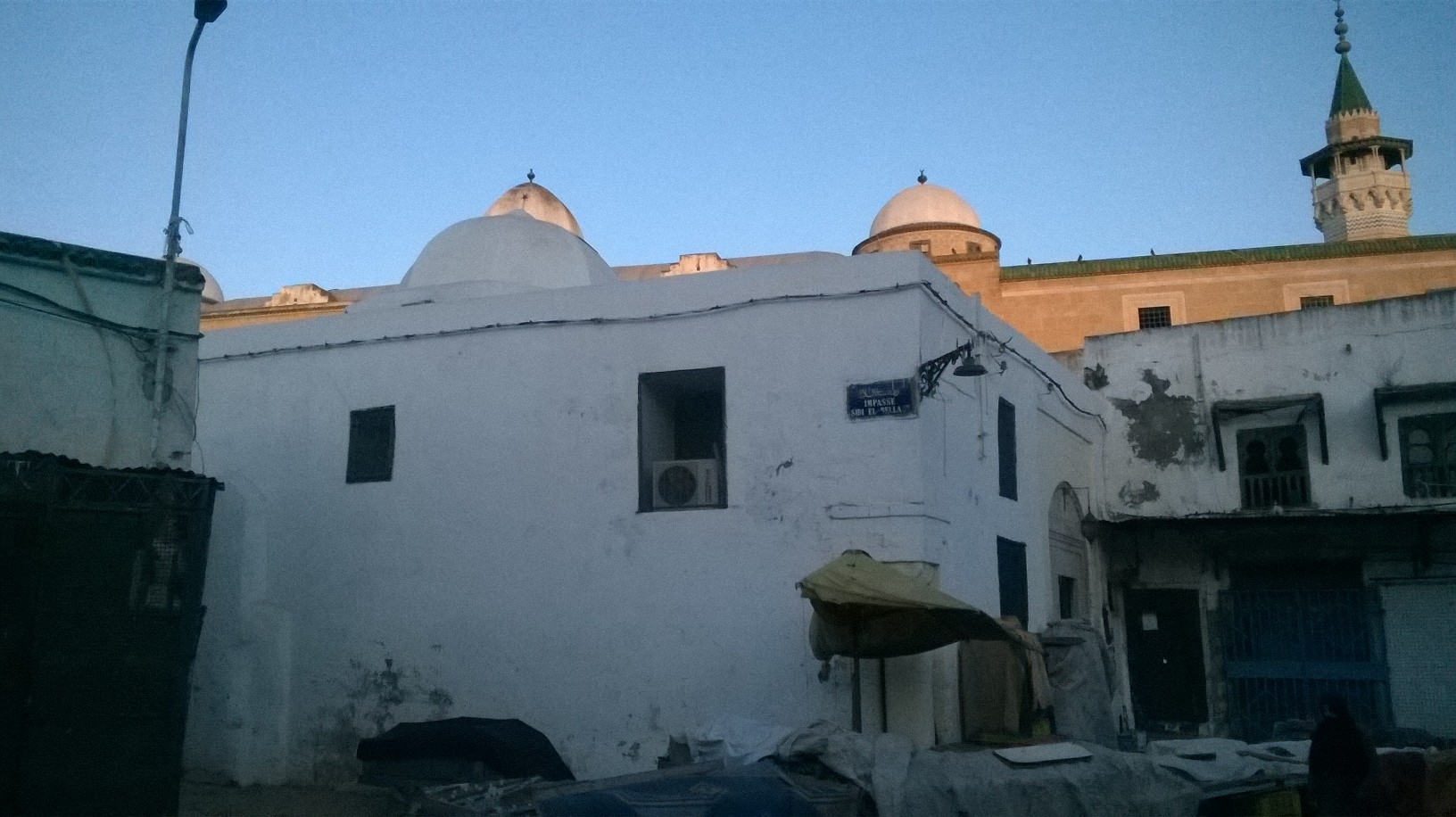
View of the mosque and the Saheb Ettabaâ mosque's minaret behind it.

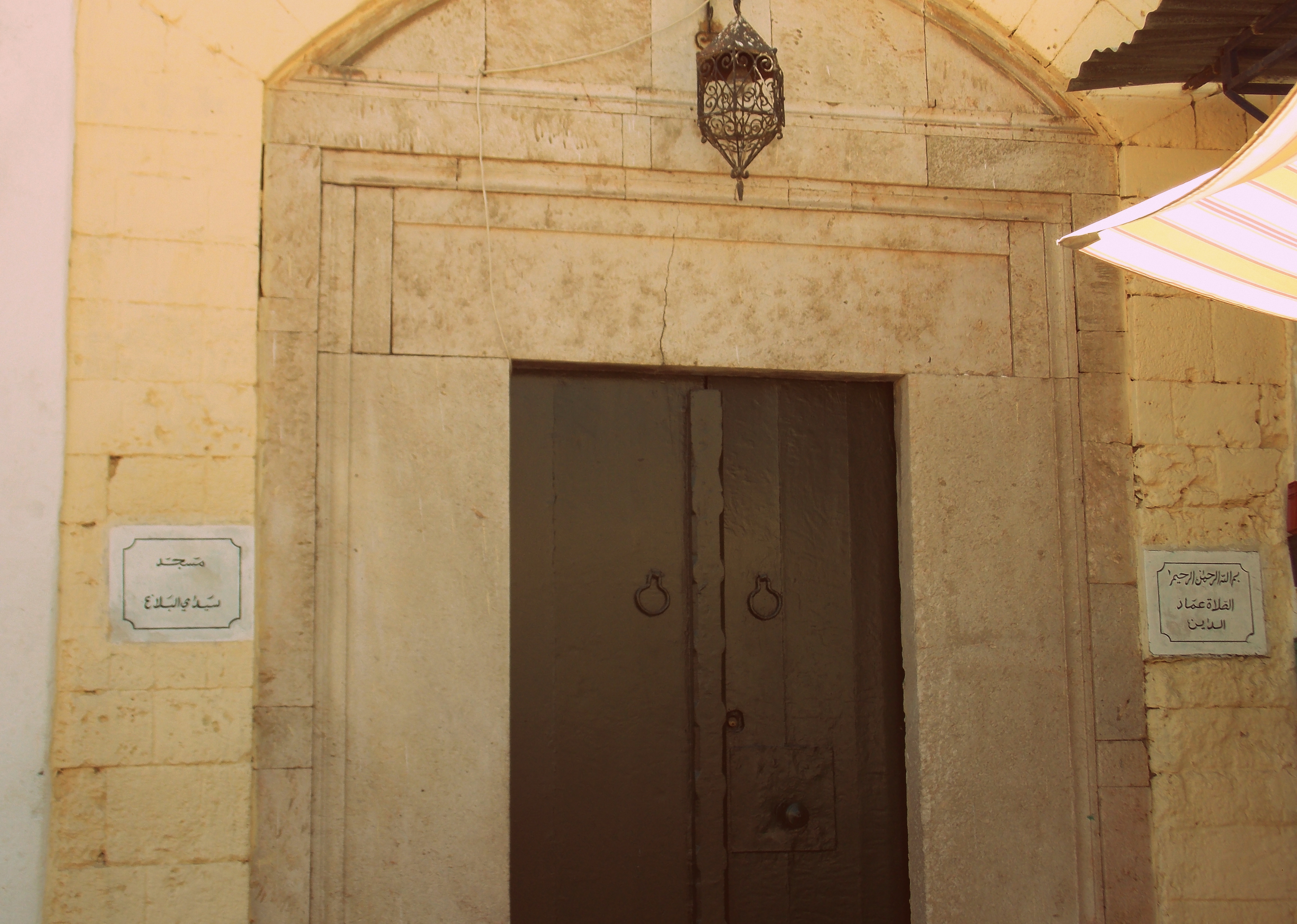
PEntrance of the mosque

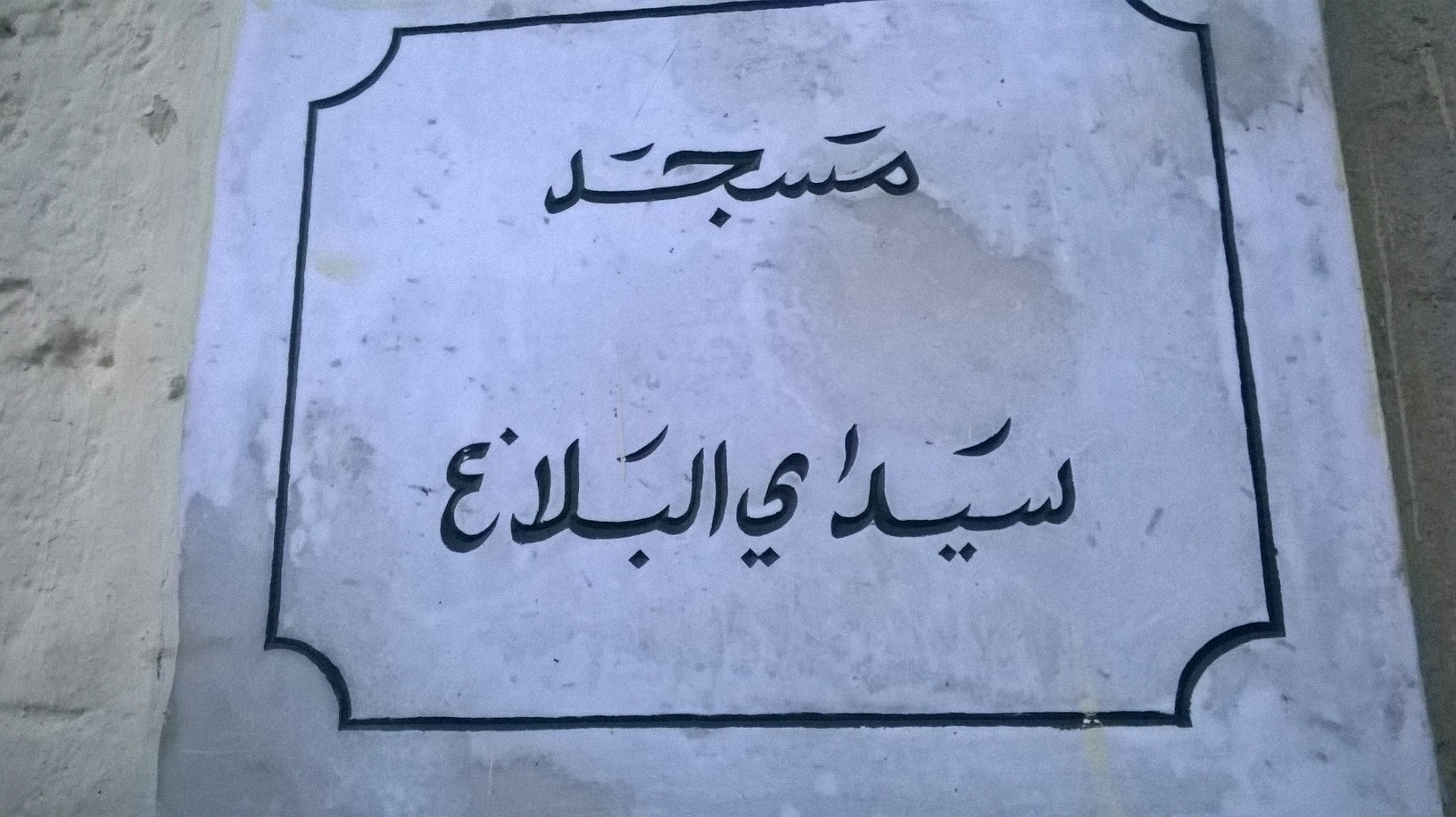
Plaque with the name of the mosque

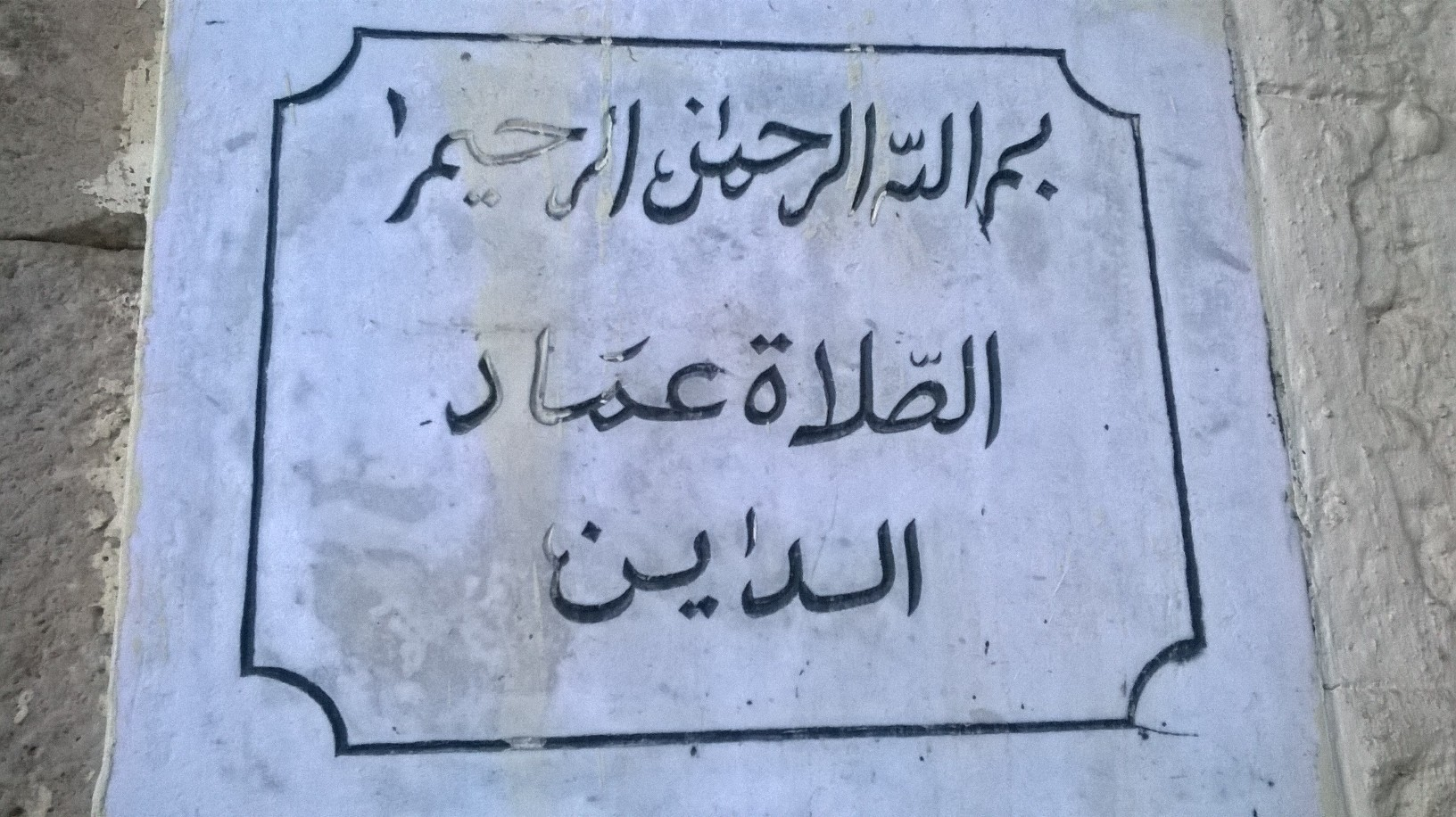
A plaque with a hadith
