= Saheb Ettabaâ Mosque =

Mosque in Tunis, Tunisia

- جامع صاحب الطابع
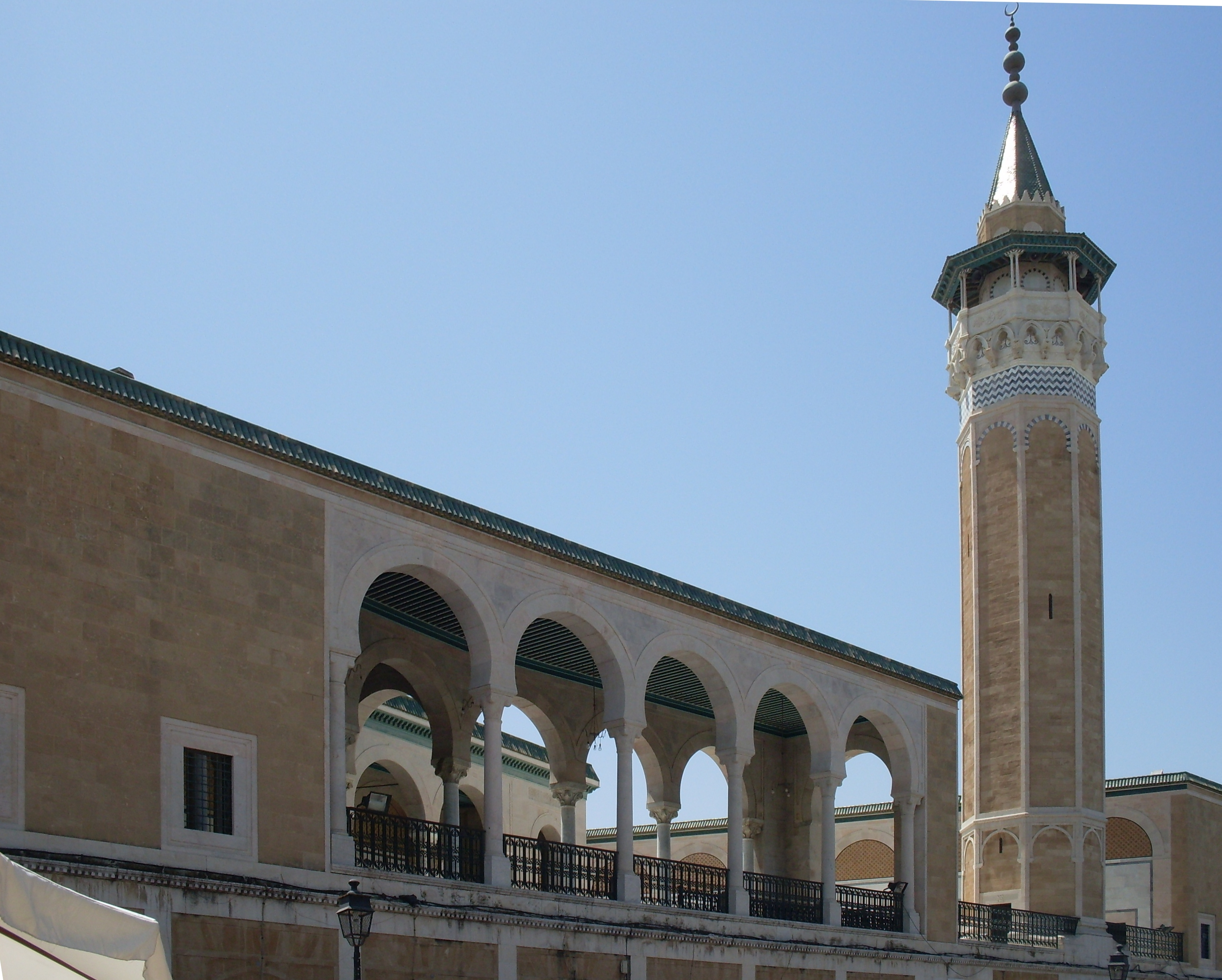

Religion
- Affiliation: Sunni Islam
- Status: Active

Location
- Location: Medina of Tunis, Tunis
- Country: Tunisia
- Interactive map of Saheb Ettabaâ Mosque
- Coordinates: 36°48′28″N 10°10′00″E

Architecture
- Architect: Sassi ibn Frija
- Type: Mosque
- Style: Moorish architecture; Italian architecture; Ottoman architecture
- Founder: Youssef Saheb Ettabaa
- Groundbreaking: 1808
- Completed: 1814

Specifications
- Height (max): 31 m (104 ft)
- Dome: 7
- Minaret: 1

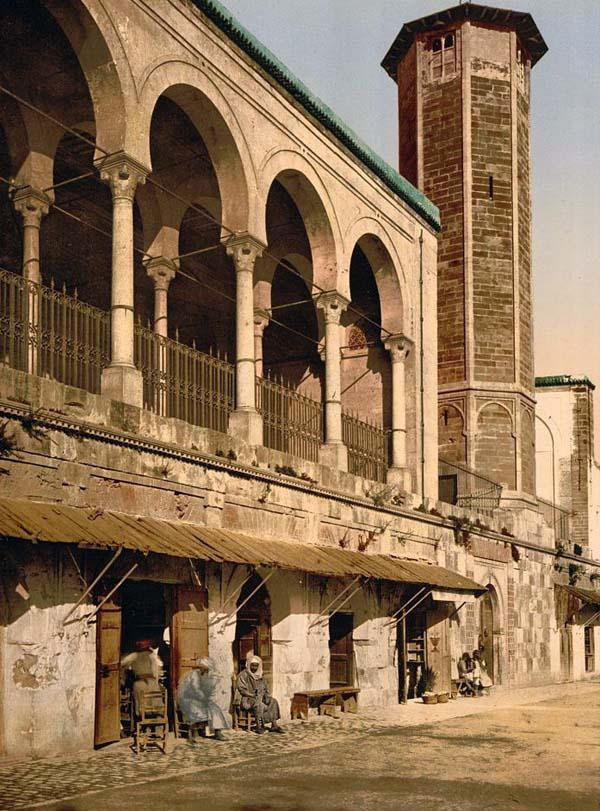
Mosque in 1899

Saheb Ettabaâ Mosque, also known as Youssef Saheb Al Tabaa Mosque, is a mosque in Tunis, Tunisia, located in the Halfaouine area of the city. It is an official Historical Monument. It is the last great mosque built in Tunis before the establishment of the French protectorate in 1881.

== History ==
On 4 December 1947, following the UN partition plan for Palestine on 29 November, more than 3000 pro-Palestinian demonstrators gathered at the mosque to protest against the plan and against France’s vote in favor of it

== Structure ==
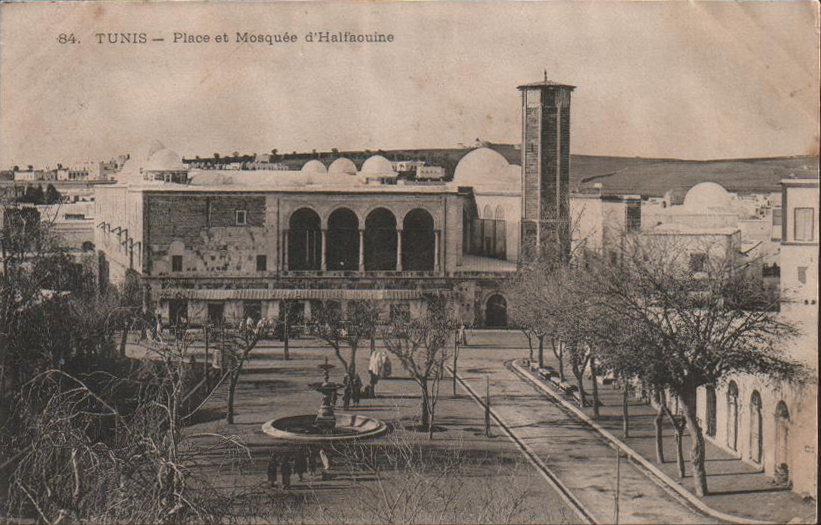
The mosque in 1900

It bears the name of the Grand Vizier Youssef Saheb Ettabaa and was opened in 1814. Its construction lasted six years, from 1808, led by Ben Sassi and a workforce consisting primarily of slaves captured by European pirates to Tunis and made available to the Minister by Hammouda Pacha. It is influenced by Italian architecture; columns with fluted shafts, capitals and especially a unique type of veneer marble polychrome.

The mosque dominates the imposing Halfaouine district with its many domes and colonnaded galleries Italian marble work. It is part of a monumental complex built at the same time including a bazaar, a hammam, two madrasas, a sabil or public fountain, a funduq and Ettabaâ Saheb's palace (now a public library) as well as his tomb. The combination of these schedules in place of worship is a unique example in the construction of religious buildings.

The minaret is octagonal, but remained unfinished until 1970, when restoration work was finished.

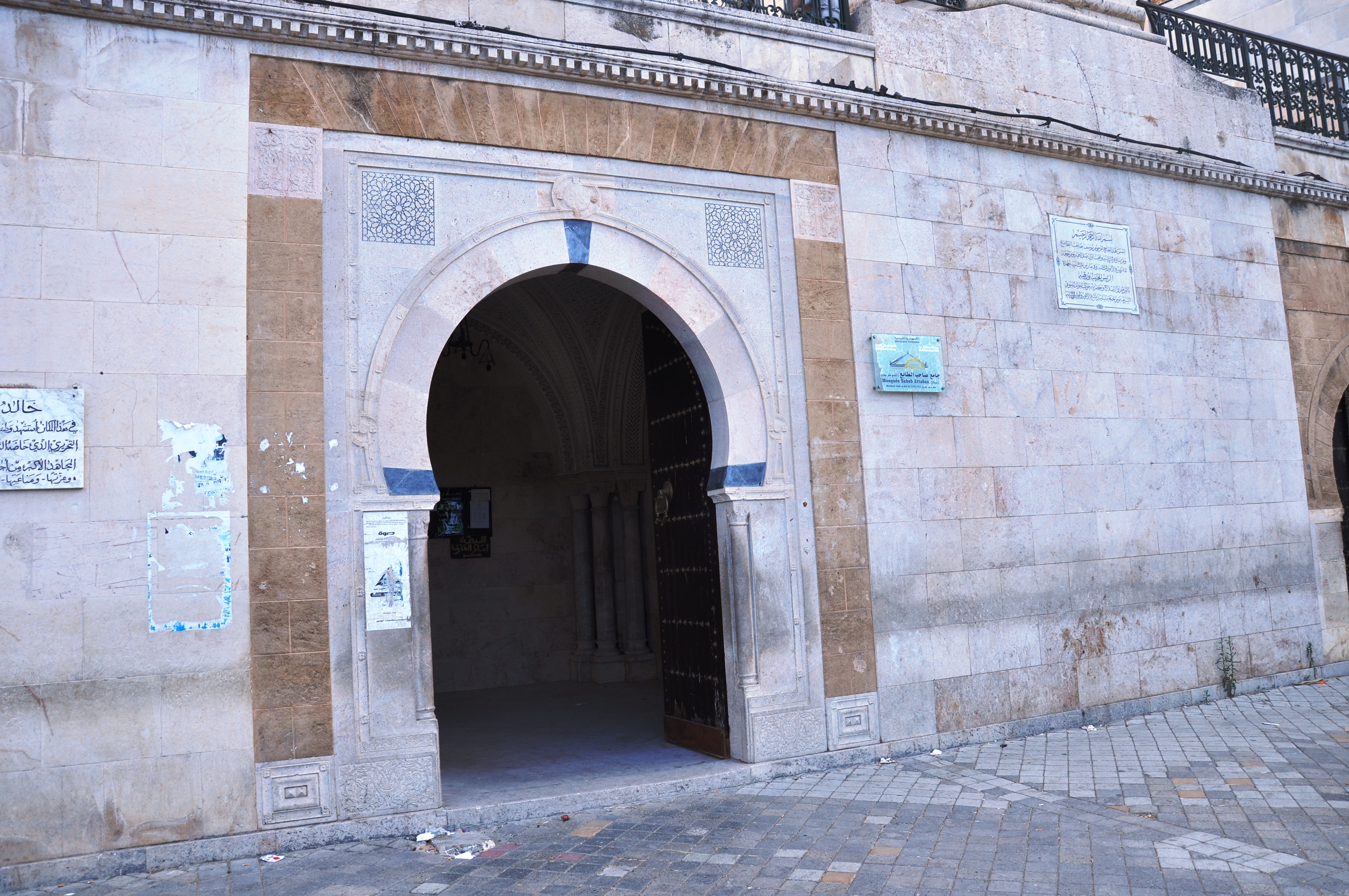
Entrance of the mosque

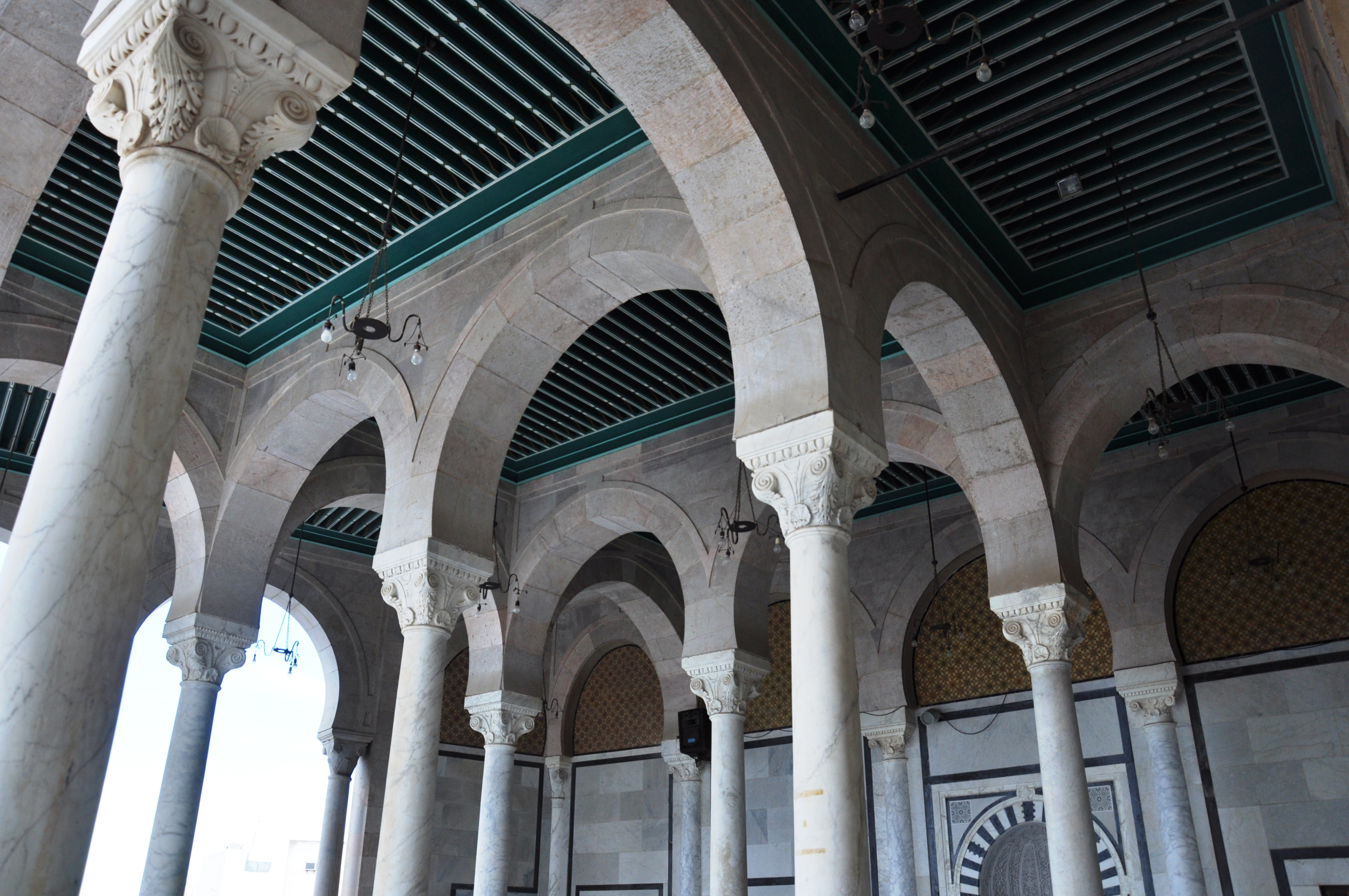
Arches of the main hall

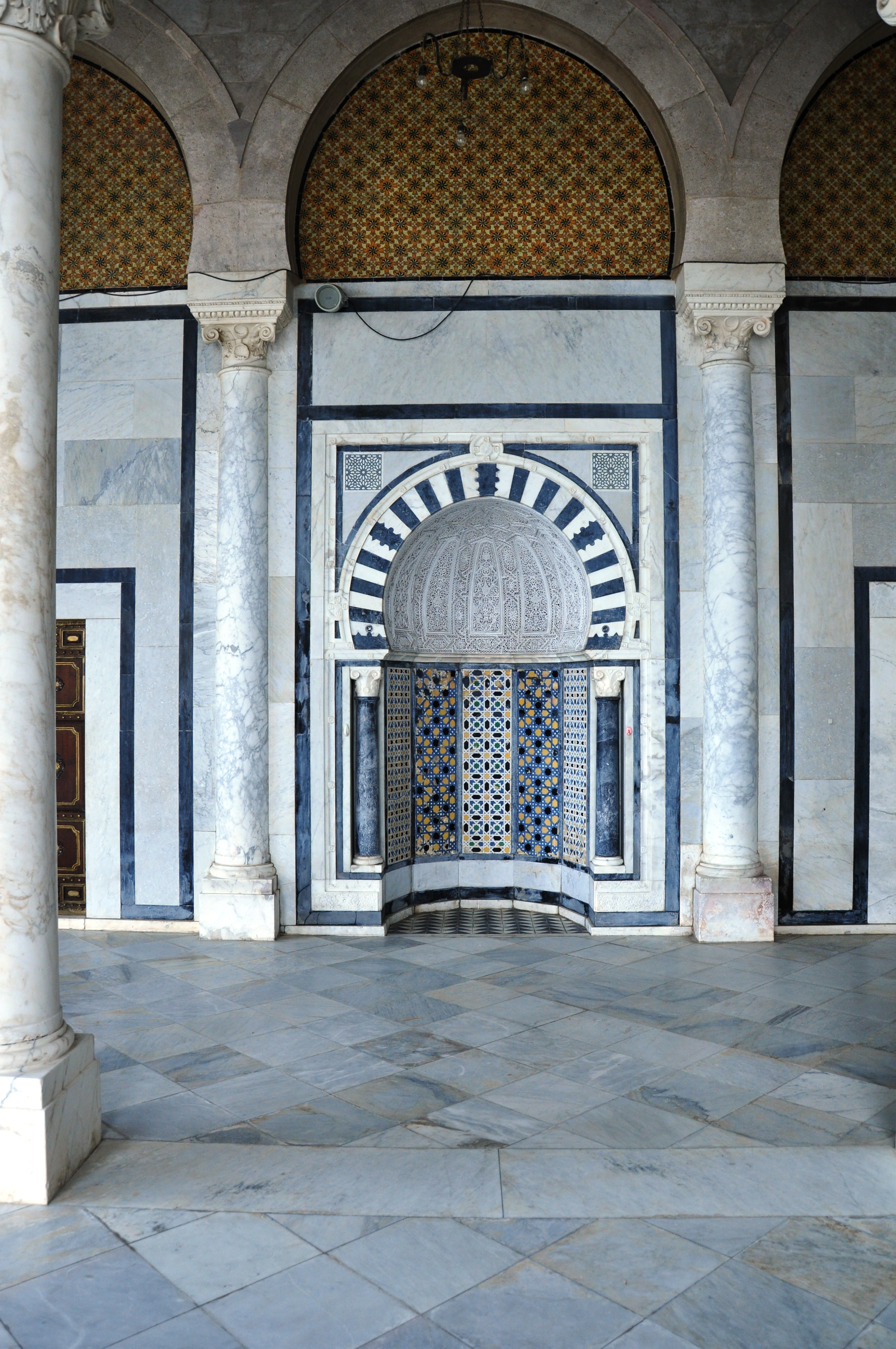
One of the hall porticos

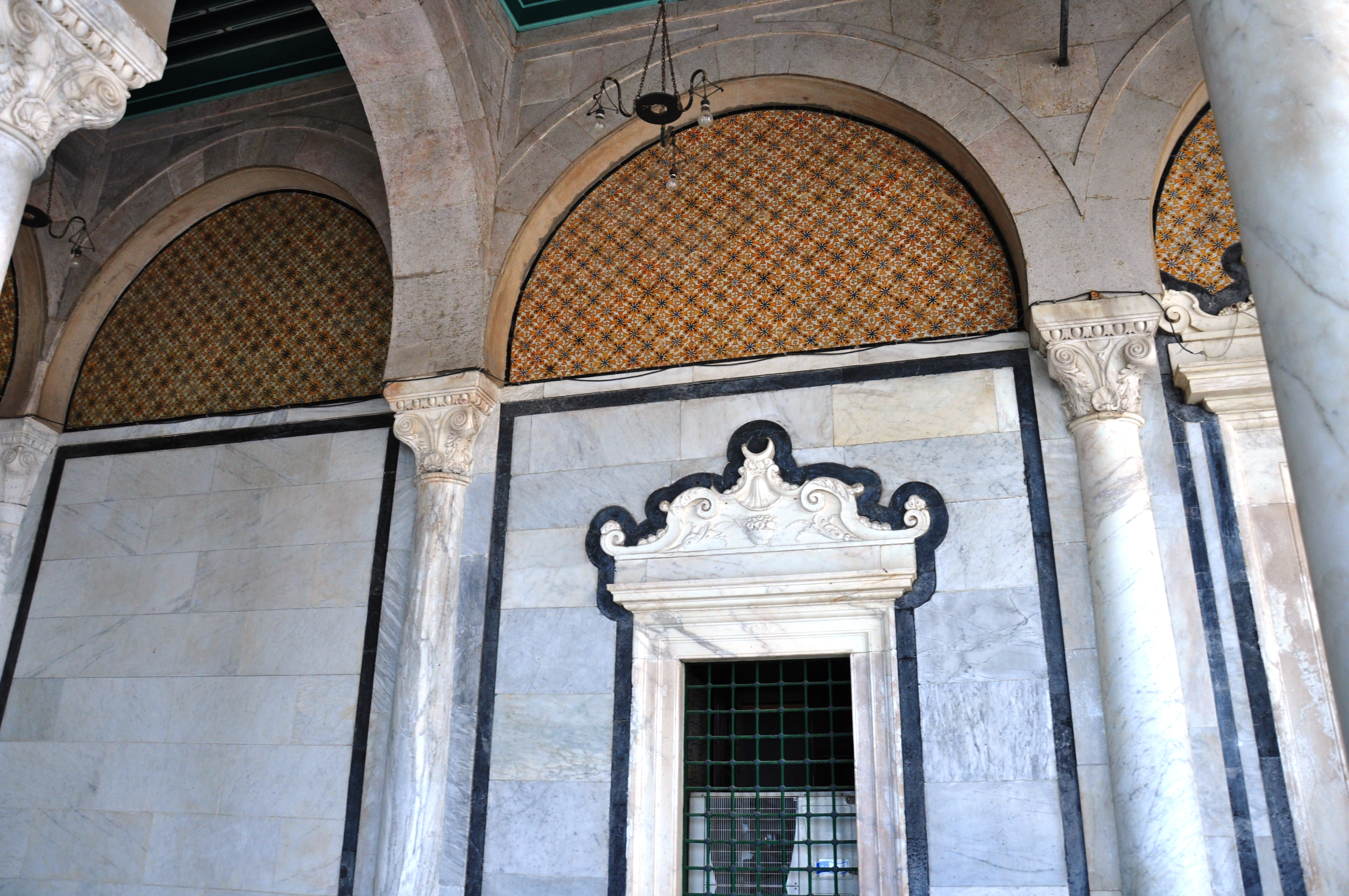
Decoration of the mosque

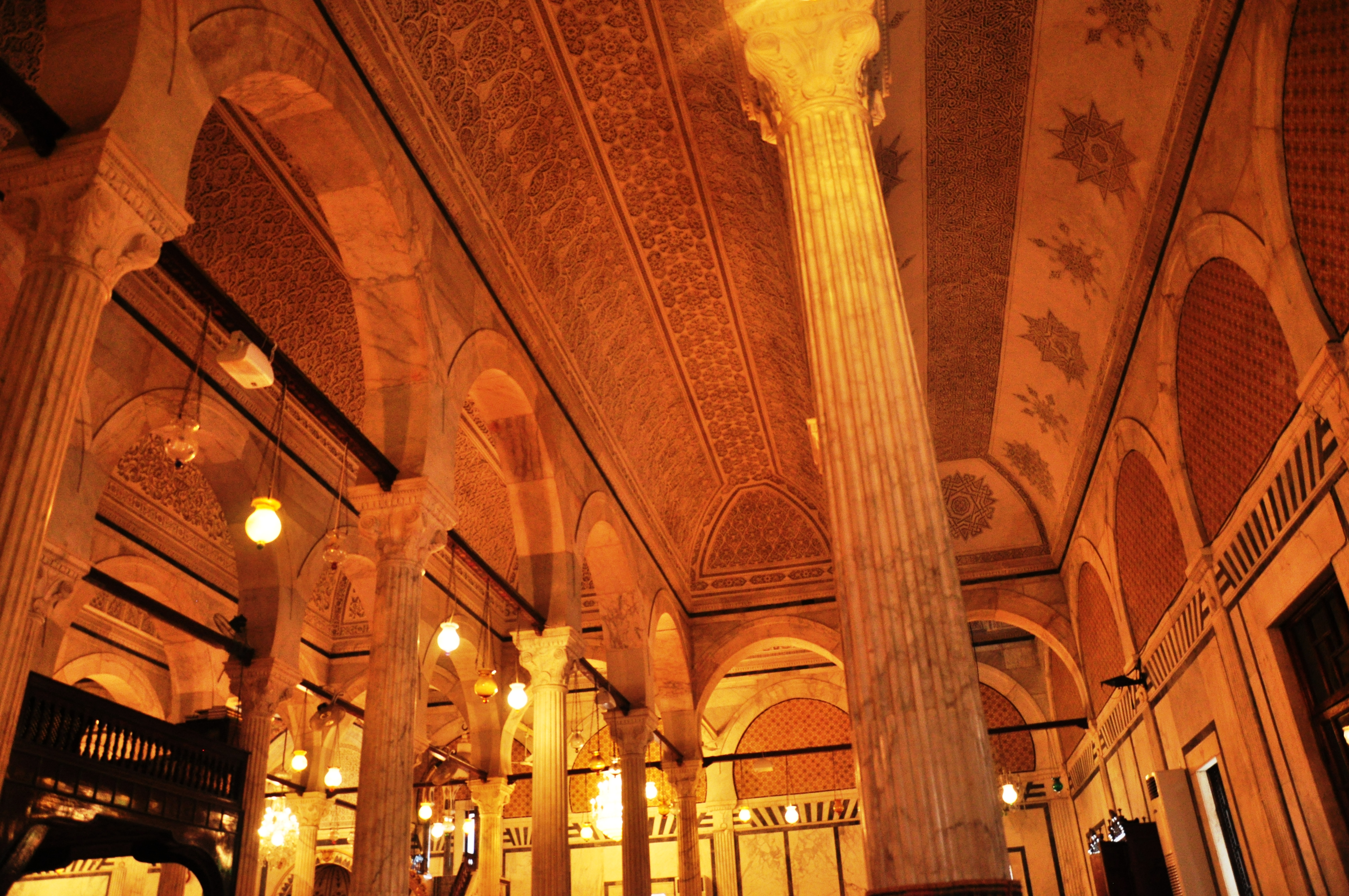
Prayer room

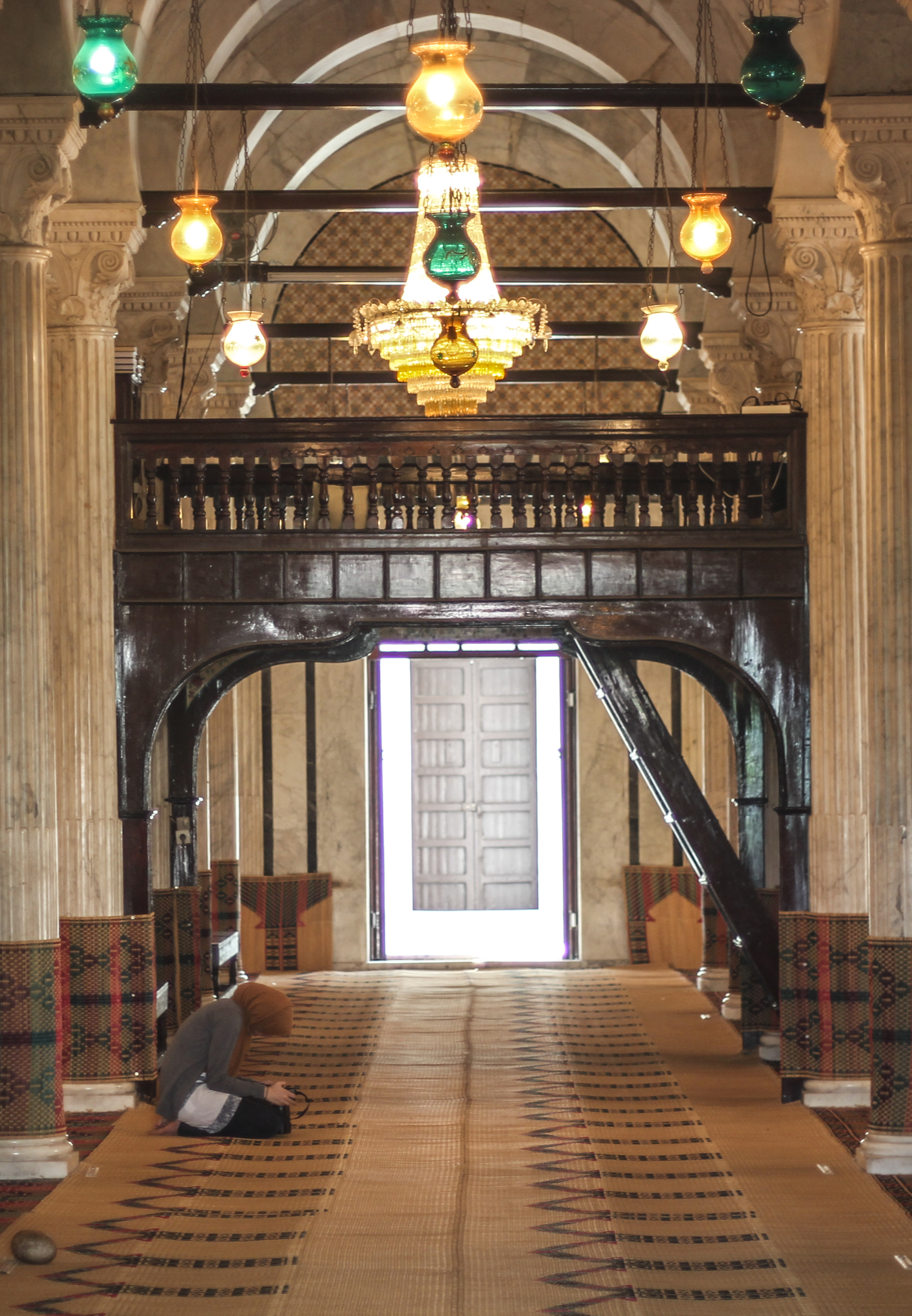
One of the prayer room's spans

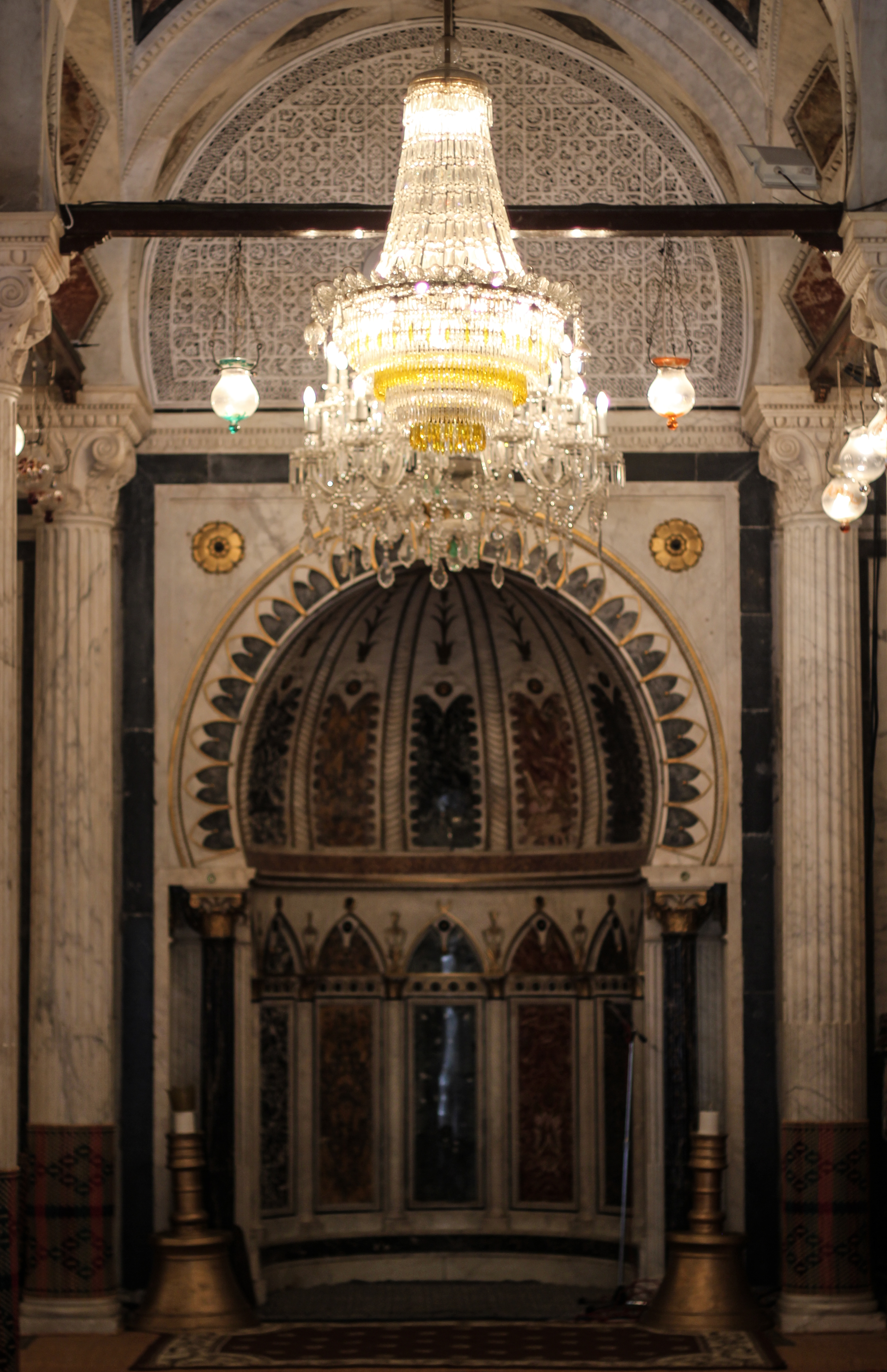
The mosque's Mihrab

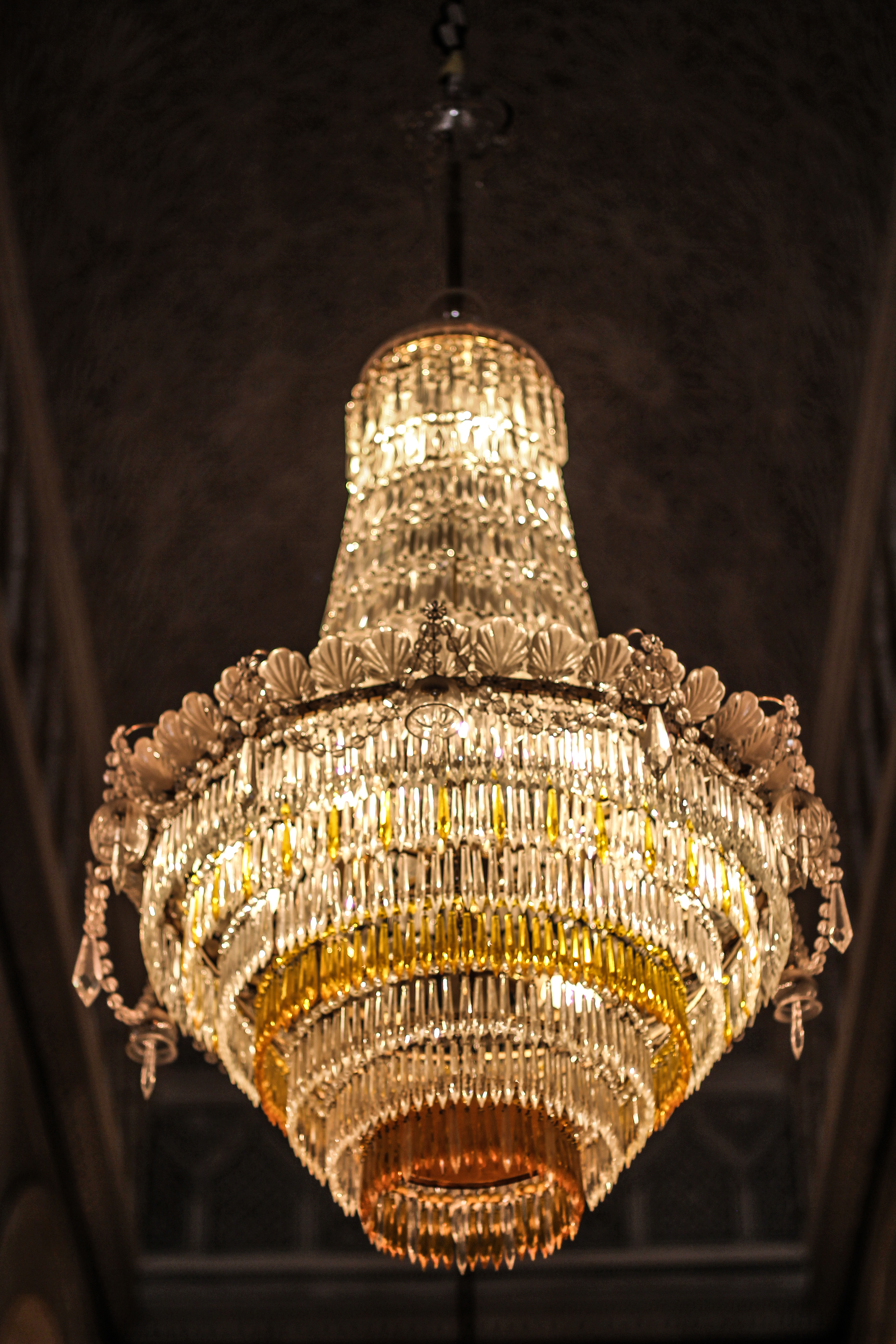
Chandelier of the prayer room

| Click on images to enlarge |
