= List of wars involving Morocco =

This is a list of wars involving the Kingdom of Morocco and the former entities that ruled the modern polity.

Moroccan victory
Moroccan defeat
Another result (e.g. a treaty or peace without a clear result, status quo ante bellum, result of civil or internal conflict, result unknown or indecisive)
Ongoing conflict

== Almoravid Empire (1040–1147) ==
Conflict	Combatant 1	Combatant 2	Results	Head of State	Moroccan losses
Battle of Tabfarilla (1056)	Almoravid dynasty	Godala Berbers	Victory: Almoravid vanguard is defeated but regrouped later.	Abu Bakr ibn Umar	Around 300 killed
Battle of Sagrajas (1086)	Almoravid dynasty (Andalusia) Taifa kingdoms	(Castile (historical region)) Kingdom of Castile (León, Spain) Kingdom of León	Victory: Decisive Christian defeat.	Yusuf ibn Tashfin	~3,000 killed
Battle of Aledo (1090)	Almoravid dynasty (Andalusia) Taifa kingdoms	(Castile (historical region)) Kingdom of Castile (León, Spain) Kingdom of Leon	Defeat: Castilian-Leonese victory.	Yusuf ibn Tashfin	Unknown
Battle of Consuegra (1097)	Almoravid dynasty	(Castile (historical region)) Kingdom of Castile (León, Spain) Kingdom of León	Victory: Castilian forces routed.	Yusuf ibn Tashfin	Hundreds killed
Battle of Uclés (1108)	Almoravid dynasty	(Castile (historical region)) Kingdom of Castile (León, Spain) Kingdom of Leon	Victory: Death of Infante Sancho Alfónsez.	Ali ibn Yusuf	Around 1,000–2,000 killed
Siege of Marrakesh (1147)	Almoravid dynasty	Almohad dynasty	Defeat: Almohad victory. * End of Almoravid rule.	Ishaq ibn Ali	Entire garrison & rulers executed

== Almohad Caliphate (1121–1269) ==
Conflict	Combatant 1	Combatant 2	Results	Head of State	Moroccan losses
Siege of Seville (1147)	Almohad dynasty	Almoravid dynasty	Victory: Seville captured by Almohads.	Abd al-Mu'min	Unknown
Siege of Mahdia (1160)	Almohad dynasty	Kingdom of Sicily *(Normans)*	Victory: Normans expelled from Mahdia.	Abd al-Mu'min	Unknown
Battle of Alarcos (1195)	Almohad dynasty	(Castile (historical region)) Kingdom of Castile	Victory: Complete route of Christian forces.	Abu Yaqub Yusuf	Around 4,000–5,000 killed
Battle of Las Navas de Tolosa (1212)	Almohad dynasty	(Castile (historical region)) Kingdom of Castile; Kingdom of Aragon; Kingdom of Navarre; Kingdom of Portugal	Defeat: Christian coalition victory.	Muhammad al-Nasir	~20,000 to 50,000 killed
Fall of Marrakesh (1269)	Almohad dynasty	Marinid Sultanate	Defeat: Marinid victory. * End of Almohad rule.	Idris al-Wathiq	Dynasty ended

== Marinid Sultanate (1244–1465) ==
Conflict	Combatant 1	Combatant 2	Results	Head of State	Moroccan losses
Battle of Salé (1260)	Marinid Sultanate	Kingdom of Castile	Victory: Castile is expelled from Salé.	Abu Yusuf Yaqub ibn Abd Al-Haqq	Several killed 3,000 captured and taken as slaves in Seville
Zayyanid Capture of Sijilmasa (1264)	Marinid Sultanate	Zayyanid Kingdom	Defeat: Zayyanid victory.	Abu Yusuf Yaqub ibn Abd Al-Haqq	
Battle of Écija (1275)	Marinid Sultanate; Emirate of Granada	Kingdom of Castile	Victory: Decapitation of Nuño González de Lara.	Abu Yusuf Yaqub ibn Abd Al-Haqq	Unknown
Battle of Martos (1275)	Marinid Sultanate; Emirate of Granada	Kingdom of Castile	Victory: Capture and murder of Sancho of Aragon.	Abu Yusuf Yaqub ibn Abd Al-Haqq	Unknown
Battle of Algeciras (1278)	Marinid Sultanate; Emirate of Granada	Kingdom of Castile; Order of Santa María de España	Victory: Destruction of the entire Castilian fleet.	Abu Yusuf Yaqub ibn Abd Al-Haqq	Unknown
Siege of Algeciras (1278–1279)	Marinid Sultanate	Kingdom of Castile	Victory: Destruction of the entire Castilian fleet.; Alfonso X of Castile signs a new truce in 1279.	Unknown	
Siege of Tlemcen (1299–1307)	Marinid Sultanate	Zayyanid Kingdom	Defeat: The Marinids abandons the siege.	Abu Yaqub Yusuf an-Nasr	Unknown
Third Siege of Gibraltar (Feb.–Jun. 1333)	Marinid Sultanate	Kingdom of Castile	Victory: Conquest of Gibraltar by the Marinids.	Abu al-Hasan Ali	Unknown
Fourth Siege of Gibraltar (Jun.–Aug. 1333)	Marinid Sultanate	Kingdom of Castile	Victory: The Marinids retain control of Gibraltar.; Castilian siege lifted.	Abu al-Hasan Ali	Unknown
Siege of Tlemcen (1335–1337)	Marinid Sultanate	Zayyanid Kingdom	Victory: The Marinids annexe the Kingdom of Tlemcen.	Abu al-Hasan Ali	Unknown
Battle of Vega de Pagana (1339)	Marinid Sultanate; Emirate of Granada	Crown of Castile	Defeat: Death of Abu Malik.	Abu al-Hasan Ali	Unknown
Battle of Río Salado (1340)	Marinid Sultanate; Emirate of Granada	Crown of Castile; Kingdom of Portugal	Defeat: The Marinid invasion decisively repelled.	Abu al-Hasan Ali	Unknown
Battle of Estepona (1342)	Marinid Sultanate	Crown of Aragon	Defeat: Rout of the Marinid fleet.	Abu al-Hasan Ali	4 galleys captured 2 ships destroyed
Siege of Algeciras (1342–1344)	Marinid Sultanate; Emirate of Granada	Crown of Castile; Republic of Genoa; Kingdom of Aragon; Kingdom of Portugal; Kingdom of Navarre; Crusaders	Defeat: Conquest of Algeciras by Castile.	Abu al-Hasan Ali	Unknown
Fifth Siege of Gibraltar (1349–1350)	Marinid Sultanate; Emirate of Granada	Kingdom of Castile	Victory: Castilian withdrawal.	Abu Inan Faris	Unknown
Sixth Siege of Gibraltar (1411)	Marinid Sultanate	Emirate of Granada	Defeat: Granada retains control of Gibraltar.	Abu Said Uthman III	Unknown
Conquest of Ceuta (1415)	Marinid Sultanate	Kingdom of Portugal	Defeat: Conquest of Ceuta by Portugal.	Abu Said Uthman III	Several thousands killed or taken prisoners 1 cannon captured
Siege of Ceuta (1419)	Marinid Sultanate; Emirate of Granada	Portuguese Empire	Defeat: Portugal retains control of Ceuta.	Abu Said Uthman III	Unknown
Battle of Tangier (1437)	Marinid Sultanate	Portuguese Empire	Victory: Marinid victory; Capture of Ferdinand the Holy Prince.	Abd al-Haqq II	Unknown

== Wattasid Sultanate (1472–1554) ==
Conflict	Combatant 1	Combatant 2	Results	Head of State	Moroccan losses
Conquest of Asilah (1471)	Wattasid Sultanate	Portuguese Empire	Defeat: Conquest of Asilah and Tangier by Portugal.	Muhammad ibn Yahya al-Sheikh	2,000 killed 5,000 captured
Conquest of Melilla (1497)	Wattasid Sultanate	Castile–Aragon Union	Defeat: Conquest of Melilla by Spain.	Muhammad ibn Yahya al-Sheikh	Unknown
Battle of Azemmour (1513)	Wattasid Sultanate	Portuguese Empire	Defeat: Conquest of Azemmour by Portugal.	Muhammad al-Burtuqali	1,500 infantry killed 1000 cavalry killed 7 ships destroyed
Battle of Mamora (1515)	Wattasid Sultanate	Portuguese Empire	Victory: Portugal abandons its fort in Mamora (Mehdya).	Muhammad al-Burtuqali	Unknown

== Saadi Sultanate (1510–1659) ==
Conflict	Combatant 1	Combatant 2	Results	Head of State	Moroccan losses
Fall of Agadir (1541)	Saadi Sultanate	Portuguese Empire	Victory: Morocco annexes Agadir.; Portugal evacuates Azemmour and Safi.	Mohammed al-Shaykh	Unknown
Campaign of Tlemcen (1551)	Saadi Sultanate; Spanish Empire	Ottoman Empire: Beylerbeylik of Algiers; Kingdom of Aït AbbasZayyanid Kingdom	Defeat: Algiers captures Tlemcen.; The Moulouya River is imposed as the border.	Mohammed al-Shaykh	Unknown
Battle of Taza (1553)	Saadi Sultanate	Regency of Algiers	Defeat: Algerian captured and garrisoned Taza	Mohammed al-Shaykh	
Capture of Fez (1554)	Saadi Sultanate	Ottoman Empire: Beylerbeylik of Algiers; Kingdom of Kuku; Wattasid Sultanate; Principality of Debdou	Defeat: The Ottomans occupy Fez for four months.; Ali Abu Hassun rules Fez as an Ottoman vassal.	Mohammed al-Shaykh	Unknown
Battle of Tadla (1554)	Saadi Sultanate	Wattasid Sultanate	Victory: The Saadi dynasty becomes the undisputed ruler of Morocco.; Death of Ali Abu Hassun and end of the Wattasid dynasty.; Fez is no longer an Ottoman vassal.	Mohammed al-Shaykh	Unknown
Campaign of Tlemcen (1557)	Saadi Sultanate	Beylerbeylik of Algiers; Kingdom of Aït Abbas	Defeat: Assassination of Mohammed al-Shaykh under the commands of Hasan Pasha.	Mohammed al-Shaykh	Unknown
Battle of Wadi al-Laban (1558)	Saadi Sultanate	Beylerbeylik of Algiers	Inconclusive	Abdallah al-Ghalib	Unknown
Siege of Mazagan (1562)	Saadi Sultanate	Portuguese Empire	Defeat: Portugal retains control of Mazagan (El Jadida).	Abdallah al-Ghalib	Unknown
Rebellion of the Alpujarras (1568–1571)	Muslims of Granada; Support: Saadi Sultanate; Beylerbeylik of Algiers	Spanish Empire	Defeat: Mass expulsion of most Muslims in Granada.; Resettlement of Granada with Catholic settlers.	Abdallah al-Ghalib	Unknown
Capture of Fez (1576)	Saadi Sultanate: Muhammad Abu Abdallah Forces	Saadi Sultanate: Abd al-Malik Forces; Ottoman Empire: Beylerbeylik of Algiers	Abd al-Malik Forces Victory: Ottoman Forces conquer Fez then Marrakesh.; Abd al-Malik assumes rule over Morocco as an Ottoman vassal.	Abdallah Mohammed	Unknown
Battle of Alcácer Quibir (1578)	Saadi Sultanate	Portuguese Empire	Victory: Death of Abd al-Malik, Abdallah Mohammed and Sebastian of Portugal.; 1580 Portuguese succession crisis.	Abd al-Malik I	7,000 dead (Portuguese source) 1,500 dead (Spanish source)
Battle of Tondibi (1591)	Saadi Sultanate	Songhai Empire	Victory: Collapse of the Songhai Empire.; Formation of the Pashalik of Timbuktu.	Ahmad al-Mansur	Unknown
Battle of Jenné (1599)	Saadi Sultanate: Timbuktu	Mali Empire	Victory: Collapse of the Mali Empire.	Ahmad al-Mansur	Unknown
Succession War (1603–1627)	Saadi Sultanate: Marrakesh Forces	Saadi Sultanate: Fez Forces	Marrakesh Forces Victory: Morocco is reunified under the rule of Abd al-Malik II.	Abd al-Malik II	Unknown

== Alaouite Sultanate (1668–1912) ==
Conflict	Combatant 1	Combatant 2	Results	Head of State	Moroccan losses
Siege of Tangier (1680)	Alaouite Sultanate	Kingdom of England: Tangier	Defeat	Ismail Ibn Sharif	
Siege of Mehdya (1681)	Alaouite Sultanate	Spanish Empire	Victory: Morocco recaptures Mehdya.	Ismail Ibn Sharif	Unknown
Siege of Larache (1689)	Alaouite Sultanate	Spanish Empire	Victory: Morocco annexes Larache.	Ismail Ibn Sharif	Unknown
Siege of Asilah (1691)	Alaouite Sultanate	Spanish Empire	Victory: Morocco annexes Asilah.	Ismail Ibn Sharif	Unknown
Battle of Moulouya (1692)	Alaouite Sultanate	Deylik of Algiers	Defeat: The Moulouya River is imposed as the border.	Ismail Ibn Sharif	5,000 killed
Siege of Oran (1693)	Alaouite Sultanate	Spanish Empire; Deylik of Algiers	Defeat: Rout of the Moroccan troops.	Ismail Ibn Sharif	Unknown
Sieges of Ceuta (1694–1727)	Alaouite Sultanate; Support: Kingdom of England (Until 1707); Great Britain (From 1707)	Spanish Empire	Withdrawal: Moroccan retreat following the death of Moulay Ismail.; Spain retains control of Ceuta.	Ismail Ibn Sharif	Unknown
Maghrebi War (1699–1702)	Beylik of Tunis; Alaouite Sultanate; Pashalik of Tripoli (Until 1700)	Deylik of Algiers; Pashalik of Tripoli (From 1700)	Stalemate: Algiers' ambitions halted; Morocco fails to expand.; Fall of the Muradid dynasty in Tunis.; Civil war in Tripoli.	Ismail Ibn Sharif	3,050 killed (Battle of Chelif)
Laghouat Expedition (1708–1713)	Alaouite Sultanate	Laghouat; Aïn Madhi; Aïn Séfra; Boussemghoun	Victory: The oases around Laghouat become tributaries of Morocco.	Ismail Ibn Sharif	Unknown
Larache Expedition (1765)	Alaouite Sultanate	Kingdom of France	Victory: Rout of the French fleet.; Signing of a truce and a treaty in 1767.	Mohammed III	30 killed
Siege of Mazagan (1769)	Alaouite Sultanate	Kingdom of Portugal	Victory: Morocco recaptures Mazagan.	Mohammed III	Unknown
Siege of Melilla (1774–1775)	Alaouite Sultanate; Support: Great Britain	Kingdom of Spain	Defeat: Treaty of Aranjuez.; Morocco recognises Spanish rule of Melilla.; Spain cedes territories to Morocco.	Mohammed III	600 dead or wounded
Dutch-Moroccan War (1775–1777)	Alaouite Sultanate	Dutch Republic	Defeat: Release of all Dutch slaves.; Freeing of the Dutch Republic from paying tributes and sending gifts to Morocco.	Mohammed III	Several ships destroyed and captured
Capture of the Rif (1792)	Alaouite Sultanate	Deylik of Algiers	Defeat: Conquest of the eastern Rif region by Algiers.	Slimane ben Mohammed	Unknown
First Barbary War (1802–1804)	Pashalik of Tripoli; Alaouite Sultanate	United States; Sweden (1802); Sicily	Inconclusive: Peace treaty.	Slimane ben Mohammed	None
Campaign of Azrou and Sefrou (1811-1812)	Alaouite Sultanate	Zayanes	Defeat	Slimane ben Mohammed	Unknown
Battle of Zayan (1818)	Alaouite Sultanate	Berber coalition	Defeat	Unknown	
French conquest of Algeria (1830–1844)	Deylik of Algiers; Emirate of Mascara; Support: Alaouite Sultanate	France: French Algeria	Defeat: France pacifies resistance forces.; Franco-Moroccan War.	Abd al-Rahman ben Hisham	Unknown
Franco-Moroccan War (1844)	Alaouite Sultanate	France: French Algeria	Defeat: Treaty of Tangier.; Morocco recognises Algeria as part of the French Empire.; Treaty of Lalla Maghnia.; France annexes El Bayadh, Chellala, Boussemghoun and Tiout.	Abd al-Rahman ben Hisham	870 killed 28 cannons lost
Bombardment of Salé (1851)	Alaouite Sultanate	France	Inconclusive: Moroccan political victory.; French military victory.	Abd al-Rahman ben Hisham	24 killed 47 injured
Battle of Tres Forcas (1856)	Alaouite Sultanate	Prussia	Victory: Prussian withdrawal.; Adalbert of Prussia and Eduard von Knorr wounded.	Abd al-Rahman ben Hisham	Unknown
Hispano-Moroccan War (1859–1860)	Alaouite Sultanate	Spain	Defeat: Treaty of Wad Ras.; Morocco recognises Spanish rule of Ceuta and Melilla.; Retrocession of Santa Cruz de la Mar Pequeña.; Morocco pays war reparations of 20 million duros.	Mohammed IV	6,000 killed
Tarfaya Expedition (1886–1888)	Alaouite Sultanate	United Kingdom: British North West Africa	Victory: Treaty of Cape Juby.; Retrocession of Tarfaya in 1895.	Hassan I	Unknown
Margallo War (1893–1894)	Alaouite Sultanate	Spain	Defeat: Treaty of Fez.; Melilla hinterlands ceded to Spain.; Morocco pays war reparations of 20 million pesetas and pledges to pacify northern provinces.	Hassan I	Unknown
Bou Hmara Rebellion (1902–1909)	Alaouite Sultanate	Bou Hmara's Domains	Victory: Execution of Bou Hmara.	Abd al-Aziz ben Hassan	Unknown
Al-Raysuni Rebellion (1903–1908)	Alaouite Sultanate	Al-Raysuni's Domains	Compromise: Pacification of al-Raysuni after appointment as Pasha of Tangier.	Abd al-Aziz ben Hassan	Unknown
Pacification of Mauritania (1904–1908)	Emirate of Adar; Support: Alaouite Sultanate	France: French Mauritania	Defeat: Assassination of Xavier Coppolani.; Conquest of Adrar by France.	Abd al-Aziz ben Hassan	Unknown
French conquest of Morocco (1907–1912)	Alaouite Sultanate	France: French Algeria; Spain	Defeat: Treaty of Fes.; Morocco becomes a French protectorate.	Abd al-Aziz ben Hassan	Unknown

== Kingdom of Morocco (1956–present) ==
Conflict	Combatant 1	Combatant 2	Results	Head of State	Moroccan losses
Ifni War (1957–1958)	Morocco	Spain: Spanish West Africa; France: French Mauritania	Victory: No longer tied down in conflicts with the French, committed a significant portion of its resources and manpower to gain independence from Spain.; Treaty of Angra de Cintra	Mohammed V	1,000 killed
Rif Revolt (1958–1959)	Morocco	Riffian insurgents	Victory: Rebellion suppressed	Mohammed V	~1,000 killed
Angolan War of Independence (1961–1974)	FNLA; UNITA; Support: Morocco; Bulgaria; China; North Korea; Romania; Tunisia; United States; Zaire; Zambia	Portugal: Portuguese Angola; Support: Rhodesia; South Africa	Victory: Independence of Angola; Carnation Revolution in Portugal	Hassan II	Unknown
Tuareg Rebellion (1962–1964)	Mali; Support: Morocco; Algeria	Tuareg insurgents	Victory: Rebellion suppressed	Hassan II	Unknown
Sand War (1963)	Morocco; Support: France	Algeria; Support: Cuba; United Arab Republic	Stalemate: The closing of the border south of Figuig; Demilitarized zone established	Hassan II	39 killed, 57 captured or 200 killed
October War (1973)	Egypt; Syria; Expeditionary forces Saudi Arabia Algeria Jordan Libya Iraq Kuwait Tunisia Morocco Cuba North Korea	Israel	Defeat (Strategic Political Gains): At the final ceasefire: Egyptian forces held 1,200 km^{2} (460 sq mi) on the eastern bank of the canal.; Israeli forces held 1,600 km^{2} (620 sq mi) on the western bank of the canal.; Israeli forces held 500 km^{2} (193 sq mi) of the Syrian Bashan region of the Golan Heights.	Hassan II	6 captured
Green March (1975)	Morocco	Spain: Spanish Sahara	Victory: Madrid Accords; Spain leaves the territory	Hassan II	Unknown
Western Sahara War (1975–1991)	Morocco; Mauritania (Until 1979); France (Opération Lamantin, aid from 1978); Support: Saudi Arabia; United States	Sahrawi Arab Democratic Republic: Polisario Front; Algeria (Amgala I, aid from 1976); Support: Libya (Until 1984)	Stalemate: Spanish withdrawal under the Madrid Accords (1976); Mauritanian retreat and withdrawal of territorial claims; Military Stalemate; Ceasefire agreed on between the Polisario Front and Morocco (1991); Morocco controls 75% of the Western Sahara, the Polisario Front controls 25%	Hassan II	Unknown 2,155– 2,300 captured
Shaba I (1977)	Zaire; Morocco; Belgium; Egypt; France	FNLC	Victory: FNLC expelled from Katanga; The FNLC withdrew to Angola and possibly to Zambia	Hassan II	8 killed
Shaba II (1978)	Zaire; Morocco; Belgium; France; United States	FNLC	Victory: Non-aggression pact of 1979; mutual end of support for other nations' rebel groups	Hassan II	1 paratrooper killed
Gulf War (1990–1991)	United States; United Kingdom; Egypt; France; Kuwait; Saudi Arabia; Morocco; Australia; Bahrain; Bangladesh; Belgium; Canada; Czechoslovakia; Denmark Italy; Netherlands; New Zealand; Oman; Pakistan; Poland; Portugal; Qatar; Senegal; South Korea; Spain; Syria; United Arab Emirates: other allies	Iraq	Victory: Iraqi withdrawal from Kuwait; Emir Jaber Al-Ahmad Al-Jaber Al-Sabah restored; Kuwaiti independence restored; Heavy casualties and destruction of Iraqi and Kuwaiti infrastructure	Hassan II	Unknown
Operation Restore Hope (1992–1993)	UNITAF: Morocco; Australia; Bangladesh; Belgium; Botswana; Canada; Egypt; Ethiopia; France; Germany; Greece; India; Italy; Kuwait; Malaysia; New Zealand; Nigeria; Norway; Pakistan; Saudi Arabia; Spain; Tunisia; Turkey; United Arab Emirates; United Kingdom; United States; Zimbabwe	Somali National Alliance	Victory	Hassan II	None
Perejil Island crisis (2002)	Morocco	Spain	Defeat: Status quo ante bellum	Mohammed VI	6 soldiers captured and released on the same day
Insurgency in the Maghreb (2002–)	Morocco; Algeria; Libya; Mali; Mauritania; Niger; Tunisia; Support: Czech Republic; Denmark; France; Germany; Netherlands; Russia; Sweden; United Kingdom; United States	Al-Qaeda Da'ish	Ongoing: Islamists capture Northern Mali; Islamists capture territory in Libya as a result of the Libyan Civil War	Mohammed VI	Unknown
Operation Scorched Earth (2009–2010)	Yemen; Saudi Arabia; Morocco; Jordan	Houthis; Iran	Stalemate: Houthis consolidate control over Sa'dah; Ceasefire after rebels accepted the government's truce conditions.	Mohammed VI	None
Central African Republic Civil War (2013–)	Central African Republic; Morocco; MICOPAX: Angola; Burundi; Cameroon; Chad; DR Congo; Congo Republic; Equatorial Guinea; Gabon; Rwanda; São Tomé and Príncipe; Uganda; MINUSCA (From 2014); Russia (From 2018); France (Until 2021); South Africa (2013); MISCA (Until 2014); EUFOR RCA: (2014–2015): Estonia; Finland; Georgia; Italy; Latvia; Luxembourg; Netherlands; Poland; Portugal; Romania; Spain	CPC; PRNC; LRA	Ongoing: As of July 2021 government controls more territory than at any point since the war began in 2012	Mohammed VI	None
Intervention In Iraq (2014–2016)	CJTF–OIR: United States; Morocco; Australia; Belgium; Canada; Denmark; France; Germany; Italy; Jordan; Netherlands; New Zealand; Turkey; United Kingdom Iraq	Da'ish; White Flags	Victory: Iraqi government forces regain control of all parts of Iraq previously controlled by ISIL.; Heavy damage dealt to ISIL forces; military defeat in Iraq; Iraq declares military victory against ISIL on 9 December 2017	Mohammed VI	Unknown
Intervention in Syria (2014–2016)	CJTF–OIR: United States; Morocco; Australia; Bahrain; Belgium; Canada; Denmark; France; Germany (From 2015); Italy; Jordan; Netherlands; Qatar; Saudi Arabia; United Arab Emirates; United Kingdom	Da'ish Al-Qaeda; Turkistan Islamic Party Syria; Russia; Iran	Victory: ISIL had lost 25 percent of the territory it possessed in Syria.	Mohammed VI	Unknown
Intervention In Yemen (2015–2019)	Saudi Arabia; United Arab Emirates; Morocco; Bahrain; Egypt; Jordan; Kuwait; Qatar (Until 2017); Senegal; Sudan; Support: Germany; United Kingdom (Until 2017); United States	Supreme Revolutionary Committee–Supreme Political Council; Houthis; Iran; North Korea	Stalemate: Military stalemate in 2019.; Morocco ended their participation in 2019 due to deterioration of Morocco–Saudi Arabia relations	Mohammed VI	10 killed 1 F-16 shot down
Western Saharan clashes (2020–)	Morocco	Sahrawi Arab Democratic Republic: Polisario Front	Ongoing: Morocco secured the Guerguerat border crossing.	Mohammed VI	At least 2 soldiers killed
