= 1533 =

1533 in various calendars
- Gregorian calendar: 1533; MDXXXIII
- Ab urbe condita: 2286
- Armenian calendar: 982; ԹՎ ՋՁԲ
- Assyrian calendar: 6283
- Balinese saka calendar: 1454–1455
- Bengali calendar: 939–940
- Berber calendar: 2483
- English Regnal year: 24 Hen. 8 – 25 Hen. 8
- Buddhist calendar: 2077
- Burmese calendar: 895
- Byzantine calendar: 7041–7042
- Chinese calendar: 壬辰年 (Water Dragon); 4230 or 4023 — to — 癸巳年 (Water Snake); 4231 or 4024
- Coptic calendar: 1249–1250
- Discordian calendar: 2699
- Ethiopian calendar: 1525–1526
- Hebrew calendar: 5293–5294
- Hindu calendars
- Vikram Samvat: 1589–1590
- Shaka Samvat: 1454–1455
- Kali Yuga: 4633–4634
- Holocene calendar: 11533
- Igbo calendar: 533–534
- Iranian calendar: 911–912
- Islamic calendar: 939–940
- Japanese calendar: Tenbun 2 (天文２年)
- Javanese calendar: 1451–1452
- Julian calendar: 1533; MDXXXIII
- Korean calendar: 3866
- Minguo calendar: 379 before ROC 民前379年
- Nanakshahi calendar: 65
- Thai solar calendar: 2075–2076
- Tibetan calendar: ཆུ་ཕོ་འབྲུག་ལོ་ (male Water-Dragon); 1659 or 1278 or 506 — to — ཆུ་མོ་སྦྲུལ་ལོ་ (female Water-Snake); 1660 or 1279 or 507

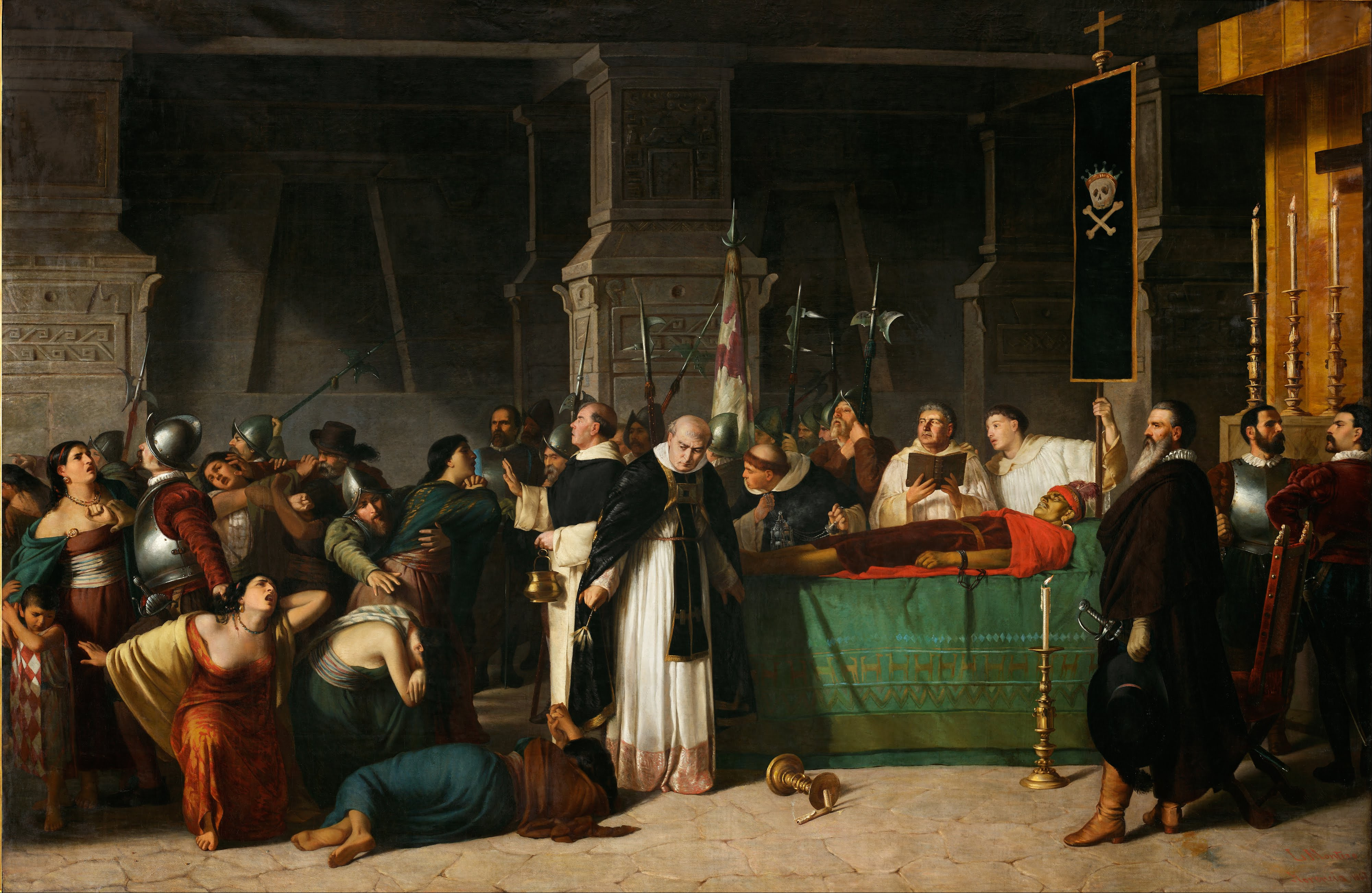
July 26: The Execution of the Inca Emperor Atahualpa takes place in Peru

1533 (MDXXXIII) is a common year starting on Wednesday of the Julian calendar, the 1,533rd year of the Common Era and Anno Domini designations, the 533rd year of the 2nd millennium, the 33rd year of the 16th century and the 3rd year of the 1530s.

== Events ==
=== January–March ===
- January 25 – King Henry VIII of England formally but secretly marries Anne Boleyn, who becomes his second queen consort.
- January 26 – Thomas Audley, 1st Baron Audley of Walden, is appointed Lord Chancellor of England.
- February 4 – The Reformation Parliament is summoned into session by King Henry VIII of England, and meets until April 7.
- February 8 – (15th waxing of Tabaung 894 ME) King Min Bin of Burma begins receiving tributes from the local lords of Bengal.
- February 14 – By a treaty between the German city of Münster and the Holy Roman Empire, Münster is recognized as a Lutheran city.
- February 18 – The order of the Clerics Regular of Saint Paul, more commonly called the Barnabites, is given papal approval by Pope Clement VII in the brief Vota per quae vos.
- March 30 – Thomas Cranmer becomes Archbishop of Canterbury.

=== April–June ===
- April 7 – The Statute in Restraint of Appeals in England, declaring the king to be the supreme sovereign and forbidding judicial appeals to the papacy, is given royal assent.
- April 10 – King Frederick I of Denmark, ruler of the Danes since 1523 and later elected, but never crowned, King of Norway, dies at the age of 61. The vacancy leaves a dispute over his successor, which soon becomes the Count's Feud (Grevens Fejde) between the Roman Catholic supporters of the former King Christian II of Denmark, and the Lutheran supporters of Frederick's son, proclaimed to be King Christian III.
- May 23 – King Henry VIII of England's marriage with Catherine of Aragon is declared annulled by Archbishop Cranmer. Since Pope Clement VII had rejected Henry's petition for annulment in 1530, Catherine continues to believe herself Henry's wife until her death.
- June 1
  - Cartagena, Colombia, is founded by Pedro de Heredia.
  - Cranmer crowns Anne Boleyn as queen consort of England, in Westminster Abbey.

=== July–September ===
- July 11 – Henry VIII is excommunicated by Pope Clement VII, as is Archbishop Cranmer.
- July 22 – Treaty of Constantinople between the Ottoman Empire and the Archduchy of Austria: Ferdinand I, King of the Romans, withdraws his claims to most of Hungary and János Szapolyai, voivode of Transylvania, becomes King of Hungary under the suzerainty of Suleiman the Magnificent, Sultan of the Ottoman Empire.
- July 26 – Sapa Inca Atahualpa is executed by garotte, at the orders of Francisco Pizarro in Cajamarca. While older sources stated the execution had been on August 29, 1533, it would later be determined by late 20th century historians that the August date was incorrect because the Spaniards had departed Cajamarca by August 10. The Spanish arrange for his younger brother Túpac Huallpa to be crowned as a successor, but he dies in October after an apparent poisoning.
- August 13 – King François of France dispatches Colonel Pierre de Piton to Morocco with a letter addressed to the ruler, Sultan Abu al-Abbas Ahmad ibn Muhammad, in order to establish a trade agreement.
- September 7 – Anne Boleyn, the second wife of King Henry VIII of England gives birth to a daughter, at Greenwich, a little more than three months after she and Henry were married. The King's second daughter, Elizabeth, will become the reigning monarch of England 25 years later and rule for more than 44 years.
- September 13 – Antonio Sedeño, the Spanish Colonial Governor of Trinidad, comes under attack along with his troops by the Kalinago people, indigenous to the area. Though the Spanish lose many troops, Sedeño defeats the Kalinago and puts the island under Spanish rule.

=== October–December ===
- October 28 – The 14-year olds Henry, Duke of Orléans – the future King Henry II of France – and Catherine de' Medici are married at the Église Saint-Ferréol les Augustins in Marseille.
- November 15 – Francisco Pizarro arrives in Cusco, Peru.
- December 3 – Ivan IV succeeds his father Vasili III as Grand Prince of Muscovy at the age of three; he will rule in Russia until his death in 1584.
- December 21 (Feast of St Thomas the Apostle) – Hernando de Grijalva and his crew become the first persons discover the uninhabited Revillagigedo Islands, off the Pacific coast of Mexico, reporting the finding of what Grijalva names Isla Santo Tomé, probably Socorro Island.
- December 28 – Grijalva and his crew discover Isla de los Inocentes, probably San Benedicto Island.

=== Date unknown ===
- Pechenga Monastery is founded, in the far north of the Grand Duchy of Moscow.
- 1533–1534 – Sultan Suleiman the Magnificent makes the Ruthenian harem girl Roxelana his legal wife.

== Births ==
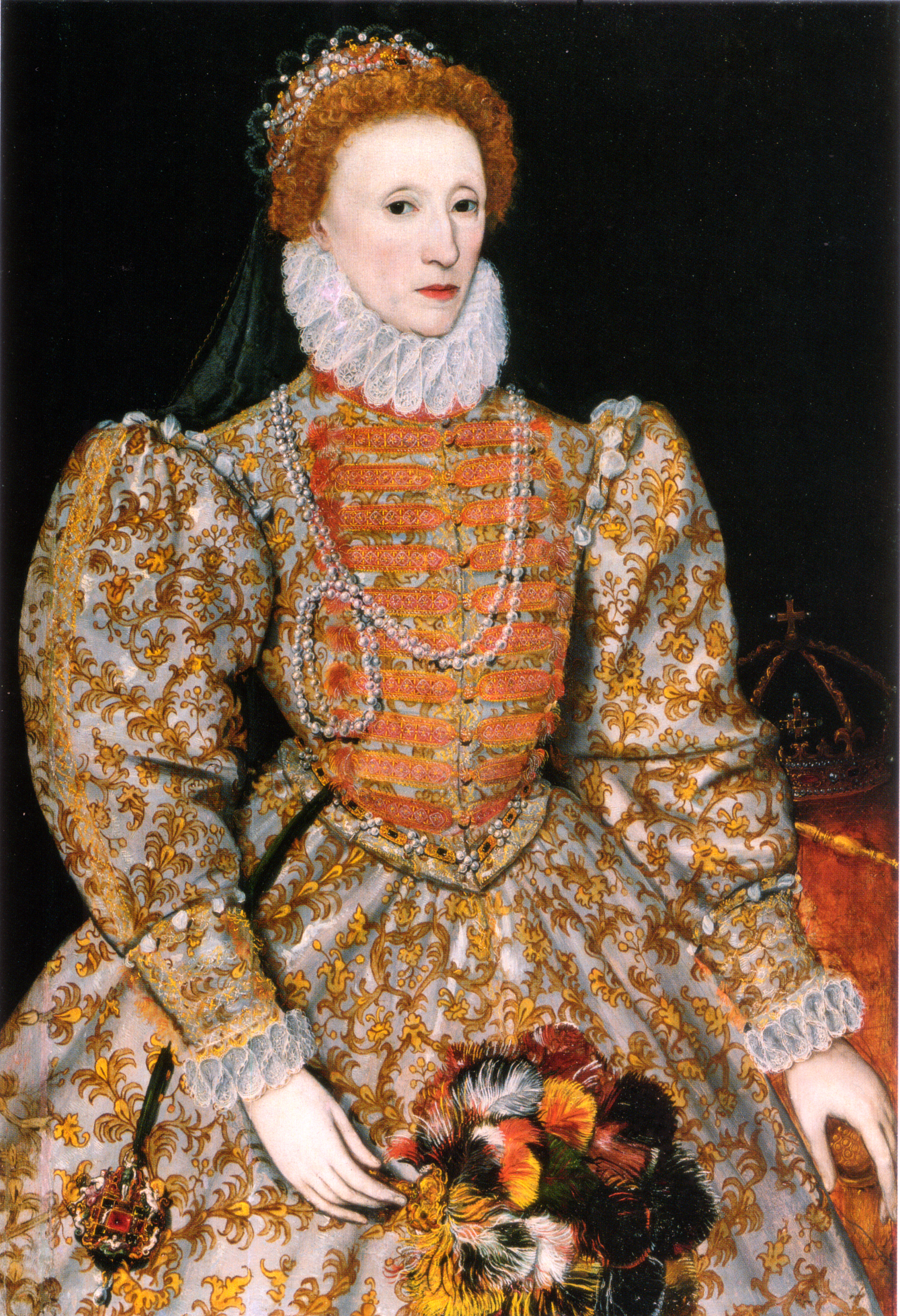
Queen Elizabeth I

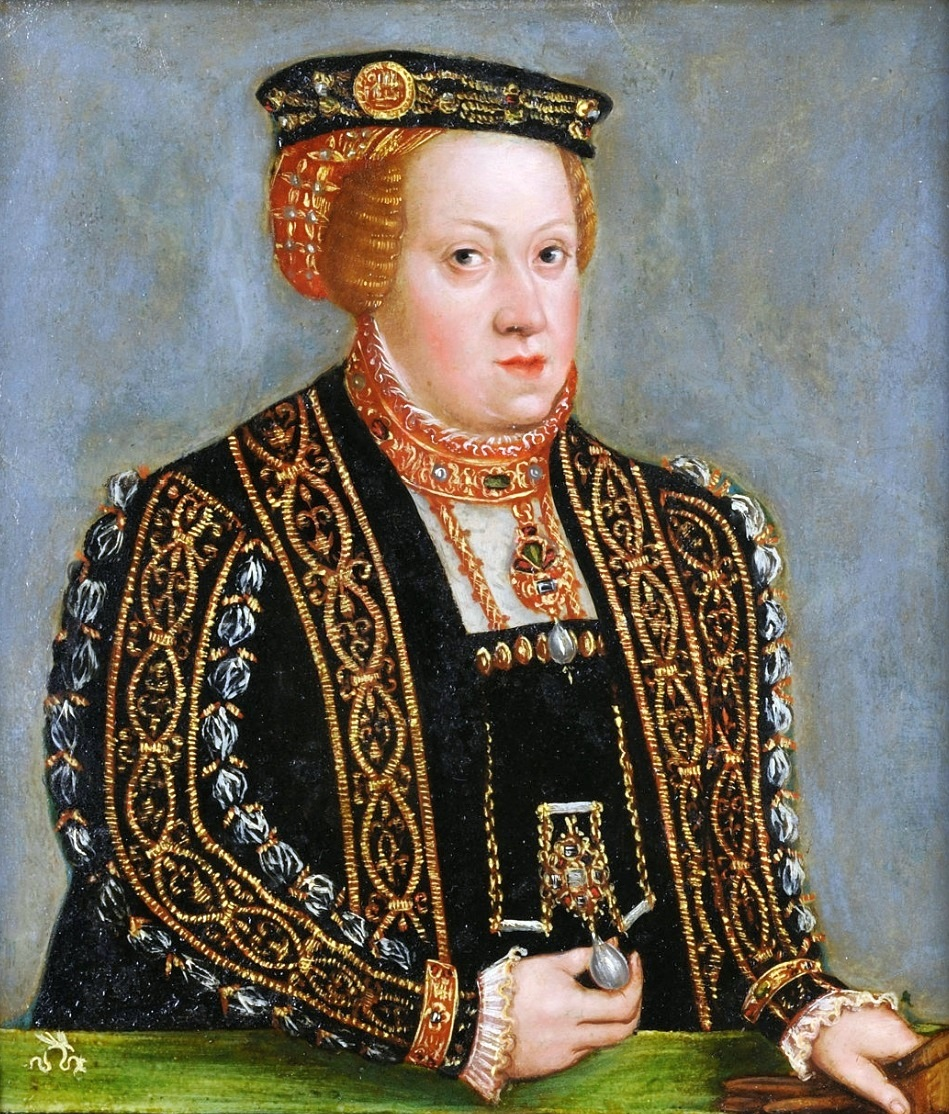
Catherine of Austria, Queen of Poland

- January 2 – Johann Major, German poet and theologian (d. 1600)
- January 3 – Jerónimo Bautista Lanuza, Spanish friar, bishop and writer (d. 1624)
- January 6 – Timotheus Kirchner, German theologian (d. 1587)
- January 28 – Paul Luther, German scientist (d. 1593)
- February 5 or February 16 – Andreas Dudith, Croatian-Hungarian nobleman and diplomat (d. 1589)
- February 2 – Shimazu Yoshihisa, Japanese samurai (d. 1611)
- February 16 – Gianfrancesco Gambara, Italian Catholic cardinal (d. 1587)
- February 28 – Michel de Montaigne, French essayist (d. 1592)
- March 10 – Francesco III Gonzaga, Duke of Mantua (d. 1550)
- April 5 – Giulio della Rovere, Italian Catholic cardinal (d. 1578)
- April 8 – Claudio Merulo, Italian composer and organist (d. 1604)
- April 24 – William I of Orange (d. 1584)
- May 2 – Philip II, Duke of Brunswick-Grubenhagen (d. 1596)
- July 20 – Martín de Rada, Spanish missionary (d. 1578)
- July 10 – Antonio Possevino, Italian diplomat (d. 1611)
- August 2 – Theodor Zwinger, Swiss scholar (d. 1588)
- August 7
  - Alonso de Ercilla y Zúñiga, Basque soldier and poet (d. 1595)
  - Valentin Weigel, German theologian (d. 1588)
- September 5 – Jacopo Zabarella, Italian philosopher (d. 1589)
- September 7 – Queen Elizabeth I of England, daughter of King Henry VIII (d. 1603)
- September 15 – Catherine of Austria, Queen of Poland (d. 1572)
- September 27 – Stefan Batory, King of Poland (d. 1586)
- October 9 – Henry V, Burgrave of Plauen (d. 1568)
- October 12 – Asakura Yoshikage, Japanese ruler (d. 1573)
- October 14 – Anna of Mecklenburg, duchess consort of Courland (1566-1587) (d. 1602)
- November 22 – Alfonso II d'Este, Duke of Ferrara, Italian noble (d. 1597)
- December 13 – King Eric XIV of Sweden (d. 1577)
- date unknown – Eknath, Indian Marathi saint (d. 1599)
- probable
  - Amina, Queen of Zazzua (d. 1610)
  - Cornelis Cort, Dutch engraver (d. 1578)
  - David Rizzio, Italian secretary of Mary, Queen of Scots (k. 1566)

== Deaths ==
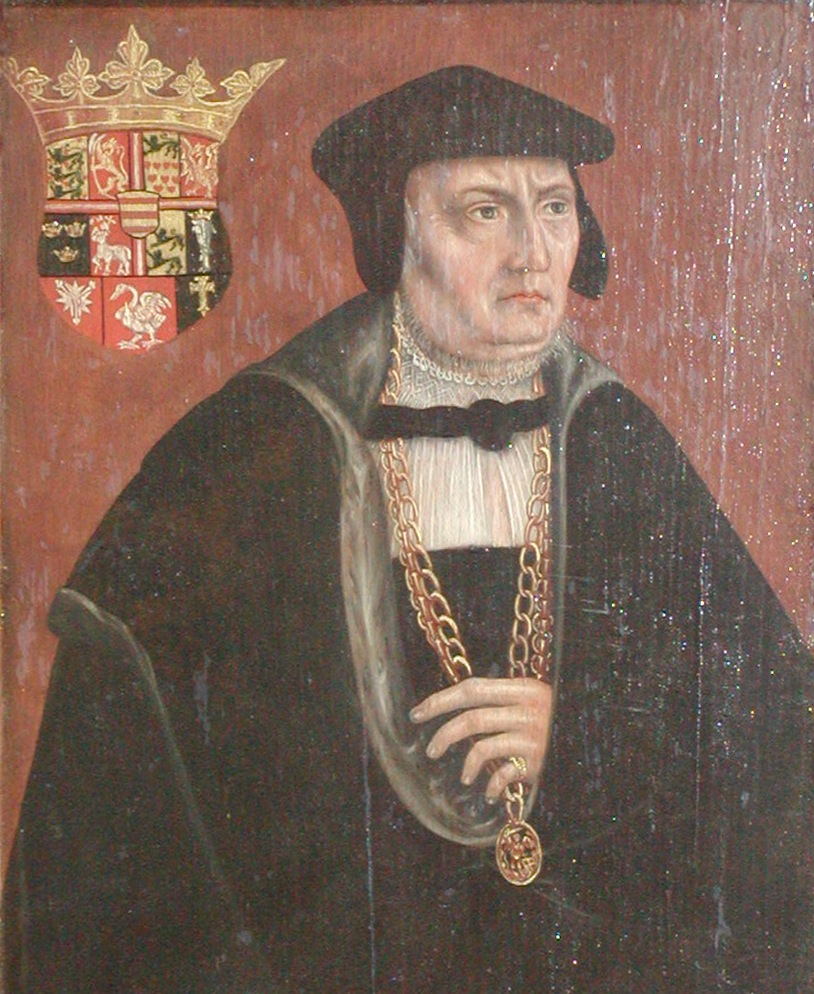
King Frederick I of Denmark

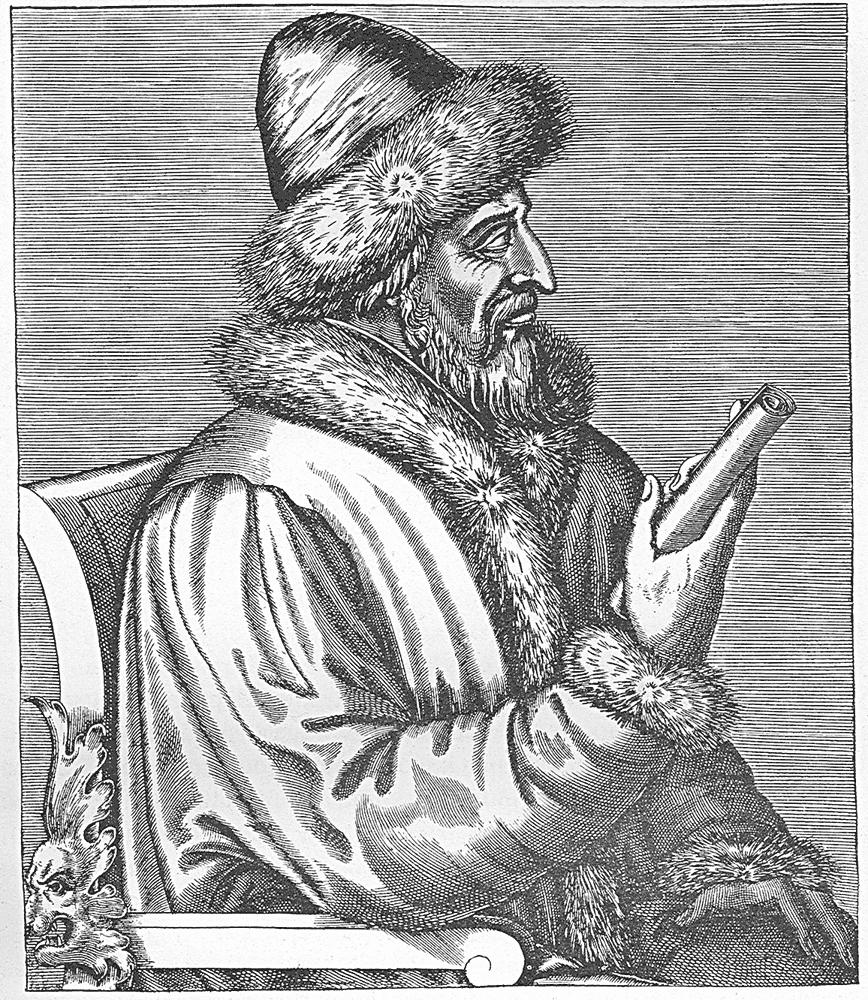
Grand Prince Vasili III of Muscovy

- March 16 – John Bourchier, 2nd Baron Berners, English soldier and statesman (b. 1467)
- April 10 – King Frederick I of Denmark (b. 1471)
- April 28 – Nicholas West, English bishop and diplomat (b. 1461)
- April 30 – John George, Marquis of Montferrat, Italian noble (b. 1488)
- June 25 – Mary Tudor, queen of Louis XII of France (b. 1496)
- July 4 – John Frith, English Protestant priest and martyr (b. 1503)
- July 6 – Ludovico Ariosto, Italian poet (b. 1474)
- July 26 – Atahualpa, last Inca ruler of Peru (executed) (b. c.1502)
- September 6 – Jacopo Salviati, Italian politician and son-in-law of Lorenzo de' Medici (b. 1461)
- September 17 – Philip I, Margrave of Baden (b. 1479)
- September 20 – Veit Stoss, German sculptor (b. c. 1447)
- October 10 – Severinus of Saxony, Prince of Saxony; died young (b. 1522)
- October – Túpac Huallpa, puppet ruler of Peru
- December 3 – Grand Prince Vasili III of Muscovy (b. 1479)
- date unknown
  - Alauddin Firuz Shah II, sultan of Bengal
  - Duarte Pacheco Pereira, Portuguese explorer (b. c. 1460)
  - Anne Rud, Danish noble and defender
  - Fortún Ximénez, Spanish sailor and mutineer
  - Bayin Htwe, king of Prome in Burma
  - Lucas van Leyden, Dutch artist (b. 1494)
- probable – Girolamo del Pacchia, Italian painter (b. 1477)
