= 1465 Fez revolt =

Uprising and end of the Marinid dynasty

- Location within Morocco
- Date: 1465
- Location: Fez; 34.0181°N 5.0078°W
- Outcome: End of the Marinid dynasty; Establishment of a short-lived rule in Fez under the sharif Muhammad ibn Imran; Establishment of the Wattasid dynasty in 1471; Massacre of the Jews; Established precedent of rule by sharifs

The 1465 Fez revolt was a popular uprising in the Marinid capital of Fez against Sultan Abd al-Haqq II, the final ruler of the Marinid dynasty, and his Jewish vizier, Harun ibn Batash.

The Marinid Sultanate faced a severe crisis in the mid-15th century, exacerbated by progressive Portuguese incursions into its territory. The Marinid sultans, the nominal rulers, held little power outside the capital of Fez, while much of their former realm was controlled by the Wattasids, a powerful family of viziers. In 1458, Sultan Abd al-Haqq II launched a successful coup to reclaim direct power from the Wattasids. He subsequently appointed Jewish officials, notably Harun ibn Batash, to high-ranking administrative positions, a move that generated significant resentment among the majority-Muslim population of Fez.

According to traditional accounts, the revolt was sparked in 1465 by allegations that a Jewish official had assaulted a female sharif. This prompted a local preacher to call for Jihad, culminating in a pogrom against the city's Jewish community. The uprising was heavily supported, and possibly orchestrated, by Muhammad ibn Imran, the leader of the sharifs of Fez. During the unrest, Sultan Abd al-Haqq II was lynched or executed by the mob, effectively ending the Marinid dynasty, and Muhammad ibn Imran briefly assumed control of the city.

Following the revolt, the Wattasids attempted to regain power but faced opposition from Muhammad ibn Imran. This conflict culminated in 1471 when the Wattasid leader Muhammad al-Sheikh conquered Fez, though at the cost of ceding significant territory to the Portuguese. The Wattasids, who maintained the traditional Berber tribal structure of earlier regional dynasties, were ultimately discredited by their inability to halt the Portuguese advance. In the 16th century, they were overthrown by the Saadis, a non-tribal dynasty of sharifs. Because the territory has been governed by sharifian dynasties ever since, Abun-Nasr view the 1465 uprising, despite its failure to establish lasting sharifian control at the time, a harbinger of the rule by sharifs which would shape the region's subsequent history.

== Background ==
By the mid-fifteenth century, the Marinid Sultanate was in severe crisis. Its effective control was limited to the city of Fez, with large portions of the countryside being controlled by their vizier family, the Wattasids. The final sultan, Abd al-Haqq II, had been placed on the throne at the age of one in 1420 by his Wattasid vizier. He remained a puppet of successive viziers for thirty-eight years until a 1458 coup in which the sultan successfully took power after massacring most of the Wattasids. At the same time, the Portuguese began conquering significant parts of what is now Morocco beginning with the capture of Ceuta in 1415. The Berber tribes whose warriors underpinned the Marinid kingdom proved itself incapable of defending the country. In 1462, Castile seized Gibraltar, the last Moroccan outpost in Europe.

Morocco was also undergoing a religious transformation. Two Sufi brotherhoods, the Qadiriyya and especially the Shadhiliyya, expanded throughout the country and popularized the notion of hereditary barakah or sacredness. The renewed focus on inherited sanctity advanced the prestige of the sharifs: descendants of Muhammad by his great-great-great-grandson Idris I, the eighth-century founder of the Moroccan kingdom. The great popularity of the Shadhiliyya brotherhood led by Muhammad al-Jazuli, which included large numbers of sharifs in its ranks, contributed to the increased devotion accorded to the sharifs, as did the putative Wattasid discovery in 1437 of the tomb of Idris's son and their decision to build a sanctuary honoring him. In the face of the failure of the Marinids and their tribal backers against European invasion, the sharifs were increasingly looked up to as "symbols of disenchantment with tribal leadership and of the determination to resist the foreign enemies of the country and the faith."

Meanwhile, large numbers of Spanish Jews had migrated to Fez since 1391 and became more and more important in the commercial life of the city.

== Revolution and Massacre of the Jews ==
The earliest and most detailed account of the 1465 revolution in Fez, which ended two centuries of Marinid rule, comes from the diary of Abd al-Basit ibn Khalil, an Egyptian merchant who arrived in the Kingdom of Tlemcen in 1464 intending to visit the neighboring Moroccan realm. While at Tlemcen, he learned the news of the 1465 revolution first-hand and decided to avoid the turmoil, going to Granada instead. Abd al-Basit's narrative is consistent with the traditional Moroccan accounts first compiled centuries after the revolution. But as the Egyptian was not an eyewitness, his account may reflect the official, propagandistic narrative that Muhammad ibn Imran, the new ruler of Fez, desired to portray to his neighbors in Tlemcen. Historian Mercedes Garcia-Arenal notes that the story appears apologetic.

According to Abd al-Basit, once Abd al-Haqq had massacred most of the Wattasids, he appointed a surviving Wattasid as a vizier in name, but with no real power, simply for the purpose of humiliating him. He then named the Jewish moneylender Harun ibn Batash as the de facto vizier, as Jews did not have independent power bases. Harun proceeded to give important government positions to his fellow Jews, which was very unpopular in the majority-Muslim city. In 1465, the sultan and Harun left Fez for a while, leaving Harun's relative Shawil ibn Batash to rule Fez. Shawil's rule was opposed by the citizens, and a riot began when he insulted and struck a female sharif.

A khatib (preacher) who heard this began calling for a jihad against the Jews, and was joined by large numbers of the poorer citizens of Fez. The mob demanded that Muhammad ibn Imran, the head of the sharifs of Fez, give his sanction for a rebellion against the government. Ibn Imran refused, saying that the ulama or scholars should be consulted. The mob then went to the senior mufti of Fez, demanding that he write them a fatwa or juridical opinion approving of the rebellion. When the mufti refused, the mob threatened to kill him until he finally agreed that a massacre of the Jews and a rebellion against the sultan were religiously permissible. Having received the necessary clerical support, the urban mob then invaded the Jewish quarter and killed every Jew, then stormed the palace and killed Shawil. The sharif Muhammad ibn Imran was installed as ruler of Fez.

The rebels then sent a letter to Abd al-Haqq, saying that they were willing to return his throne to him should he return. Harun opposed the idea, suggesting that they go to the town of Taza instead, but the sultan refused to listen. A Marinid prince then executed the vizier. When Abd al-Haqq did arrive at Fez, he was pulled off his horse by a gang of young men and lynched at a slaughterhouse on May 18, 1465, in the holy month of Ramadan. The surviving Wattasids attempted to return to power in Fez but were rebuffed by Muhammad ibn Imran's new regime, while pogroms of Jews occurred in other cities throughout Morocco as the news spread.

The traditional Moroccan account, still presented in modern Moroccan textbooks, derives from the historian Ahmad Ibn al-Qadi in the 1590s. Al-Qadi's account is largely congruent with Abd al-Basit's account, certain details notwithstanding: Harun proposes Meknes and not Taza as a refuge, and the sultan is killed on May 23 and not May 18. But it removes the apologetic description of Muhammad ibn Imran being reluctant to take power and does not feature a mufti at all. Instead, the sharif is portrayed as leading the mob in both the attack on the Jewish quarter and the killing of Abd al-Haqq, which is not the work of a gang of youth but a public execution officiated by Ibn Imran himself, who strips the sultan of his regalia and puts him on a donkey before the citizens of Fez. Although Europeans had only a very cursory understanding of events in the Moroccan court, they also believed that the sharif had instigated the revolution.

Meanwhile, a number of traditional Moroccan biographies of Sufi saints suggest that there was a group of ulama and other Muslim leaders who opposed the revolution in some capacity. One of the prominent leaders of the opposition was Ahmad Zarruq, who was forced to leave his hometown of Fez after facing opposition to the point of being accused of being a Jew. When Zarruq returned to Fez in 1474, he was met with a "social boycott" and was soon obliged to leave Morocco forever.

A seventeenth-century account independent of traditional Moroccan historiography—a polemical tract condemning the Muhajirin, a group of merchants in Fez who were originally Jews but had long ago sincerely converted to Islam—gives a significantly different series of events. The Muhajirin had traditionally been barred from certain markets by the older Muslim merchants of Fez, including the sharifs. But because Abd al-Haqq, his Jewish vizier Harun, and other Jewish officials were hard-pressed for money, the government annulled the restrictions on the Muhajirin. They began to outcompete the sharif merchants until the 1465 revolution, after which they were all expelled from Fez. The account makes no mention of the abuse of a woman sharif or of a massacre of the Jews.

No Jewish source from before the nineteenth century makes any mention of the massacre. As there is documentation of a thriving Jewish community in Fez in the 1470s, Garcia-Arena is skeptical that there was any pogrom against the Jews at all. Many of the Jews of Fez appear to have temporarily converted to Islam to escape the pogrom before being allowed to return to Judaism by the Wattasids who took power in 1471. Other members of the Jewish community of Fez in the 1470s may have been refugees from the Portuguese invasion.

== Legacy ==
As supporters of the sharifs, the surviving Wattasids may have naturally expected to be restored to power by the revolution, but Muhammad ibn Imran refused to allow them to enter the city. After a war of several years, the head of the surviving Wattasids, Muhammad al-Sheikh, conquered Fez in 1471 and eliminated the sharif's regime with the support of former Marinid retainers, but at the cost of losing the towns of Asilah, Larache, and Tangiers to the Portuguese. Over the next few decades, the Wattasids' traditional tribal form of monarchy was discredited by its utter incapability to curb the Portuguese invasion. They were eventually overthrown by the Saadi dynasty of sharifs from southern Morocco, who expelled the Portuguese and initiated a new trend in Moroccan history—of which the 1465 revolution was an early augur—of non-tribal sharif dynasties whose legitimacy was bolstered by their prophetic bloodline. The current ruling dynasty of Morocco, the Alaouites, remains a sharif dynasty.

The Jewish community of Fez existed again by the 1470s, benefiting from Wattasid protection and patronage of the Jews; the Jewish historian Abraham ben Solomon calls Muhammad al-Sheikh a righteous man. However, they continued to suffer from prejudice, including another massacre in 1492.
