= Muhammad al-Qa'im =

Muḥammad al-Qāʾim (or al-Ḳāʾim) may refer to:

- Hujjat Allah al-Mahdi (b. c. 870), twelfth imam according Twelver Shia Islam
- Abu al-Qasim Muhammad al-Qa'im, second Fatimid Caliph
- Abu Abdallah al-Qaim, Saadi ruler of Morocco from 1510 to 1517
