= Debdou =

Debdou دبدو ⴷⴱⴷⵓ
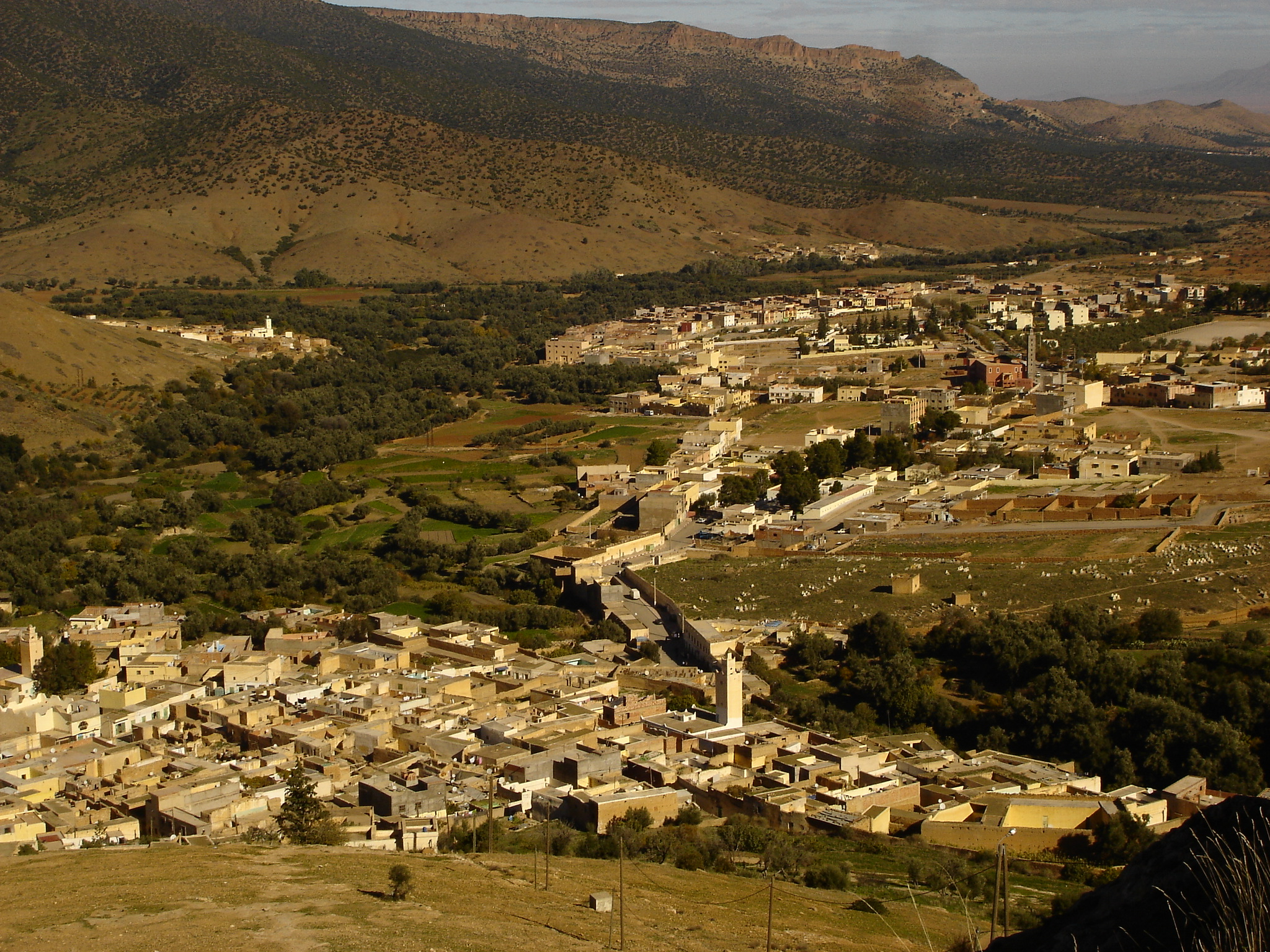
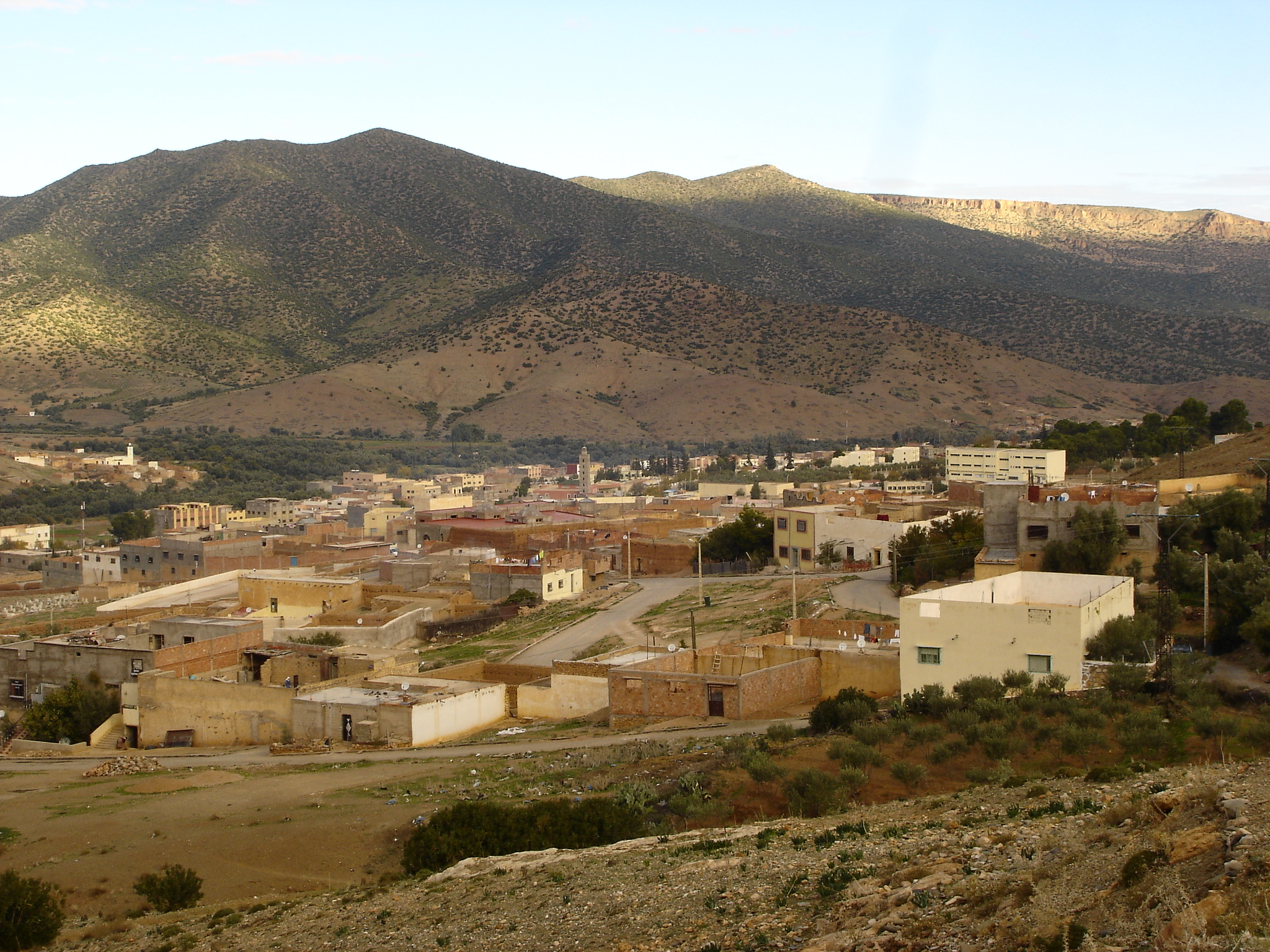
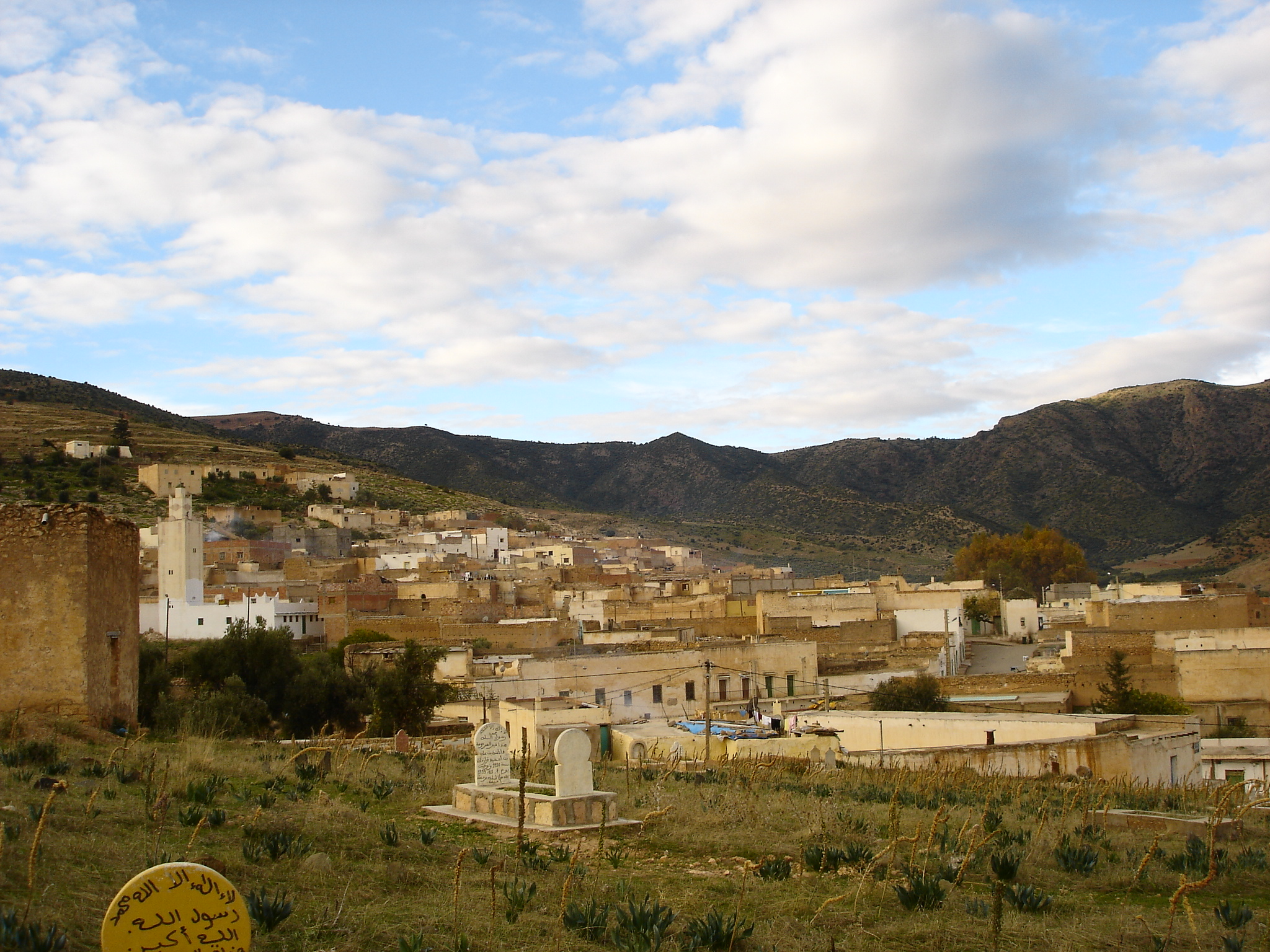
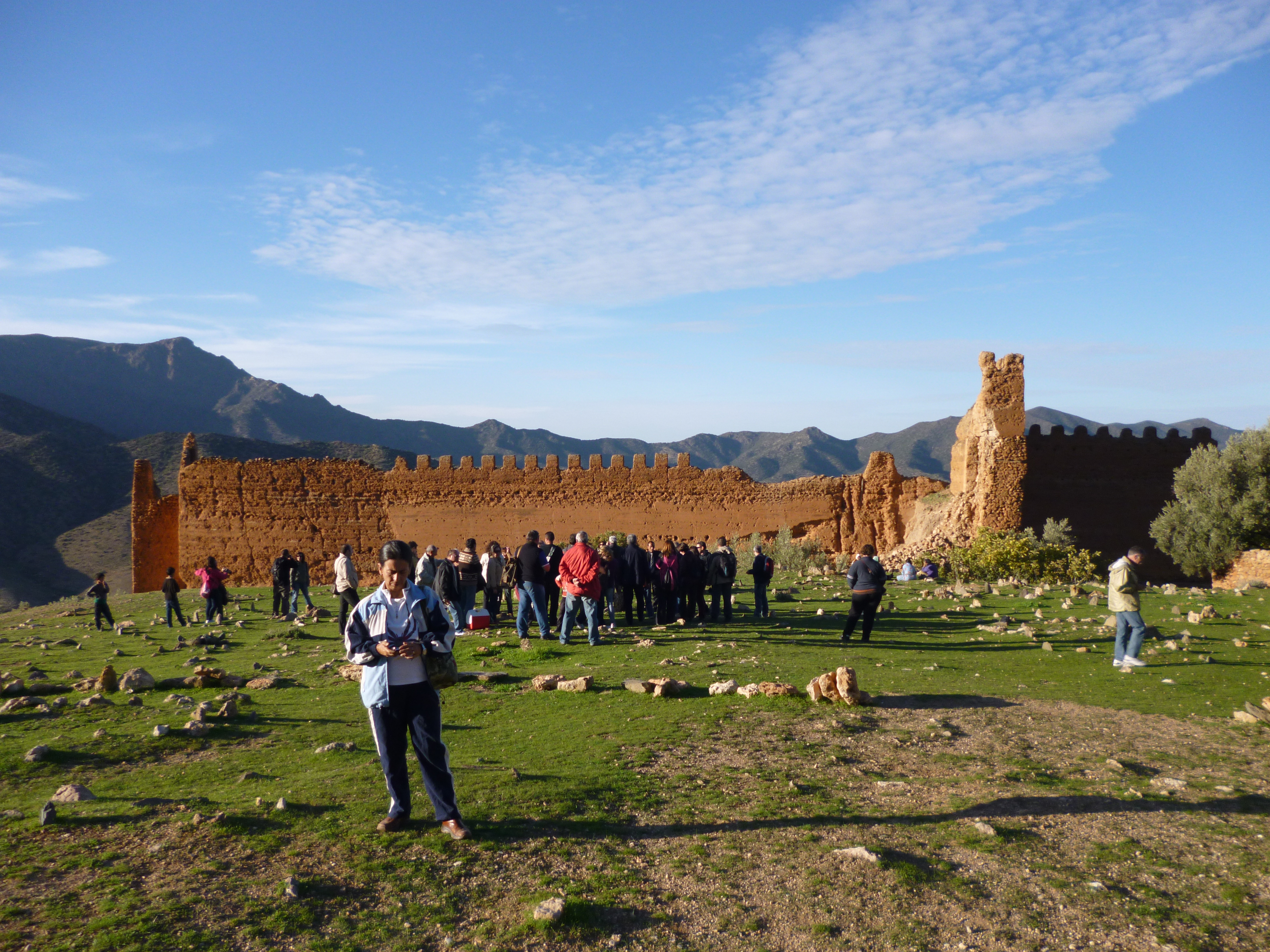
- Debdou view from Kasbah
- Interactive map of Debdou
- Coordinates: 33°59′0″N 3°2′22″W
- Country: Morocco
- Region: Oriental
- Province: Taourirt Province

Population (2004)
  - Total: 4,596
- Time zone: UTC+0 (GMT)

Debdou (Arabic: دبدو, Standard Moroccan Tamazight: ⴷⴱⴷⵓ) is a town in Taourirt Province in eastern Morocco. It is known for its historically multi-ethnic population, including Berbers and Moroccan Jews.

The Ait Urtajjen, a Berber family related to the Moroccan dynasty of the Wattasids, had their own semi-independent state here from 1430 until 1563.

== Jewish centre ==
Debdou was a major Jewish centre in Morocco. The town was settled by many Sephardic Jews from Seville, fleeing the wave of anti-Jewish riots in Spain in 1391. The earliest to settle were the clan of Cohen-Scali-Benzhor who reached Debdou in the 11th century, fleeing Sicily, a family of Jewish priests said to trace their lineage to Zadok, the High Priest.

At the end of the 19th and beginning of the 20th century the town was briefly renowned as a centre of Jewish learning, exporting rabbis to many cities in Morocco.

At the end of the 19th century the town's population was estimated at 2000 inhabitants, most of them Jews.

At the beginning of the 20th century the number of Jews was estimated at 1600, who formed roughly a third of the population.

Following the establishment of the French protectorate, with the concomitant rise in security, the majority of the Jewish population gradually emigrated to nearby towns in the plains.

== Gallery ==
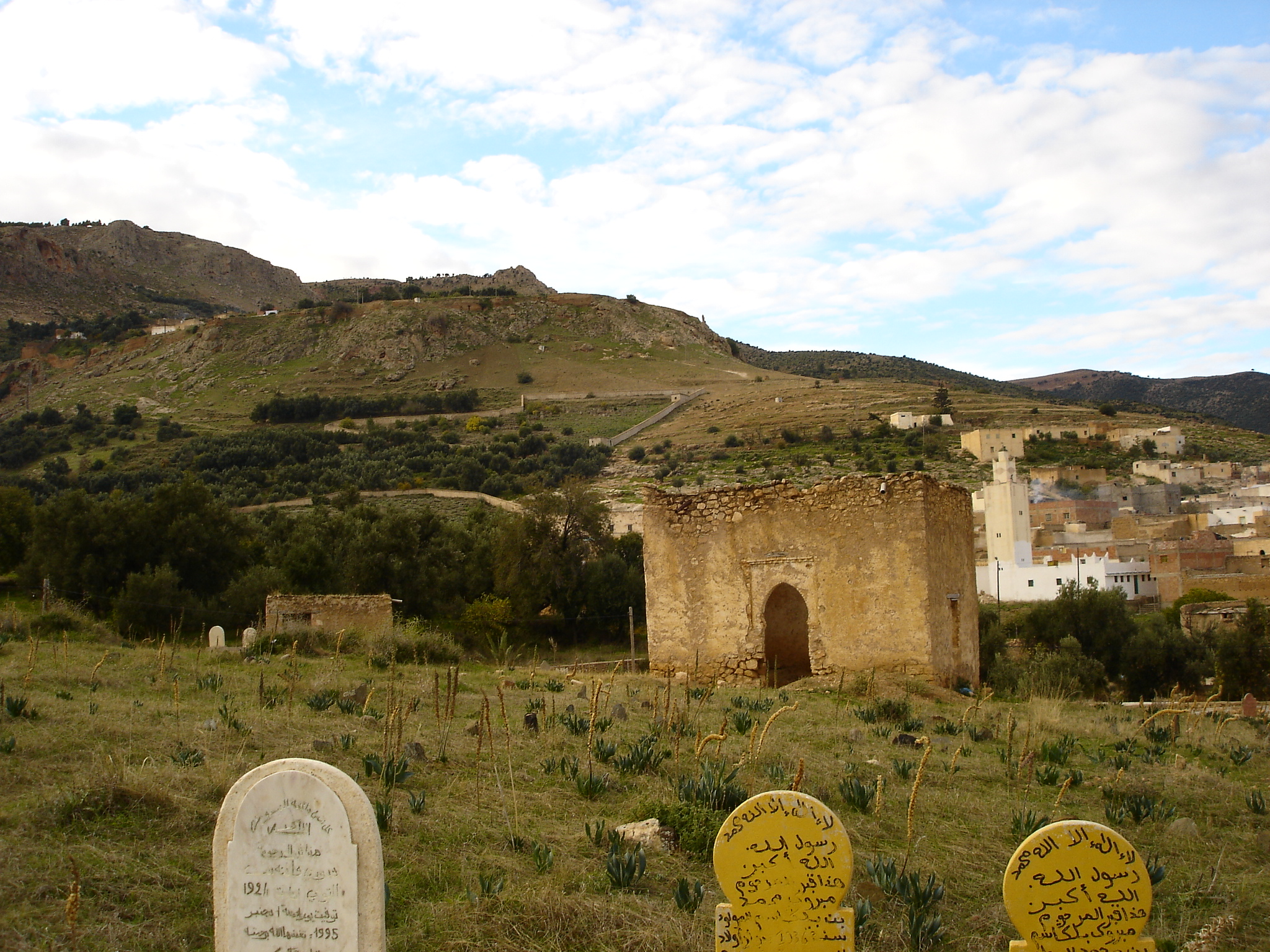
Former Marinid cemetery.

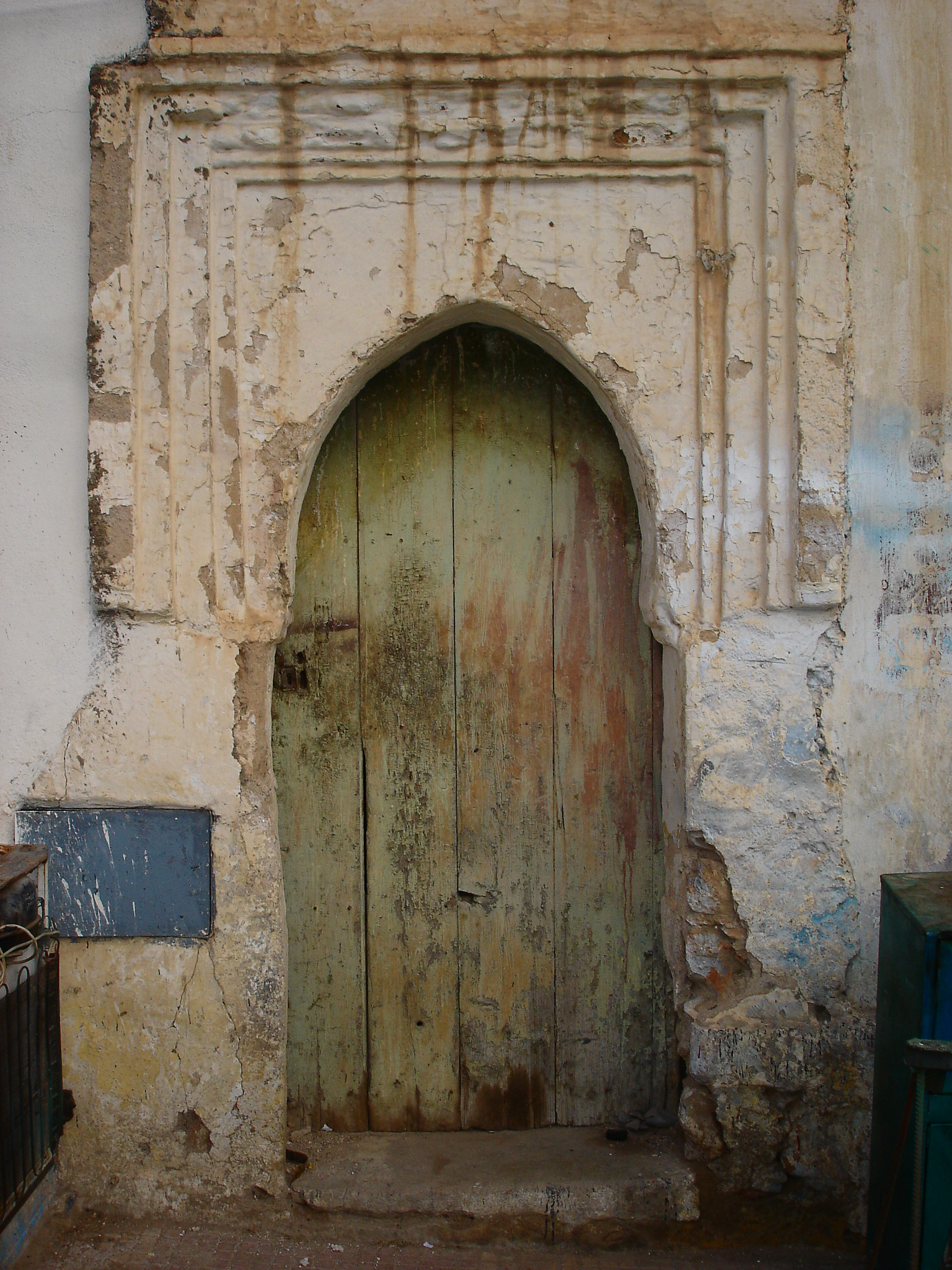
The door of the typical Jewish house.

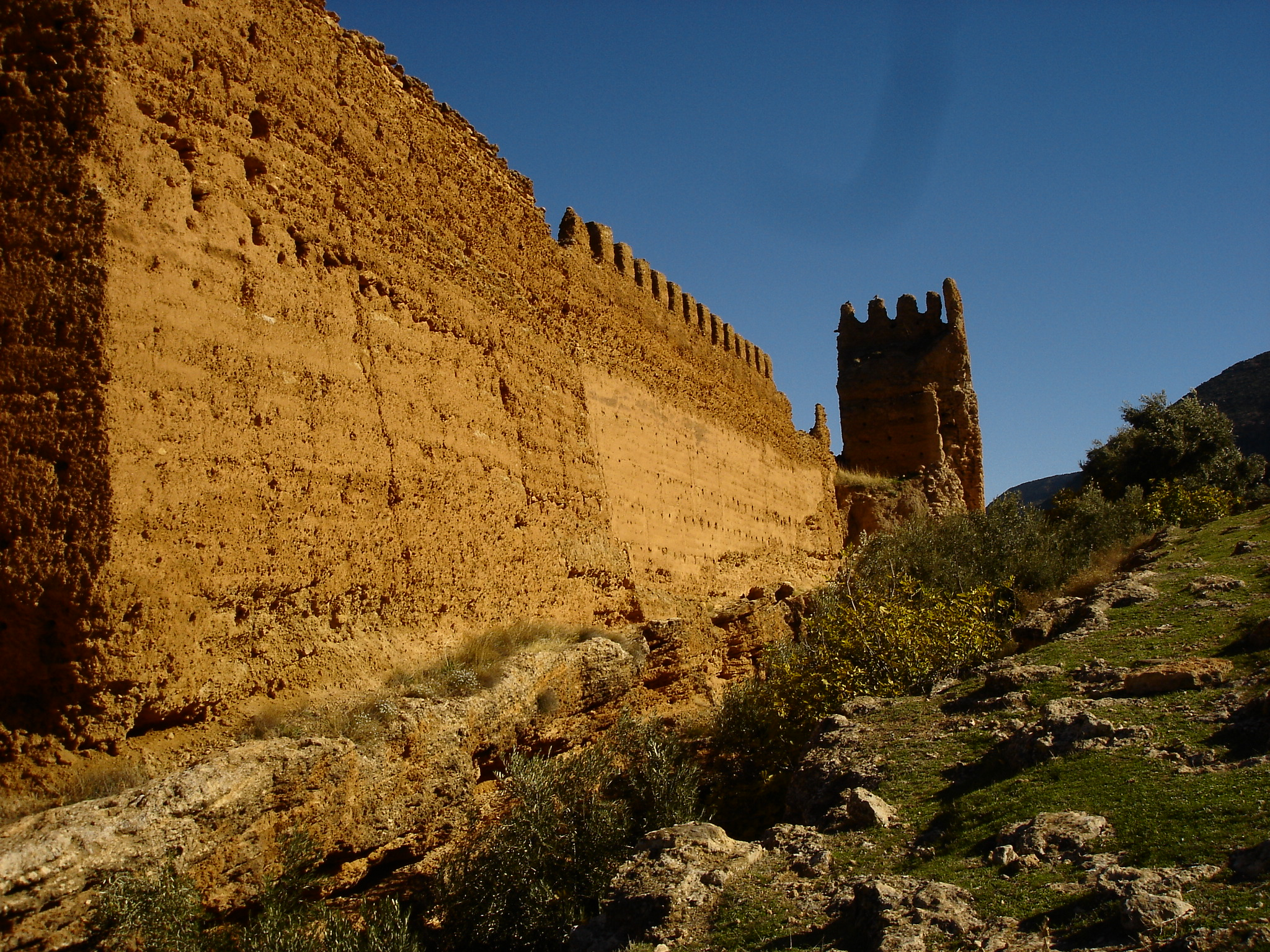
Former Marinid kasbah.

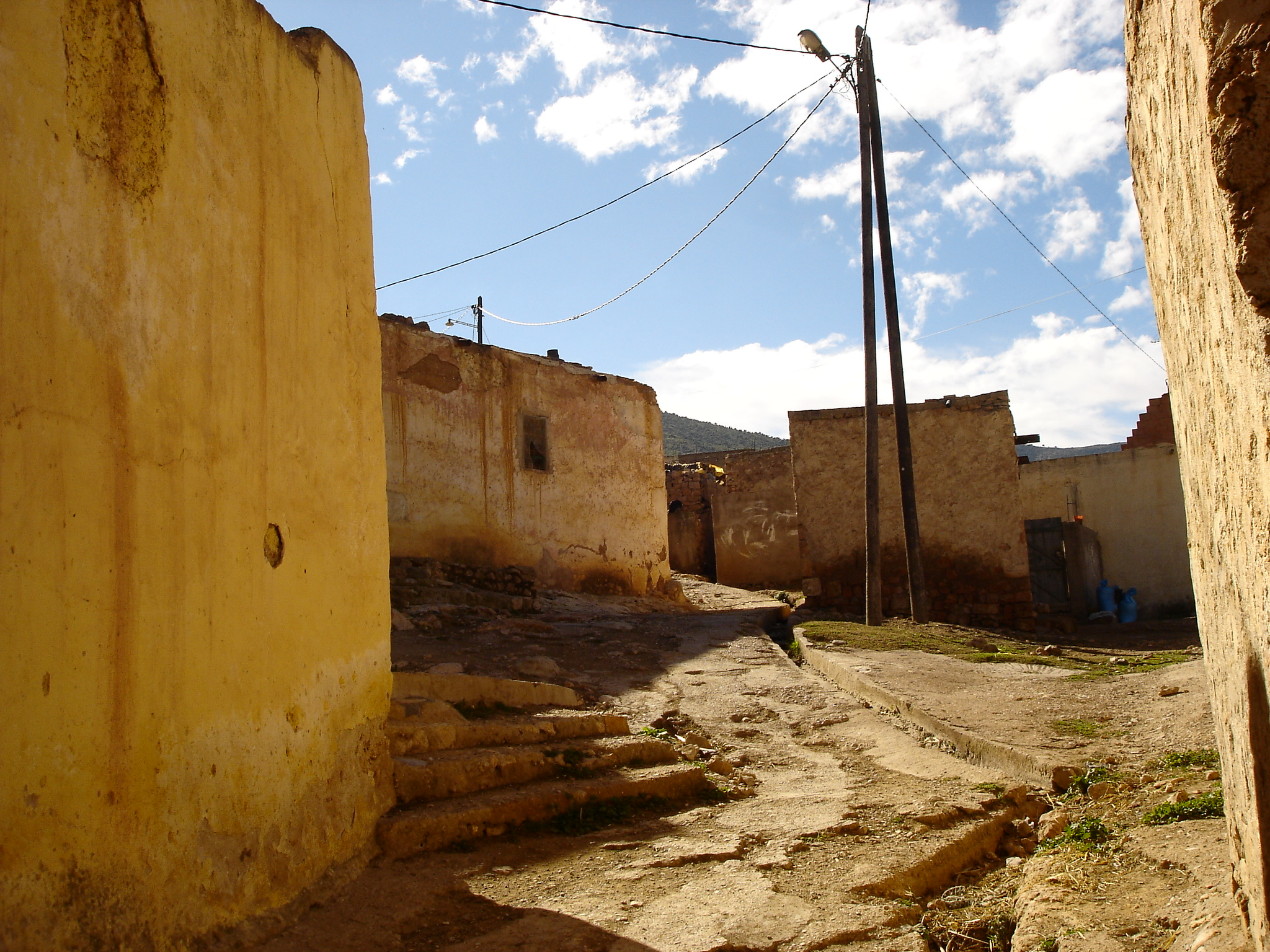
Typical street in Debdou.
