= Principality of Debdou =

Moroccan viceroyalty

Principality of Debdou إمارة دبدو (Arabic)
- 1430–1563
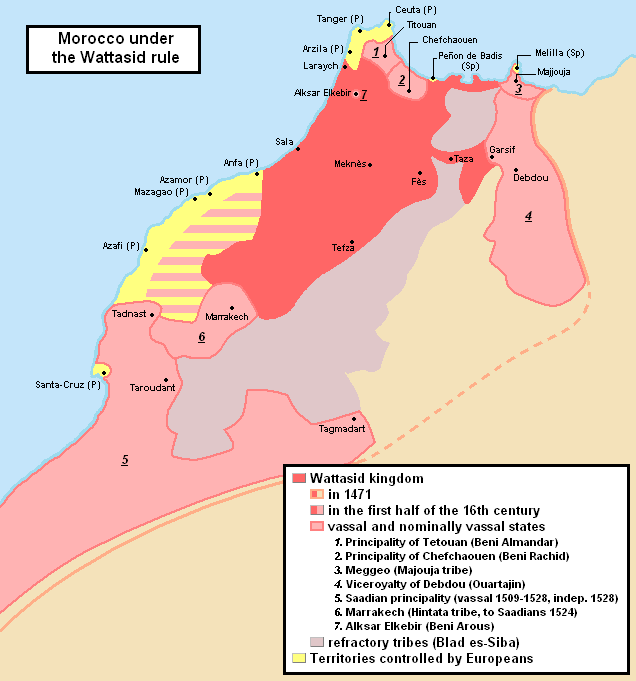
- Map of Morocco in 1515. The Principality of Debdou is in the east.
- Capital: Debdou
- Religion: Islam, Judaism
- Government: Hereditary monarchy
- Emir
  - 1430–1460 (first): Musa ibn Hammu
  - 1460–1485: Ahmad ibn Musa
  - 1485–1515: Muhammad ibn Ahmad
  - 1515–1550: Muhammad II
  - 1550–1563 (last): Ammar
- History
  - Established: 1430
  - Disestablished: 1563
Preceded by	Succeeded by
Marinid Sultanate	Saadi Sultanate
- Today part of: Morocco

The Principality of Debdou was an autonomous hereditary viceroyalty that existed in eastern Morocco from 1430 to 1563, with its capital at Debdou. It was governed by the Ouartajin, a dynasty of Berber descent, related to the Marinids and Wattasids.

== History ==
The Principality of Debdou was first established in 1430 as a governorate of Morocco, then ruled by the Marinids. Debdou served as a march of the Marinid Sultanate against the Abd al-Wadid Kingdom of Tlemcen.

By the second half of the 15th century, the Ouartajin gained more autonomy towards Fez, as the Marinids lost their prestige and most of their power to the Wattasid Viziers. The Principality became fully autonomous when Muhammad ibn Ahmed was appointed Viceroy of Debdou by the Wattasid Sultan Muhammad ibn Yahya (r. 1472–1504).

During the last years of the reign of Muhammad II, the Principality of Debdou became a tributary state of the Saadians. Moulay Ammar assisted the Ottomans in the Capture of Fez in 1554 and later defected to the Saadians in the Battle of Wadi al-Laban in 1558 against the Turks of Hasan Pasha. In 1563, the Saadi Sultan Abdallah al-Ghalib overthrew the Ouartajin and made Debdou a fully dependent Pashalik of Morocco, serving to defend against the Ottoman Empire.

== List of Emirs ==
Reign	Emir	Notes
1430–1460	Musa ibn Hammu	Appointed governor of Debdou.
1460–1485	Ahmad ibn Musa	
1485–1515	Muhammad ibn Ahmad	Appointed Viceroy of Debdou after being besieged by Muhammad ibn Yahya.
1515–1550	Muhammad II	Became tributary of the Saadi Sultanate.
1550–1563	Ammar	Annexation of the Principality following his death by Abdallah al-Ghalib.
