= Hémon de Molon =

16th-century French explorer and trader

Hémon de Molon was a French trader from Bresse, who went to Morocco in 1531.

In 1532, he returned to France with enticing stories about the country of Morocco, and a letter from the Wattasid Sultan of Fes Ahmad ibn Muhammad to Francis I of France.

In response, in 1533 Francis I decided to send an official mission to Morocco, led by Pierre de Piton, to which Hémon de Molon also participated, and accompanied by 5 other gentlemen.
