= Pierre de Piton =

16th-century French colonel and ambassador

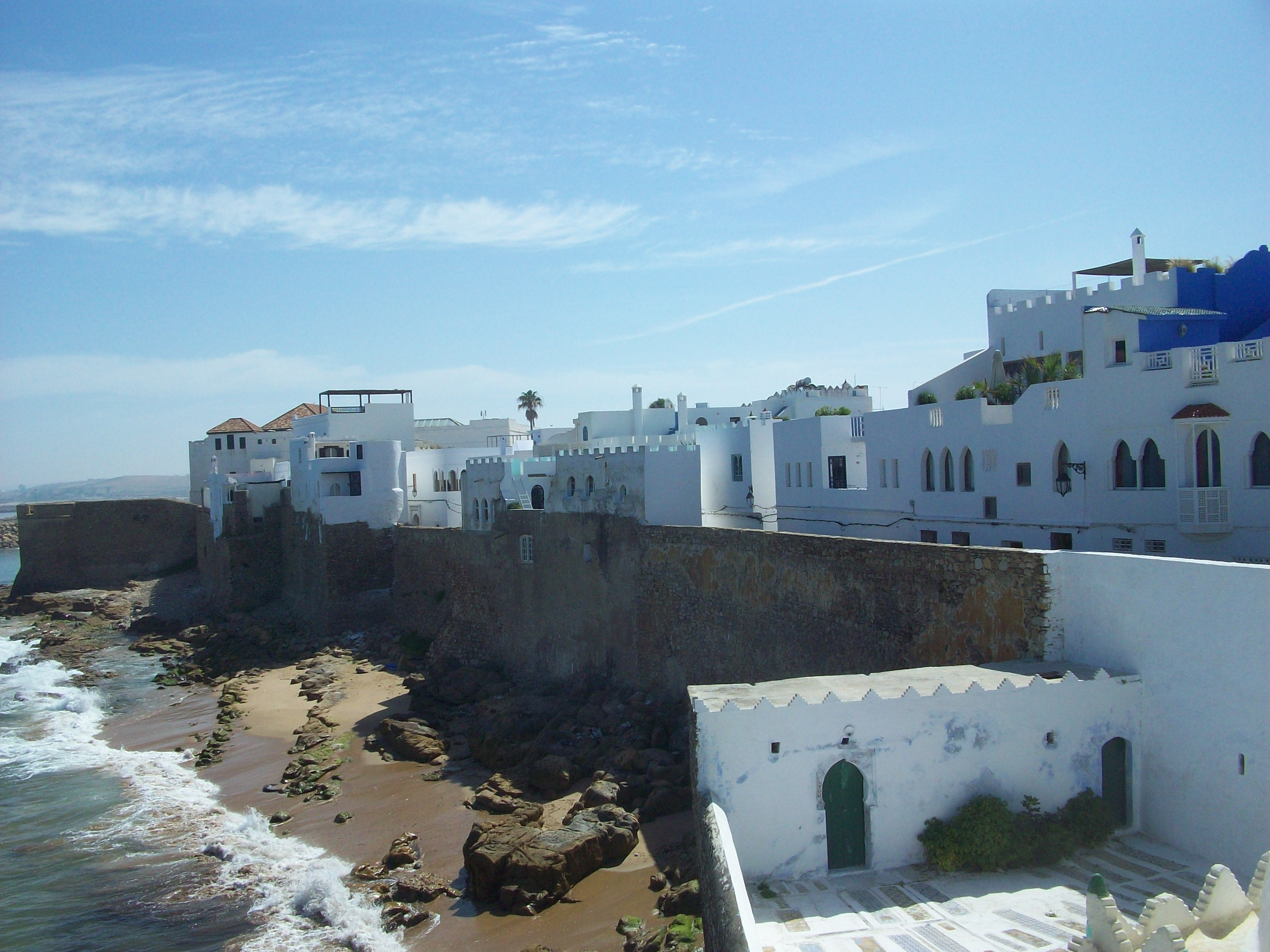
The Genoese captain betrayed Pierre de Piton and went to the Portuguese in Arzila.

Pierre de Piton was a French colonel of the 16th century, and an ambassador to the kingdom of Morocco. He was sent in 1533 by Francis I, initiating France-Morocco relations.

Pierre de Piton sailed to Morocco to the harbour of Larache on the royal galleass Le Saint-Pierre, equipped with 28 cannons, and captained by the Genoese Baptiste Auxyllia. Pierre de Piton was accompanied by 5 men, as well as French trader Hémon de Molon, who had brought enthusiastic reports from Morocco in a trip there in 1531–32, as well as a letter from the Sultan to Francis I.

Following Pierre de Piton's embassy, in a letter to Francis I dated August 13, 1533, the Wattassid ruler of Fez, Ahmed ben Mohammed, welcomed French overtures and granted freedom of shipping and protection of French traders. France started to send ships to Morocco in 1555, under the rule of Henry II, son of Francis I.

The Genoese captain later betrayed Pierre de Piton during the time he was in Fes, by going to the Portuguese in Arzila and claiming that de Piton was selling weapons to the Sultan.
