= Ahmad al-Araj =

2nd Ruler of Saadi Dynasty

Ahmed al-Araj
- 2nd Ruler of Saadi Dynasty
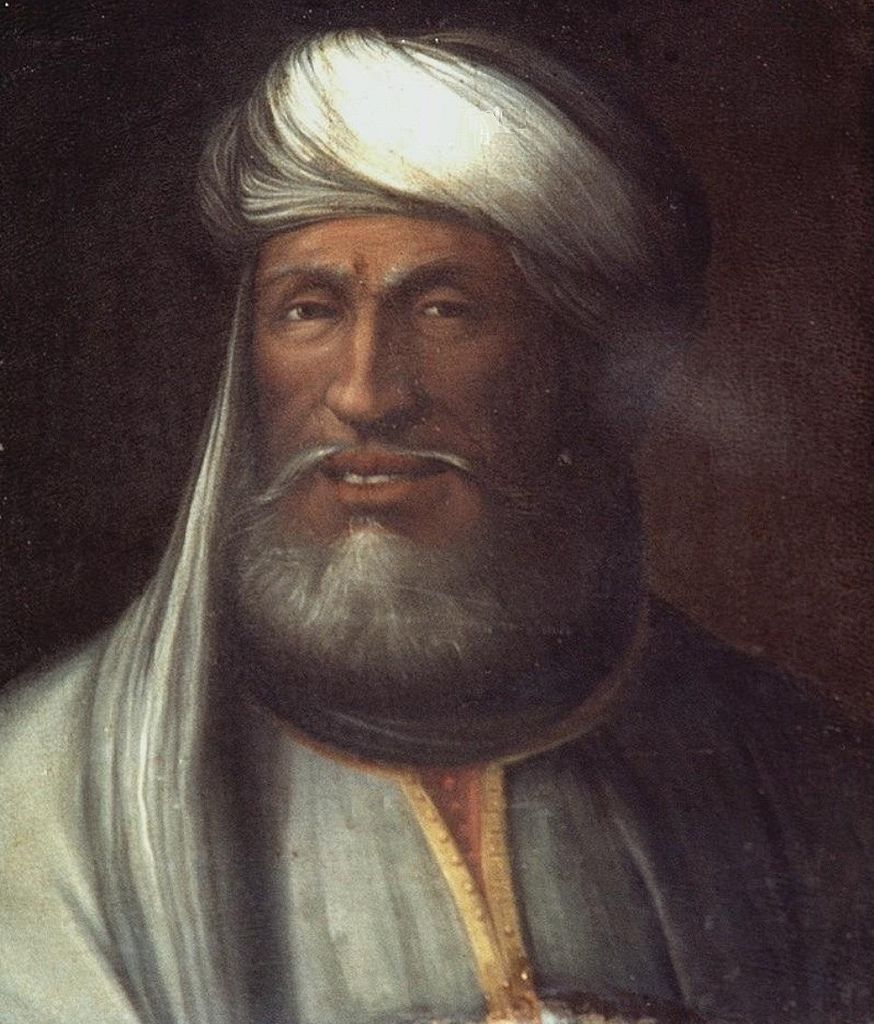
- Portrait of Ahmed al-Araj.

Emir of Marrakesh (Sultan of Morocco)
- Reign: 1517 – 1544
- Predecessor: Abu Abdallah al-Qaim
- Successor: Mohammed al-Shaykh
- Born: 1486
- Died: 1557 (aged 70–71); Marrakesh, Saadi Sultanate
- Spouse: Princess Umm al Banin Bû Shentuf
- Issue: Sayyida Aicha al-Sâadiya; Sayyida Oum Kalthum; Abbas al-Sâadi; Zaydan al-Sâadi
Names
- Ahmad al-Araj bin Mohammed
Era dates
- 16th Century
- House: Saadi Dynasty
- Father: Abu Abdallah al-Qaim
- Religion: Sunni Islam

Ahmad al-Araj (Arabic: أحمد الأعرج السعدي r. 1517–1544) (b. 1486 – d. 1557) was a ruler of the Saadi Dynasty. He became ruler of Marrakesh after conquering the city in 1525.

Some sources refer to him as Sultan of Marrakesh. Ahmad was a son of Abu Abdallah al-Qaim and brother of his successor Muhammad al-Shaykh, the first Saadi sultan to rule.

Preceded by Abu Abdallah al-Qaim	Saadi Dynasty; 1517–1544	Succeeded by Mohammed ash-Sheikh
