= Nasir ad-Din al-Qasri Muhammad ibn Ahmad =

Sultan of Fez from 1545 to 1547

Nasir al-Qasri
- Sultan of Fez

Sultan of Fez
- Reign: 1545 – 1547
- Predecessor: Abu al-Abbas Ahmad ibn Muhammad
- Successor: Abu al-Abbas Ahmad ibn Muhammad (second reign)
- Born: Unknown
- Died: 1547
Names
- Nasir ad-Din al-Qasri Muhammad ibn Ahmad
- Dynasty: Banū Wattās
- Father: Abu al-Abbas Ahmad ibn Muhammad

Nasir ad-Din al-Qasri Muhammad ibn Ahmad (Arabic: ناصر الدين القصري), also Nasir al-Qasiri, was the young son of the Sultan of Fez, Sultan Ahmad.

== Life ==
In 1545, his father Sultan Ahmad was taken prisoner by his southern rivals the Saadians. His successor, Ali Abu Hassun, regent for Nasir al-Qasiri, decided to pledge allegiance to the Ottomans in order to obtain their support.

He ruled with a regent from 1545 to 1547 during the imprisonment of his father by the Saadians.
