= Ali Abu Hassun =

16th-century ruler

- Reign: 1549 – 1554
- Predecessor: Abu al-Abbas Ahmad ibn Muhammad
- Successor: Mohammed al-Shaykh
- Died: September 1554
- Abu al-Hasan Abu Hasun Ali ibn Muhammad
- Dynasty: Banū Wattās

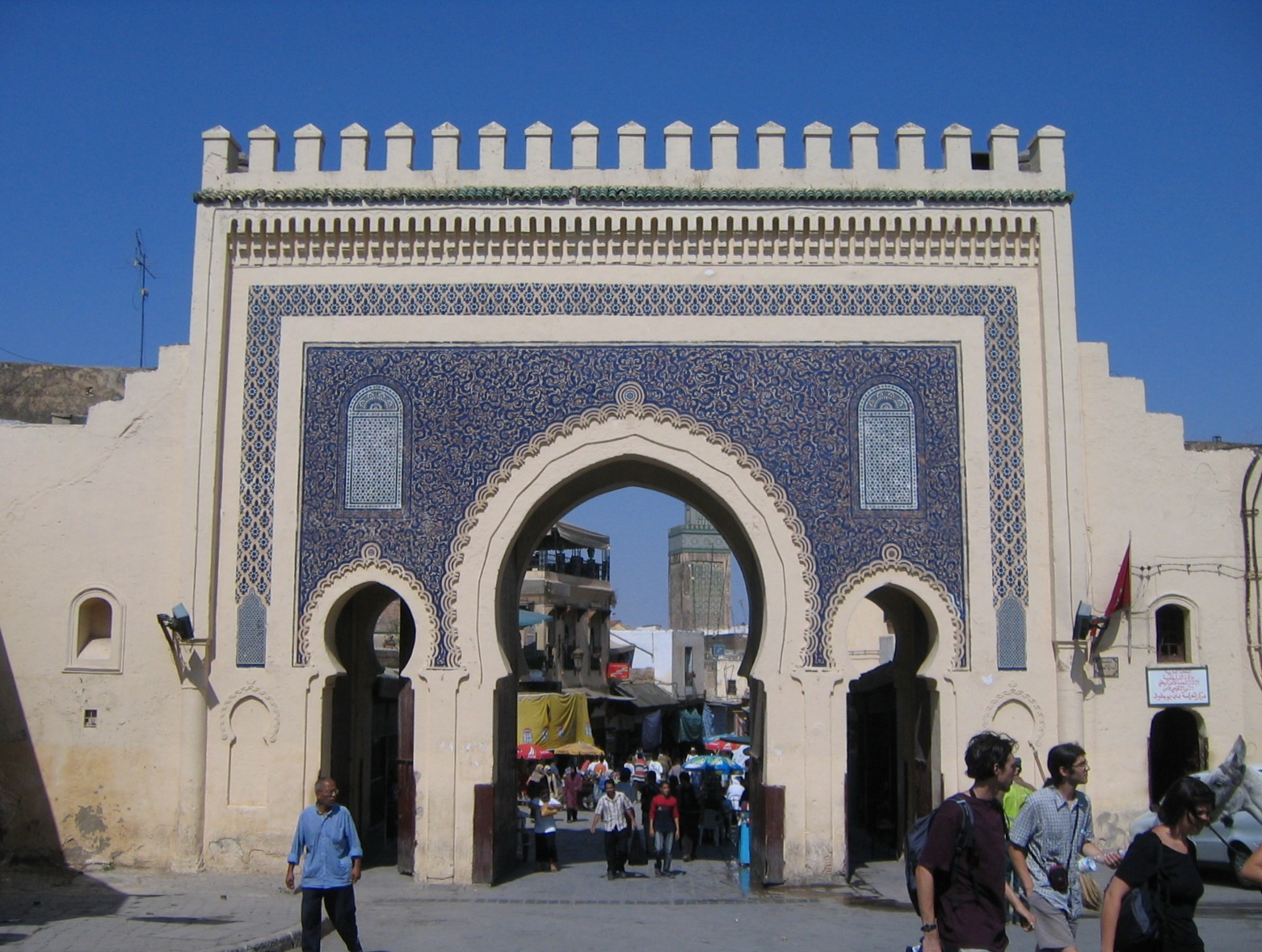
Ali Abu Hassun ruled in Fes as the last Wattasid ruler.

Ali Abu Hassun (Arabic: أبو حسون علي بن محمد الشيخ الوطاسي), also Abu al Hasan Abu Hasun or Abu Hasun, full name Abu al-Hasan Abu Hasun Ali ibn Muhammad (died September 1554), was a regent of the Crown from the Wattasid dynasty during the 16th century.

== Life ==
In 1545, he succeeded Sultan Ahmad, who had been taken prisoner by his southern rivals the Saadians. Ali Abu Hassun became regent for Ahmad's young son Nasir al-Qasiri. Upon his accession, he pledged allegiance to the Ottoman Empire to obtain its support.

Ahmad came back after two years, and was able to rule from 1547 until 1549 when Fez and then Tlemcen were conquered by his southern Saadian rivals under Mohammed ash-Sheikh. Sultan Ahmad died that year, and Ali Abu Hassun again became regent, but since his country was occupied by the Saadians, he was offered asylum in Ottoman Algiers.

He implored the Christian states for help in regaining his state and as a result obtained support from John III of Portugal. He was to be protected and transported by a fleet of 5 Portuguese caravels which was intercepted and defeated in the Battle of Velez. Abu Hassun was captured and held in strict captivity in Algiers before offering his vassalage to Salah Reis. Ali Abu Hassun was able with the help of the Ottomans under Salah Rais to reconquer Fez in 1554, and was put in place as Sultan of Fez, supported by janissaries. Ali Abu Hassun paid off the Turkish troops and gave them the base of Peñon de Velez, which the Moroccans had reconquered in 1522 and was later seized by Salah Reis.

Abu Hassun was supported by the Qadariyya Sufi order, his Saadian enemies were supported by the Shadhiliyya Sufi order. The Jazoulite Sufi brotherhoods and the followers of Sidi Ahmed Ben Youssef, repressed by the Saadi ruler, were too ready to support the Wattasid ruler Abu Hassun.

The reconquest of Fes was short-lived however. Ali Abu Hassun was vanquished and killed by the Saadians at the Battle of Tadla in September 1554. Mohammed ash-Sheik was able to recapture the city of Fez and became the undisputed ruler of Morocco, establishing the Saadian dynasty as the sole ruler of the country. He then started negotiations with Spain to oust the Ottomans.
