= Johann Major =

German poet and theologian

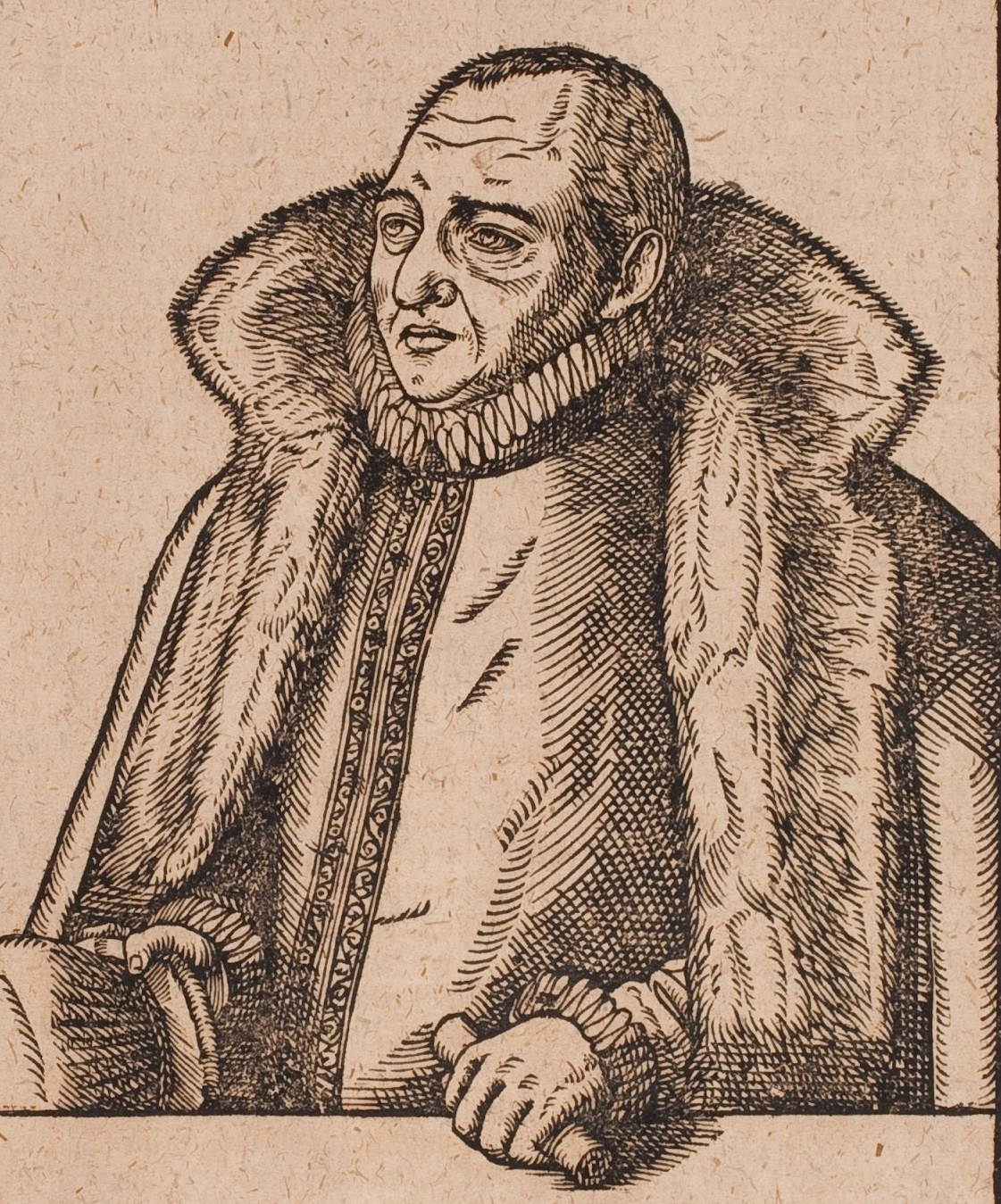
Johann Major by Lucas Cranach

Johann Major (2 January 1533 – 6 March 1600) was a German Protestant theologian, humanist and poet.

== Life ==
Major was born in Sankt Joachimsthal in the Kingdom of Bohemia. He matriculated in 1549 at the University of Wittenberg, and died in Zerbst.
