= Abu al-Abbas Ahmad ibn Muhammad =

16th-century Wattasid ruler

Abu al-Abbas Ahmad
- أحمد بن محمد بن محمد الوطاسي

Sultan of Morocco
- 2nd reign: 1547 – 1549
- Predecessor: Nasir al-Qasri
- Successor: Ali Abu Hassun (regent of the crown)
- 1st reign: 1526 – 1545
- Predecessor: Abu Abd Allah al-Burtuqali Muhammad ibn Muhammad
- Successor: Nasir al-Qasri
- Died: 1549
- Spouse: Sayyida al Hurra
- Issue: Nasir al-Qasiri; Lalla Halou
Names
- Aḥmad ibn Muḥammad al-Wattāsi
- Dynasty: Banū Wattās
- Father: Abu Abd Allah al-Burtuqali Muhammad ibn Muhammad

Abu al-Abbas Ahmad ibn Muhammad (Arabic: أبو العباس أحمد بن محمد), also Sultan Ahmad, or Ahmad al-Wattasi, was a Wattasid Sultan. He ruled from 1526 to 1545, and again between 1547 and 1549.

== Life ==
In 1532, Ahmad ibn Muhammad sent a letter to Francis I of France through trader Hémon de Molon, encouraging the French king to develop trade relations. In 1533, Francis I of France sent as ambassador to Ahmad ibn Muhammad, in the person of colonel Pierre de Piton. The embassy was made up of five gentlemen and the pseudo-merchant Aymond de Molon were part of the expedition: the embassy carried watches, mirrors, combs and other "merceryes" with some falconry items; everything was to be offered to Ahmed ibn Muhammad, the King of Fez, and to his vizier and brother-in-law Moulay Ibrahim ben Ali ibn Rashid al-Alami. The embassy landed at Larache and was conducted to the king's mahalla, which was in the vicinity; the ambassador handed over the presents, which were little tasted, then he accompanied the king to Fez, staying a month there.

Following this embassy, in a letter to Francis I dated 13 August 1533, Ahmad ibn Muhammad welcomed French overtures and granted freedom of shipping and protection of French traders. His foreign policyat that time was designed to counter the fast-growing powers of Spain and Portugal who held fortress enclaves on Moroccan soil.

Ahmad ibn Muhammad married Sayyida al Hurra in 1541.

In 1545, Ahmad ibn Muhammad was taken prisoner by his southern rivals the Saadians. His successor, Ali Abu Hassun, regent for Ahmad's young son Nasir al-Qasiri, decided to pledge allegiance to the Ottomans in order to obtain their support.

France started to send ships to Morocco in 1555, under the rule of Henry II, son of Francis I.

== Notes ==
Preceded by Abu Abdallah Muhammad	Wattasid dynasty 1525–1545	Succeeded by Nasir ad-Din al-Qasri Muhammad ibn Ahmad
Preceded by Nasir ad-Din al-Qasri Muhammad ibn Ahmad	Wattasid dynasty 1547–1549	Succeeded by Abu al-Hasan Abu Hasun Ali ibn Muhammad
