= Campaign of Azrou and Sefrou (1811-1812) =

Date	1811–1812
Location	Azrou, Sefrou
Result	Zayanes and allied tribes Victory
Territorial changes	Sack of Fez and Meknes

Belligerents
Zayanes; Ait myyil (Beni Mguild); Gerouan	(Morocco) Makhzen forces Zemmour; Aït Yemmour

Commanders and leaders
Abu Bakr Amhaouch	Slimane of Morocco

Strength
Unknown	Unknown

Casualties and losses
Unknown	Heavy

The Azrou and Sefrou campaign took place in April 1811, beginning with the battle of Azrou in 1811 and ending in 1812 with the battle of Sefrou. It opposed the Berber forces of the Zayanes and the Beni Mguild, accompanied by the Gerouanes, who had originally been in the enemy camp but betrayed them, against the Zemmour and the Aït Yemmou, who called for assistance from the Makhzen. In the end, the campaign resulted in a victory for the troops of Abu Bakr Amhouch and the sack of Meknes and Fes.

== Background ==
The Sultan of Morocco had to face an epidemic and a revolt by his brothers Moulay Hicham and Moulay Al Houssein. He suppressed the revolt in 1807 following an expedition to Tazerwalt and Guelmim, and also had to deal with numerous sieges against the Spanish Empire. It was in this context that this campaign took place.

== Campaign ==
In 1811, after defeating the Aït Yemmou and the Zemmour for the first time, Abu Bakr Amhouch, commander of the tribes of the Beni Mguild and the Zayanes, found himself forced to confront the forces of the Sultan of Morocco, who had been called for help by the defeated tribes. Despite being opposed by a superior force, the Berber tribes succeeded in plundering Fez and Meknes.
