= Timotheus Kirchner =

German Lutheran theologian

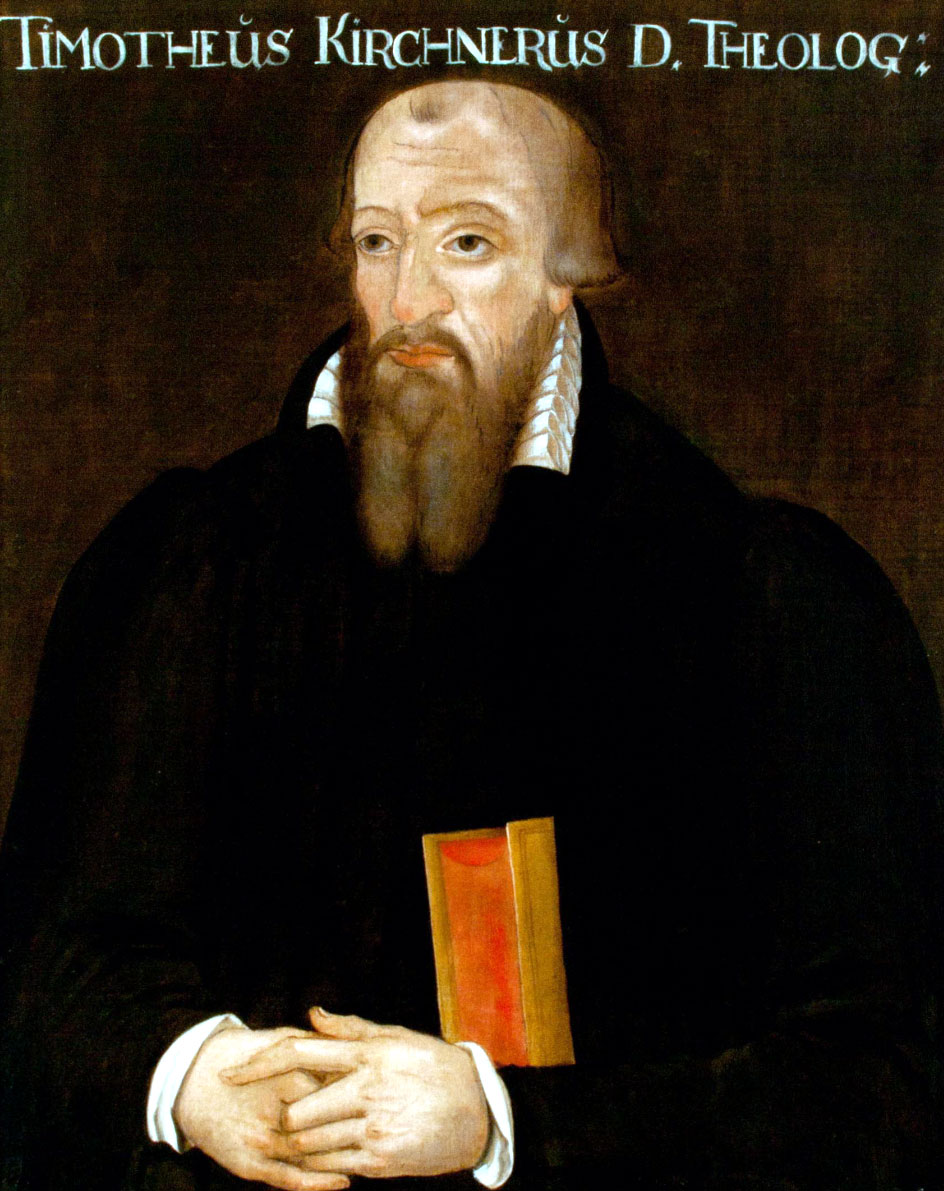
Kirchner, c. 1570

Timotheus Kirchner (6 January 1533 in Döllstädt – 14 September 1587 in Weimar) was a Lutheran theologian, pastor, Protestant reformer, professor of theology and superintendent in Weimar.

== Life ==
Kirchner was the son of a teacher. He attended school in Gotha, studied in Jena and Erfurt, and was the village priest at a young age.
