= Battle of Zayan =

1818 conflict near El Kbab, Morocco

Date	1818
Location	Lenda, not far from El Kbab, Morocco
Result	Berber coalition victory

Belligerents
(Morocco) Makhzen forces	Aït Oumalou; Marmoucha; Ait Seghrouchen; Aït sidi Ali; Zemmour; Aït Youssi; Ait myyil (Beni Mguild ) Aït Atta

Commanders and leaders
Slimane of Morocco (POW)	Abu Bakr Amhaouch

Strength
60,000 soldiers	Unknown

Casualties and losses
Heavy	Unknown

The Battle of Zayan took place in 1818 at Lenda, near El Kbab It opposed a pan-Berber coalition composed of the Aït Oumalou, who were part of the Sanhaja confederation, as well as the Marmoucha and the Aït Seghrouchen, who belonged to the Zenata, against an army of 60,000 soldiers led by Slimane of Morocco, Sultan of Morocco and ruler of the Alaouite Dynasty. The battle ended in a decisive victory for the Berber coalition and resulted in the capture of the Moroccan sultan.

== Background ==
The sultan of Morocco had pledged allegiance to the Wahhabi movement, which had established itself in the Maghreb in the 18th century, and opposed the existence of multiple independent tribes within his state. As a result, in 1811–1812, he decided to launch a first expedition against the Aït Oumalou, which ended in a defeat for the Moroccan army.

== Battle ==
The battle was fought against all the Arabs of Morocco; the insurgents, gathered around the leader Abu Bakr Amhaouch, completely crushed the army of the Sultan of Morocco and put it to rout.

== Aftermath ==
After the battle, the sultan's son, Moulay Brahim, was killed and the sultan was captured. He was released after being tortured for four days. The leader of the insurgents, Abu Bakr Amhouch, became the effective ruler of the mountains of the Atlas, Amhaoush and his forces then besieged the city of Meknes and Moulay Slimane was obliged to negotiate a truce with the mediation of the shaikh of the zawiya Sidi Hamza, Abu Mu-hammad Abdul ben Hamza, and in 1820 he conquered the city of Fés.
