= Tagmadert =

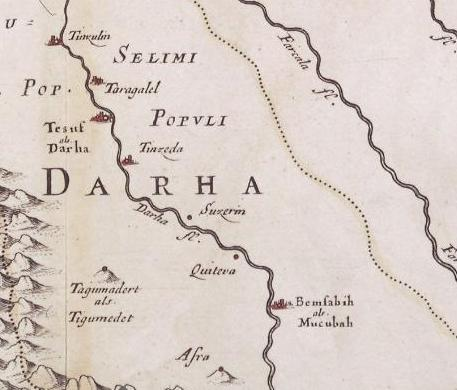
Detail of map by Nicolas Sanson (1600-1667). Estats et royaumes de Fez et Maroc, Dahra et Segelmesse tirés de Sanuto, de Marmol.

Tagmadert (also Tagumadert, Tagmad(d)art, Tigumedet) is a city in the Draa River valley in Morocco. The name seems to have referred to both a district and a town.

The town Tagmadert was founded in 1550 by Mohammed ash-Sheikh. It was probably destroyed during the reign of Moulay Slimane (1792–1822), possibly like Sijilmassa in 1818 by Aït Atta Berber tribes. The present village of Amezrou may have been built on its ruins. A sequia (irrigation canal) called Tagmadert still exists today in that place.

== See also ==
- Draa River valley
- Saadi dynasty
- Abu Abdallah al-Qaim
- Mohammed ash-Sheikh
