= Abu Abd Allah al-Burtuqali Muhammad ibn Muhammad =

Wattasid ruler from 1504 to 1526

Muhammad al-Burtuqali or Muhammad al-Bortogali
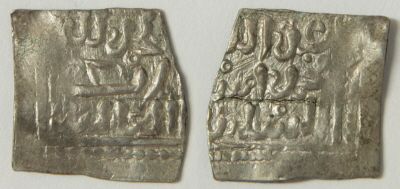
- Silver coins minted during the reign of Muhammad al-Burtuqali
- Reign: 1504–1526
- Predecessor: Abu Abd Allah al-Sheikh Muhammad ibn Yahya
- Successor: Abu al-Abbas Ahmad ibn Muhammad
- Born: 1464; Fez
- Died: 1526 (aged 62)
- Dynasty: Wattasid
- Father: Abu Abd Allah al-Sheikh Muhammad ibn Yahya
- Religion: Sunni Islam

Muhammad al-Burtuqali, (full name Abu Abd Allah al-Burtuqali Muhammad ibn Muhammad, Arabic : أبو عبد الله محمد البرتقالي) succeeded his father Abu Abd Allah al-Sheikh Muhammad ibn Yahya to become the second Wattasid Sultan in 1504. He died in 1526 and was succeeded by his son Abu al-Abbas Ahmad ibn Muhammad.

As a child, Muhammad al-Burtuqali earned the nickname of Al-Bortogali after being held as a hostage for seven years by the Portuguese.

Sultan Muhammad al-Burtughali was the sultan that sent Leo Africanus and his uncle on a mission to Timbuktu. This journey gave Leo Africanus material for the Description of Africa.

Preceded by Abu Abd Allah al-Sheikh Muhammad ibn Yahya	Wattasid dynasty 1504–1525	Succeeded by Abu al-Abbas Ahmad ibn Muhammad
