= Abraham ben Solomon =

16th-century Spanish historian

Abraham ben Solomon (born 1482) of Torrutiel (Utiel, Valencia) was a Spanish Jewish historian of the early 16th century. His major work Sefer ha-Qabbalah is a continuation of Abraham ibn Daud completed in 1510 covering the events of 1492. He was expelled from Spain and settled in Fez, Morocco.
