= Wattasid dynasty =

1472–1554 Berber dynasty ruling Morocco

Wattasid dynasty الوطاسيون
- 1472–1554
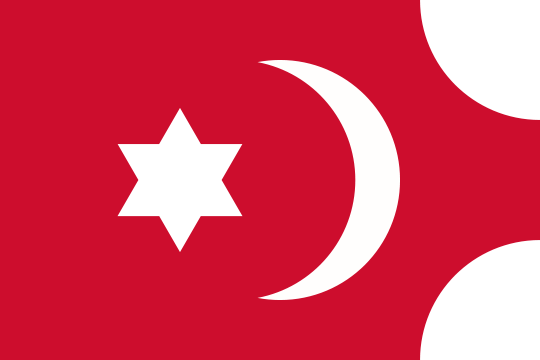
- Flag

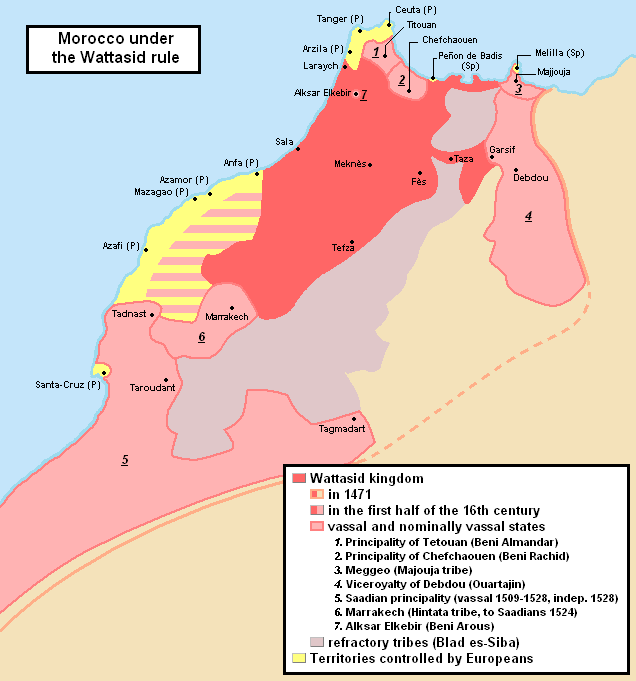
- Map of the Wattasid sultanate (dark red) and its vassal states (light red)
- Status: Ruling dynasty of Morocco
- Capital: Fez
- Common languages: Berber languages Arabic
- Religion: Sunni Islam
- Government: Monarchy
- Sultan
  - 1472-1504: Abu Abd Allah al-Sheikh Muhammad ibn Yahya
  - 1545-1547: Nasir al-Qasri
- History
  - Established: 1472
  - Battle of Tadla: 1554
- Currency: Dirham
Preceded by	Succeeded by
Marinid dynasty	Saadi Sultanate

The Wattasid dynasty (Arabic: الوطاسيون, al-waṭṭāsīyūn) was a ruling dynasty of Morocco. Like the Marinid dynasty, its rulers were of Zenata Berber descent. The two families were related, and the Marinids recruited many viziers from the Wattasids. These viziers gradually assumed many of the powers of the sultans. In 1458 or 1459, Abd al-Haqq II reasserted direct Marinid authority and suppressed the Wattasid family, reportedly killing many of its members. In 1465, Abd al-Haqq was killed during a revolt in Fez, after which the Wattasids eventually established control over the former Marinid realm.

Abu Abd Allah al-Sheikh Muhammad ibn Yahya was the first Sultan of the Wattasid Dynasty. He controlled only the northern part of Morocco, the south being divided into several principalities. The Wattasids were finally supplanted in 1554, after the Battle of Tadla, by the Saadi dynasty princes of Tagmadert who had ruled all of southern Morocco since 1511.

== Overview ==
Morocco endured a prolonged multifaceted crisis in the 15th and early 16th centuries brought about by economic, political, social and cultural issues. Population growth remained stagnant and traditional commerce with the far south was cut off as the Portuguese occupied all seaports. At the same time, the towns were impoverished, and intellectual life was on the decline.

== History ==
Morocco was in decline when the Berber Wattasids assumed power. The Wattasid family had been the autonomous governors of the eastern Rif since the late 13th century, ruling from their base in Tazouta (near present-day Nador). They had close ties to the Marinid sultans and provided many of the bureaucratic elite. While the Marinid dynasty tried to repel the Portuguese and Spanish invasions and help the kingdom of Granada to outlive the Reconquista, the Wattasids accumulated absolute power through political maneuvering. When the Marinids became aware of the extent of the conspiracy, they slaughtered the Wattasids, leaving only Abu Abd Allah al-Sheikh Muhammad ibn Yahya alive. He went on to found the Kingdom of Fez and establish the dynasty to be succeeded by his son, Mohammed al-Burtuqali, in 1504.

The Wattasid rulers failed in their promise to protect Morocco from foreign incursions and the Portuguese increased their presence on Morocco's coast. Mohammad al-Chaykh's son attempted to capture Asilah and Tangier in 1508, 1511 and 1515, but without success.

In the south, a new dynasty arose, the Saadian dynasty, which seized Marrakesh in 1524 and made it their capital. By 1537 the Saadis were in the ascendent when they defeated the Portuguese Empire at Agadir. Their military successes contrast with the Wattasid policy of conciliation towards the Catholic kings to the north.

As a result, the people of Morocco tended to regard the Saadians as heroes, making it easier for them to retake the Portuguese strongholds on the coast, including Tangiers, Ceuta and Maziɣen. The Saadians also attacked the Wattasids who were forced to yield to the new power. In 1554, as Wattasid towns surrendered, the Wattasid sultan, Ali Abu Hassun, briefly retook Fez. The Saadis quickly settled the matter by killing him and, as the last Wattasids fled Morocco by ship, they too were murdered by pirates.

The Wattasid did little to improve general conditions in Morocco following the Reconquista. It was necessary to wait for the Saadians for order to be reestablished and the expansionist ambitions of the kingdoms of the Iberian peninsula to be curbed.

== Coinage ==
Known Wattasid coins include a few extremely rare gold coins and also square silver dirhams and half dirhams, still following the Almohad Caliphate standard of roughly 1.5 grams.

== The dynasty ==
=== Viziers of Marinid Sultanate ===
1. Abu Zakariya Yahya ibn Ziyan al-Wattasi, 1420–1448
2. Ali ibn Yusuf, 1448–1458
3. Yahya ibn Yahya, 1458–1459

=== Sultans of Wattasid Sultanate ===
1. Abu Abd Allah Muhammad al-Sheikh, son of Yahya, 1472–1504
2. Abu Abd Allah Muhammad al-Burtuqali, son of al-Sheikh, 1504–1526
3. Abu al-Abbas Ahmad, son of al-Burtuqali, 1526–1545, 1547–1549
4. Nasir ad-Din Muhammad al-Qasri, son of Ahmad, 1545–1547
5. Abu al-Hasan Abu Hassun Ali, son of Nasir ad-Din, 1549–1554

=== Family tree ===
Family tree of the Wattasid dynasty
Viziers
Sultans

Ziyan
Yahya al-Wattasi r. 1420–1448	Ali ibn Yusuf r. 1448–1458
Yahya r. 1458–1459
Muhammad al-Sheikh r. 1472–1504
Muhammad al-Burtuqali r. 1504–1526
Ahmad r. 1526–1545, 47–49	Ali r. 1549–1554
Nasir al-Din al-Qasri r. 1545–1547

== Chronology of events ==
- According to the Treaty of Alcáçovas (1479), and to the Treaty of Tordesillas (1494), Spain recognizes the kingdom as being in the Portuguese sphere of influence.
- 1485: Treaty with Spain; The sultanate agrees to not help the Emirate of Granada, and in return, Spain agrees to not capture Moroccan ships in the Alboran Sea.
- 1488: Portuguese conquer Safi.
- 1491: Muhammad XII, the sultan of Granada flees to Fez, but is captured and blinded.
- 1492: Fall of Granada to Spain. Arrival of Spanish Muslims and Jews to Morocco.
- 1497: Spain captures Melilla
- 1502: Portugal captures Mazagan.
- 1505: Portugal captures Agadir.
- 1506: Portugal captures Mogador.
- 1511: Saadians capture Rabat.
- 1524: Saadians capture Marrakesh.
- 1541: Saadians capture Agadir.
- 1541: Saadians capture Safi.
- 1542: Hasan Hasim captures Tetuan.
- 1548: The last Wattasid king is captured by the Saadians.
- 1550: Saadians conquer Fez.

== See also ==
- List of rulers of Morocco
- Sayyida al Hurra

== Sources ==
- Brancato, Dario (2014). "'Leo Africanus' and His Worlds of Translation". In Federici, F.; Tessicini, D. (eds.). Translators, Interpreters, and Cultural Negotiators: Mediating and Communicating Power from the Middle Ages to the Modern Era. Palgrave Macmillan.
- Bosworth, C.E. (1996). The New Islamic Dynasties. Columbia University Press.
