= Chabab =

Chabab may refer to:

- Chabab Riadhi Belouizdad, Algerian football club
- Chabab Al Araich, Moroccan football club currently playing in the third division
- Chabab Atlas Khénifra, Moroccan football club currently playing in the third division
- Chabab Houara, Moroccan football club currently playing in the second division
- Chabab Rif Hoceima, Moroccan football club based in Al Hoceima
- Chabab Massira, Moroccan football club based in Laayoune (Capital of the Western Sahara)
- Chabab Mohammédia, Moroccan football club currently playing in the First division, founded in 1948
- Mohammed Chabab, Moroccan composer and pianist
