= Spanish cruiser Cataluña =

Spanish armored cruiser of 1908–1928

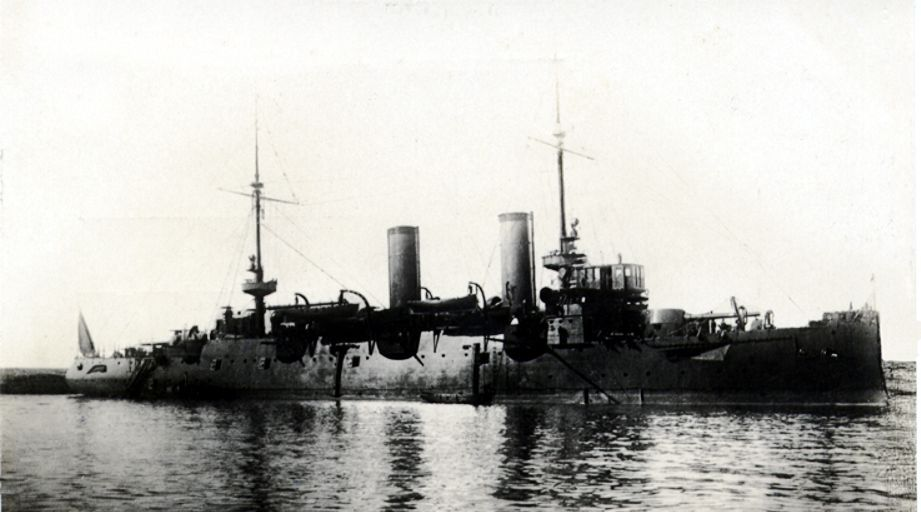
- Cataluña in 1914.

History

Spain
- Name: Cataluña
- Namesake: Catalonia
- Operator: Spanish Navy
- Ordered: 17 September 1888
- Builder: Arsenal de Cartagena, Cartagena, Spain
- Cost: 14,000,000 pesetas
- Laid down: 23 January 1890
- Launched: 24 September 1900
- Completed: 7 April 1908
- Commissioned: 7 April 1908
- Decommissioned: 12 November 1928
- Stricken: 1930
- Fate: Sold 1930; Scrapped

General characteristics
- Type: Armoured cruiser
- Displacement: 6,888 tons
- Length: 110.97 m (364 ft 1 in)
- Beam: 18.59 m (61 ft 0 in)
- Draught: 6.61 m (21 ft 8 in)
- Propulsion: Steam engines, 14,800 hp (11,036 kW), two shafts
- Speed: 20 knots (37 km/h; 23 mph)
- Complement: 542
- Armament: 2 × 9.4 in (24 cm) (2 × 1); 8 × 5.5 in (14 cm) (8 × 1); 8 × 57 mm (2.2 in)/42
- Armour: 11.88 in (30.2 cm) belt; 7.88 in (20.0 cm) barbette; 7.88 in (20.0 cm) conning tower; 3.88 in (9.9 cm) turret; 2.25 in (5.7 cm) deck

Cataluña was a Spanish Navy Princesa de Asturias-class armored cruiser in commission from 1908 to 1928. She fought in the Rif War of 1921–1926.

Cataluña was named for Catalonia, a region of Spain.

== Characteristics ==
Cataluña was 110.97 metres (364 ft 1 in) long and had a beam of 18.59 metres (61 ft 0 in), a draft of 6.61 metres (21 ft 8 in), and a displacement of 6,888 tons. She had reciprocating steam engines rated at 14,800 indicated horsepower (11,036 kW) driving two shafts, giving her a top speed of 20 knots (37 km/h; 23 mph). Her main armament consisted of two 9.4-inch (239 mm) guns mounted in single turrets. Her secondary armament consisted of eight 5.5-inch (140 mm) guns on single mounts.

The Princesa de Asturias-class ships in essence were modernized Infanta Maria Teresa-class cruisers with more modern and better-balanced armament, but like the Infanta Maria Teresa-class ships their armour coverage was not comprehensive, and the ships were poorly armoured by the standards of their time. Cataluña had belt armour of 11.88 inches (30.2 cm), conning tower and barbette armour of 7.88 inches (20.0 cm), 3.88-inch (9.9 cm) turret armour, and 2.25-inch (5.7 cm) deck armour.

== Construction and commissioning ==
Cataluña′s construction was authorized by a royal decree of 17 September 1888. She was laid down at the Arsenal de Cartagena at Cartagena, Spain, on 23 January 1890 and was launched on 24 September 1900. While fitting out, she conducted several wireless telegraphy tests with her sister ship Princesa de Asturias off Cartagena in late April 1907. She was delivered to the Spanish Navy on 7 April 1908. Her total construction cost was 14,000,000 pesetas.

== Service history ==
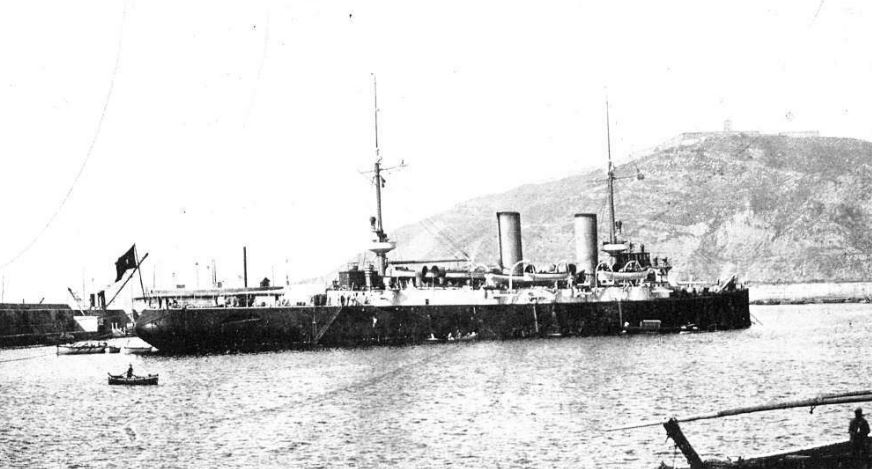
Cataluña at Barcelona in 1908.

Cataluña departed Cartagena on 9 April 1908 bound for Barcelona. While at Barcelona she received her battle ensign, presented to her by the ladies of Barcelona in a ceremony attended by King Alfonso XIII and Queen Victoria Eugenie as well as the French Navy battleships Démocratie and Patrie. She got underway from Barcelona in early May 1908 and proceeded to Palma de Mallorca on Mallorca in the Balearic Islands. While there, she brought aboard commemorative relics and historical artifacts related to King Jaime III of Mallorca and subsequently transported them to Valencia in a high-profile ceremonial voyage. She then returned to Cartagena to coal.

Due to unrest in Morocco, Cataluña subsequently headed from Cartagena to the coast of North Africa to anchor at Larache, where several of the incidents had occurred. She later moved to Tétouan, where she rendezvoused with Princesa de Asturias. She anchored alone at Larache again before Princesa de Asturias replaced her there in late August 1908.

In October 1908, Cataluña and the destroyer Audaz made a voyage from Cádiz to Barcelona, which they reached on 17 October. Princesa de Asturias and the armored cruiser Emperador Carlos V joined them on 18 October, also arriving from Cádiz. On 21 October 1908, a French squadron arrived, and the Spanish and French ships remained at Barcelona during the visit there of King Alfonso XIII and Queen Victoria Eugenie. The Spanish ships departed Barcelona on 8 November 1908, Cataluña proceeding to Alicante for a several-day visit while the rest headed for Cartagena.

On 17 January 1909, Cataluña arrived at Gioia Tauro in the Kingdom of Italy with supplies for the relief of victims of the 28 December 1908 earthquake in Messina, Sicily. A few days later she arrived at Milazzo, Sicily, and embarked a large number of injured people destined for the Santa Marta Hospice in Vatican City. She arrived at Naples on 31 January with 23 injured people and 180 orphaned children aboard and reached Civitavecchia on the morning of 1 February 1909.

When King Alfonso XIII visited Melilla on the coast of North Africa on 8 January 1911, Cataluña was part of the Spanish Navy squadron charged with escorting his royal yacht, Giralda. By the end of May 1911, Spanish concern over French moves in Tunisia so alarmed the Spanish government that Spain decided to occupy Larache to preempt any possible French move into the Spanish sphere of influence in Morocco. On 3 June 1911, the 1st and 2nd Companies of the 1st Battalion of the 1st Regiment boarded the troopship Almirante Lobo and the 3rd Company boarded Cataluña at San Fernando, Spain. They got underway in the afternoon, and on the morning of 4 June they anchored six cables — 0.6 nautical miles (1.1 km; 0.7 mi) — from the Larache bar at the mouth of the Loukkos River. Shortly afterwards, the Moroccan medical barge arrived alongside Cataluña with a doctor on board, and the Moroccans, when Cataluña′s crew asked them, expressed a strong desire for the marines to disembark. During the afternoon of 4 June, the Spanish consul and the captain in charge of the indigenous police boarded Cataluña, who consulted with the commander of the Spanish expedition. The marines remained aboard the ships, awaiting developments and further instructions, before finally disembarking during the night of 7–8 June along with Cataluña′s artillery section. The landing was peaceful, and the local population greeted the Spaniards warmly. However, most of the Marines and Cataluña′s artillery section quickly moved to Ksar el-Kebir to defend that town against an anticipated assault by rebel Kabyles. In the end, the landing force faced no opposition and the Spaniards completed the occupation without fighting.

King Alfonso XIII and Queen Victoria Eugenie attended a naval parade in Santander on 12 July 1912 in which sailors and marine infantrymen from Cataluña, Emperador Carlos V, and Princesa de Asturias participated. On 20 September 1912 Cataluña departed Ferrol and proceeded to Cádiz with the Training Squadron. She conducted gunnery exercises off Torre García between 13 and 16 March 1913, making port at Cádiz when they concluded. With other ships of the Training Squadron, she steamed from Cádiz to Ferrol in early May 1913 to attend the launching of the battleship Alfonso XIII, which took place on 7 May.

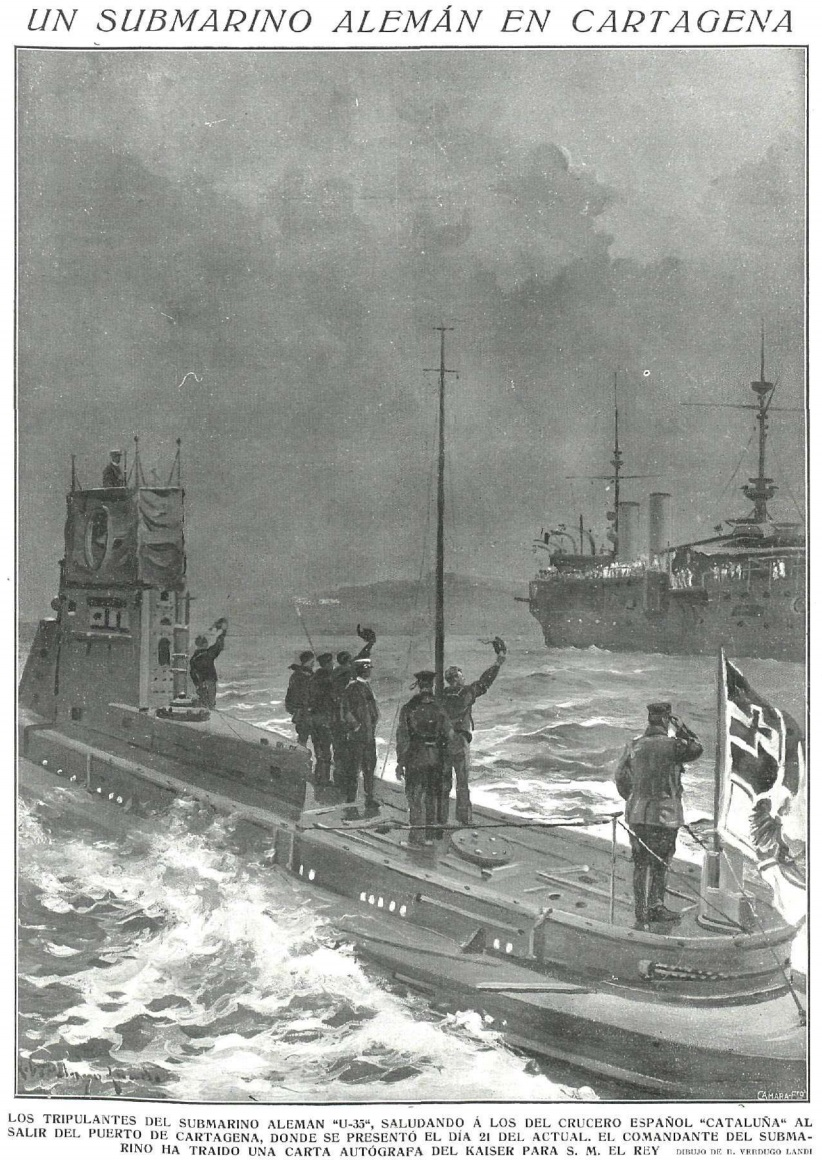
The crew of the Imperial German Navy submarine U-35 salutes Cataluña while departing Cartagena on 22 June 1916. (Illustration in La Esfera, 1 July 1916)

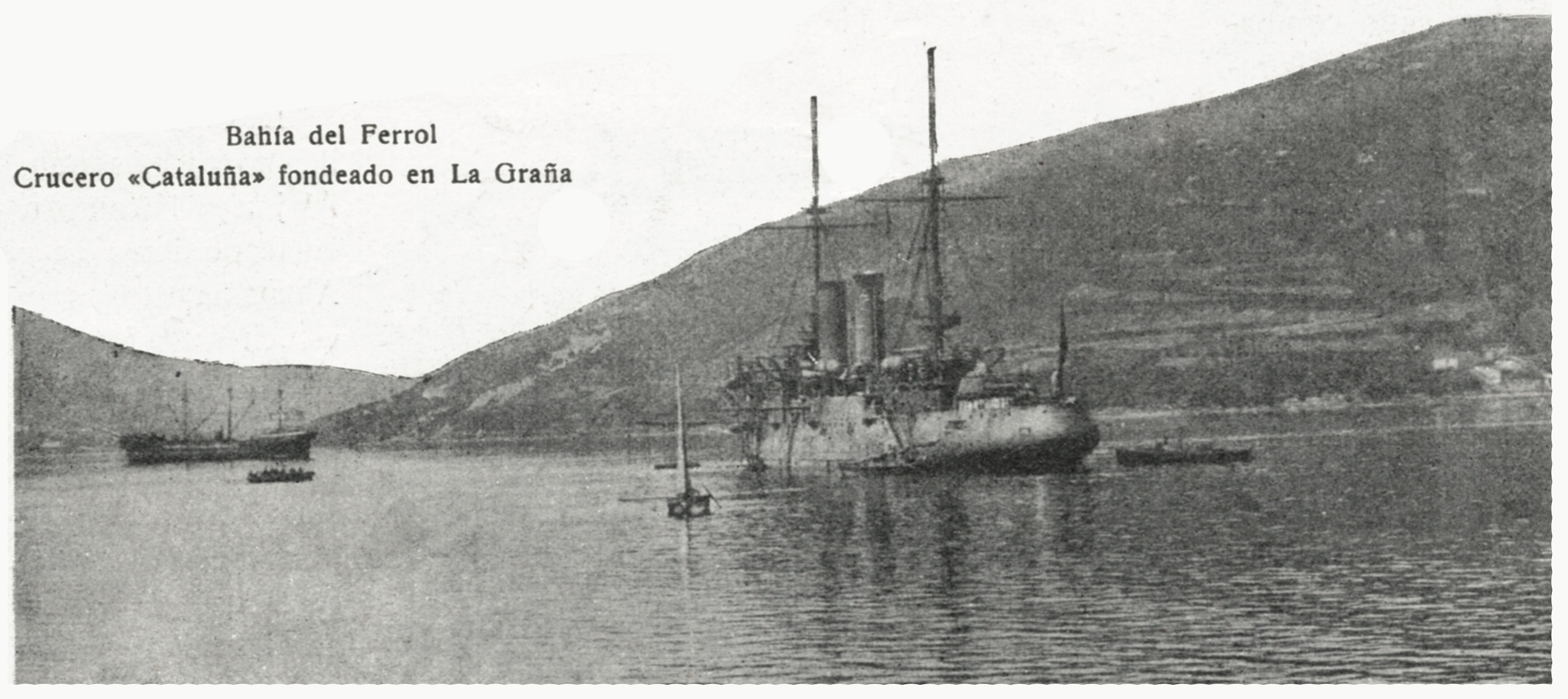
Cataluña in the Ferrol estuary. (Ibérica, 7 April 1917)

World War I broke out in late July 1914, and Spain remained neutral. On 2 October 1914, the Training Squadron, including Cataluña, gathered at Cartagena for the visit of the President of France, Raymond Poincaré, after which part of the squadron headed for the coast of Africa. At around 17:00 on 20 November 1914, Cataluña left La Palma in the Canary Islands escorting the German merchant ship Macedonia — which had had a part of its propulsion machinery replaced — to Las Palmas to prevent the British auxiliary cruiser HMS Victorian from capturing Macedonia in international waters. From 21 to 22 June 1916, the Imperial German Navy submarine U-35 anchored off Cataluña′s port side at Cartagena while delivering a message from the Emperor of Germany, Wilhelm II, to King Alfonso XIII. The war concluded in November 1918.

Cataluña visited Bizerte in French Tunisia in the spring of 1921, where she received a salute from the interned ships of Wrangel's fleet, the ships of the former Imperial Russian Navy's Black Sea Fleet which had fought on the losing White side in the Russian Civil War and fled to internment at Bizerte.

Cataluña operated against Riffian forces in Spanish Morocco during the Rif War of 1921–1926. At midnight on 7 October 1922, Cataluña, Audaz, the destroyer Bustamante, the seaplane carrier Dédalo, the transports Mediterráneo and Santa Teresa , and two fishing boats got underway from Ceuta on the coast of North Africa bound for the M'Ter River, 5 nautical miles (9.3 km; 5.8 mi) east of Punta de Pescadores. At 05:00 on 8 October, the ships reached the river, where they rendezvoused with Coronel (Colonel) Alberto Castro Girona embarked aboard the gunboat Bonifaz. The ships then disembarked troops of the Spanish Foreign Legion and the Serrallo Regiment, engineers, pontoners (engineers specializing in the construction of floating platforms and temporary bridges for amphibious landings and river crossings), and others onto the beach. By midday, all of the troops had disembarked and taken the Riffian positions. The ships remained anchored off the landing beach overnight and during the next day. In 1924 Rifian forces at M'Ter fired at her off the M'Ter River, and as she returned fire a gun exploded on her deck, killing one of her officers.

After the patrol boat Larache — under Capitán de corbeta (Corvette Captain) Francisco Moreno Fernández, a future almirante (admiral) — encountered a strong storm in the Mediterranean on 18 November 1924 after departing Ceuta and reported dangerous flooding in hurricane-force winds and waves at least 9 metres (30 feet) in height, Cataluña and the battleship Alfonso XIII attempted to come to her assistance, but the severe weather prevented them from reaching her; nonetheless, Larache finally moored safely at Almería on 21 November after 76 hours in the storm. At the end of 1924 Cataluña entered dry dock at Matagorda, Spain, for careening.

Cataluña later served as a training ship and made several midshipman training voyages. The barquentine Juan Sebastián de Elcano was commissioned as the Spanish Navy's training ship in August 1928, replacing Cataluña, and Cataluña was decommissioned by a Royal Order of 12 November 1928.

== Final disposition ==
Cataluña was stricken from the naval register in 1930. She was sold at Bilbao in 1930 for scrapping.
