= Larache landing =

Spanish occupation of Larache in 1911

The Larache landing refers to the military action in 1911 that led to the occupation of the Moroccan city of Larache by the Spanish Marine Infantry, establishing a precedent for the military intervention in Morocco and the subsequent Rif War.

== Historical context ==
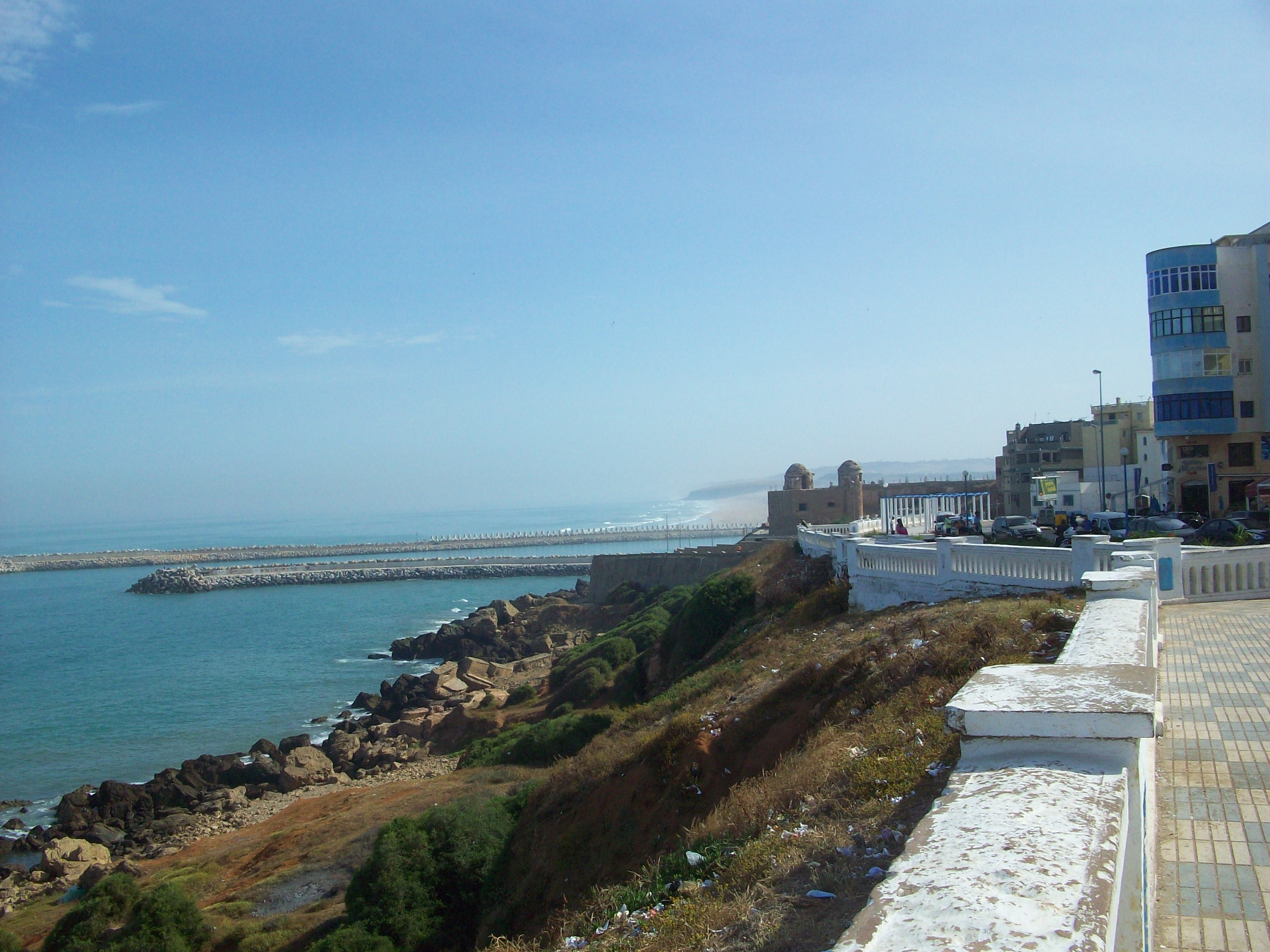
Area where the Spanish camp was set up, with the castle of San Antonio in the background.

The north-west of the Maghreb, where the Sultan of Morocco exercised his influence, was plunged into disorder and violence at the beginning of the 20th century. According to the British ambassador to Spain at the time, Arthur Nicholson, the existence of a country, a state and a Moroccan sultan with power beyond Tangier was a fiction, since the only thing there was a group of independent and warlike tribes and Kabyles.

In 1904, the power of the Sultan of Morocco was limited by the powers that looked after the interests of their nationals in the area. Thus, for any crime, foreign residents could only be tried by the courts of their country of origin, and according to their own legislation. They were generally exempt from paying taxes, and their indigenous employees had the status of "protected", enjoying the same legal status as their employers. When the Sultan dictated any measure that affected foreign residents, he had to have the agreement of the consulates of the nations concerned. On the other hand, the authority of Sultan Abdelaziz was undermined by the actions of sheriffs such as Bou Hmara in the eastern Rif or Raisuni - the leader of the mountains - and disputed by his own brother Abd al-Hafid, who would end up overthrowing his brother.

This circumstance was exploited by the colonial empires to extend their influence there by using it as a trump card in the balance of power, which led to the First Moroccan Crisis and the increase in tensions that would end with the outbreak of the First World War.

The crisis was temporarily resolved at the Algeciras Conference, where Germany prevented the Maghreb from falling under the sole influence of France, and an agreement was reached to exercise a protectorate in Morocco with two areas of influence, Spanish and French.

The French military intervention in response to the revolts against the Sultan forced the Spanish government to rush to take positions in the places of the Protectorate where Spain was to exert its influence and begin to develop the mining industry and trade in accordance with the Franco-Spanish pacts of 1904 and 1905 and the conditions of the Algeciras Conference. In the agreed zone of Spanish influence there were already settlements with a Spanish presence, and in the same zone of Larache there was an indigenous police tabor under the command of Captain Ovilo y Castelo. Spain and France were tasked with improving the administration of the sultanate, for which they had a police force, but they could not intervene militarily.

In this situation, José Canalejas y Méndez's Government intervened without delay in order to maintain its political and economic influence in the region. With this action, Sultan Abdelaziz saw an opportunity to nullify Mulai Ahmed er Raisuni's power, while the latter hoped that the Spanish intervention would favor his interests against the Sultan.

The agreements of the Algeciras Conference did not prevent the "Second Moroccan Crisis" or Agadir Crisis, which began with the French occupation of Fez on 21 May 1911, the Spanish military occupation of Larache, Asilah and Ksar el-Kebir a few weeks later, and was unleashed with the arrival of the German gunboat SMS Panther at the port of Agadir on 1 July.

== Development of operations ==
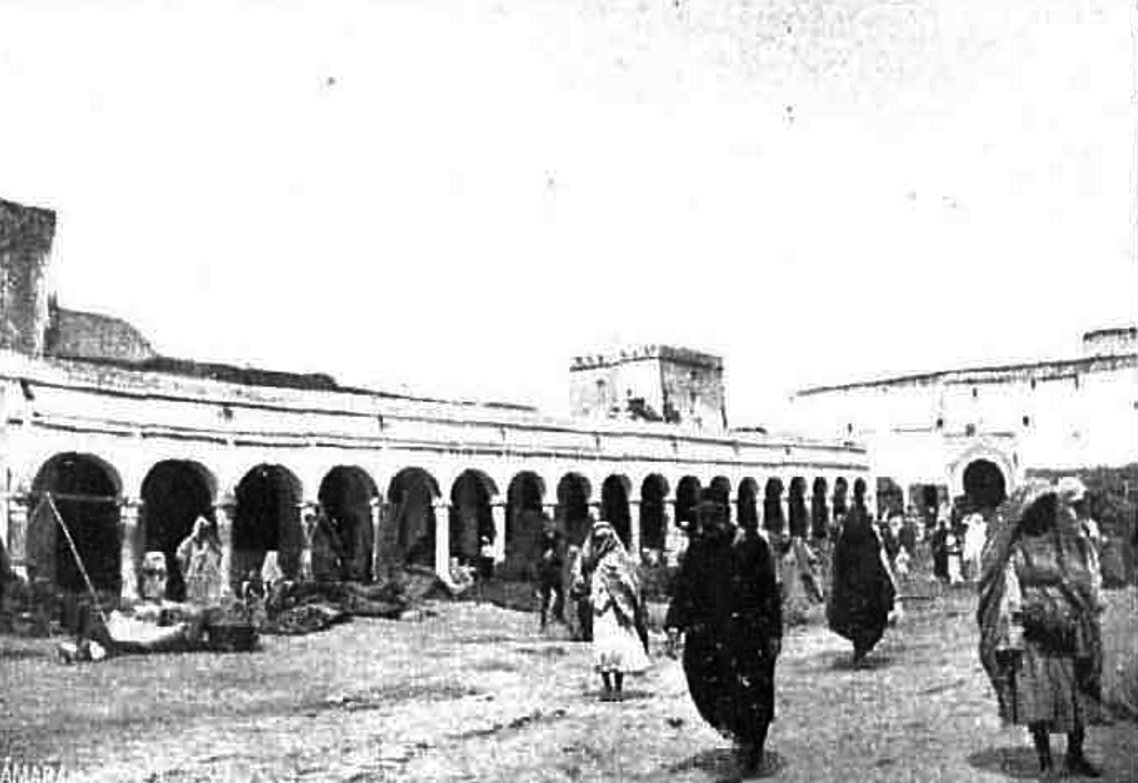
The Larache souk in 1911.

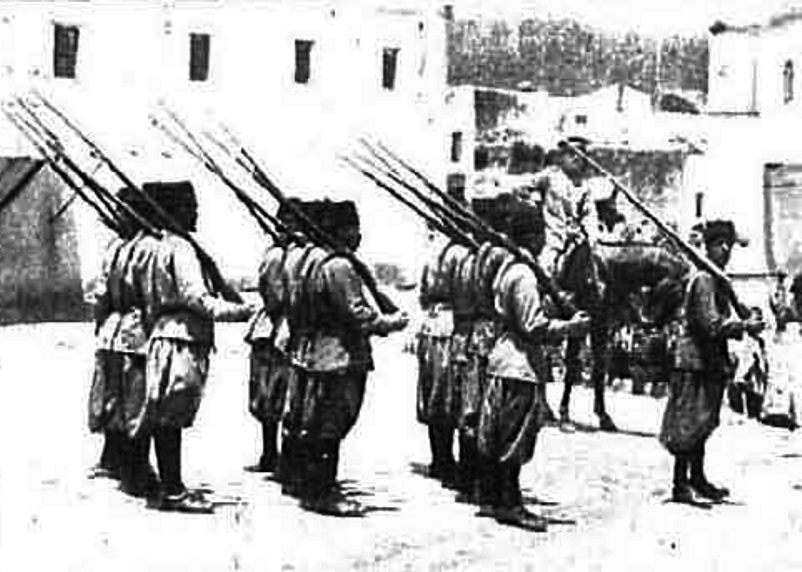
Indigenous police of the Tabor of Larache.

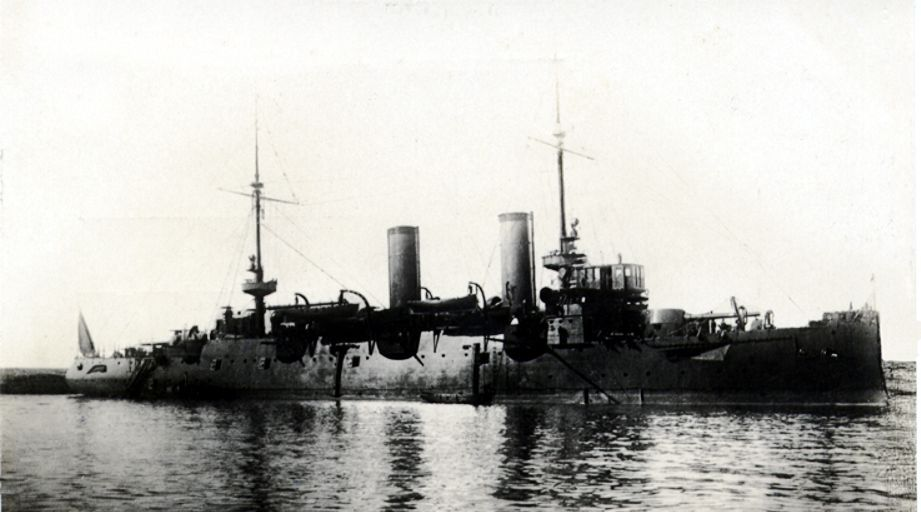
The armored cruiser Cataluña.

The increase in riots and disorders in 1911 led to a violent revolt in Fez, which led to the military occupation of the square by the French army, from where it began to spread to the Spanish zone of influence, which contravened what had been agreed in the Algeciras Conference. The French action in Tunisia aroused the indignation of Spanish public opinion, which saw it as a flagrant attack on the Algeciras agreements, which only provided for the presence of 2,500 indigenous police under the command of 20 Spanish and French officers in the eight ports open to free trade; it was suspected that France wanted to repeat what it had done in 1864 to take over Tunisia, which that time it had been "taken" from Italy. Canalejas warned that if France maintained the occupation, Spain would do the same in the strategic places under its influence, an area also heavily punished by the violence of some tribes. According to the Count of Romanones, there were agents of the highest authority who told him that they were convinced that if the Spanish response had been delayed only a few hours, those places would have ended up in French hands.

From the end of May, extraordinary activity was observed in various units of the Spanish Army and Navy, and at the beginning of June the 1st and 3rd Marine Infantry Regiments were concentrated in San Fernando, where they carried out landing manoeuvres. On the 3rd, the 1st and 2nd Companies of the 1st Battalion of the 1st Regiment boarded the troopship Almirante Lobo, and the 3rd Company boarded the armored cruiser Cataluña. They got underway in the afternoon, and on the morning of the 4th they anchored six cables — 0.6 nautical miles (1.1 km; 0.7 mi) — from the Larache bar, formed by the mouth of the Loukkos River on which the town is located. Shortly afterwards, the Moroccan medical barge arrived alongside Cataluña with a doctor on board. The Moroccans, asked by the crew of the Spanish cruiser, expressed a great desire for the contingent to disembark. In the afternoon, the Spanish consul and the captain in charge of the indigenous police boarded the cruiser, who dispatched with the head of the expedition.

The expedition remained expectant for three more days, awaiting developments and instructions from the consulate, until on the night of the 7th to the 8th, under a full moon, the marines disembarked together with the artillery section of Cataluña. The troops were well received by the people of Larache, who showed signs of affection and sympathy. The Spanish camped to the west of the square, on a plateau cut by cliffs that fall into the Atlantic, and immediately the majority of the contingent was sent, together with the artillery section of Cataluña, to Ksar el-Kebir, where an assault by the rebel Kabyles seemed imminent. The landing took place without any fighting or opposition.

The peaceful circumstances of the occupation were facilitated by the efforts of the Spanish consul Juan Zugasti with the leader Mulai Ahmed er Raisuni, sheriff of Jebala. In the following days more Spanish troops arrived in Larache and began to advance towards Ksar el-Kebir and Asilah: on the 12th, the 4th Company of the 1st Battalion of the Marine Infantry, the Vitoria Cavalry Regiment; on the 22nd, another battalion of the Marine Infantry...

The occupation of Larache and other places in the region (such as Chefchaouen or Ksar el-Kebir) was intended to stabilize the territory, which after the negotiations reached in the Treaty of Fes would finally become a Spanish protectorate. However, the situation in the area became more volatile, until it openly led to an armed conflict.
