= Mohamed Chrif Tribak =

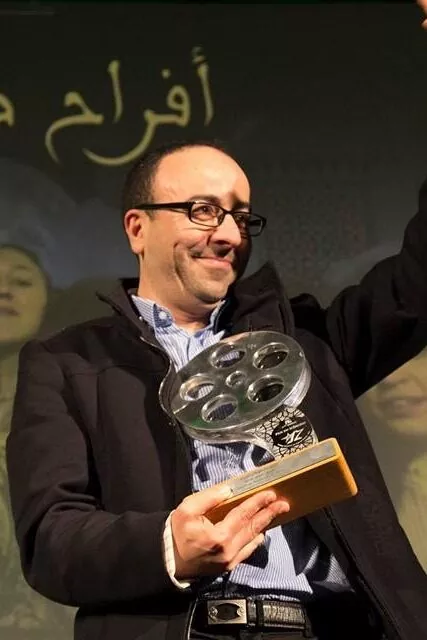
- Born: 1971 (age 54–55); Larache
- Citizenship: Morocco
- Occupations: Film director, Screenwriter, Director

Mohamed Chrif Tribak (Arabic: محمد الشريف الطريبق; born 1971 in Larache) is a Moroccan filmmaker and screenwriter.

== Career ==
Le temps des camarades, the director's first feature film, was screened at multiple film festivals and won a number of prizes, including the Ousman Samben grand prize at the 2009 Khouribgha African Film Festival and the Grand Prize at the Tangier National Film Festival.

== Filmography ==
=== Feature films and TV Films ===
- 2002: Horses Whinny Before Falling
- 2003: Taman al-Rahil
- 2004: Ghazal al-Wakt
- 2005: Bab El M'Dina
- 2008: Entre Parentheses
- 2008: Le temps des camarades
- 2015: Petits bonheurs
- 2024: Journal intime (Post Production)

=== Short films ===
- 1998: Nassima
- 2003: Balcon Atlantico
- 2005: L'Extraterrestre
- 2005: 30 Ans
- 2005: Mawal
