= Larache =

Larache العرائش
- City
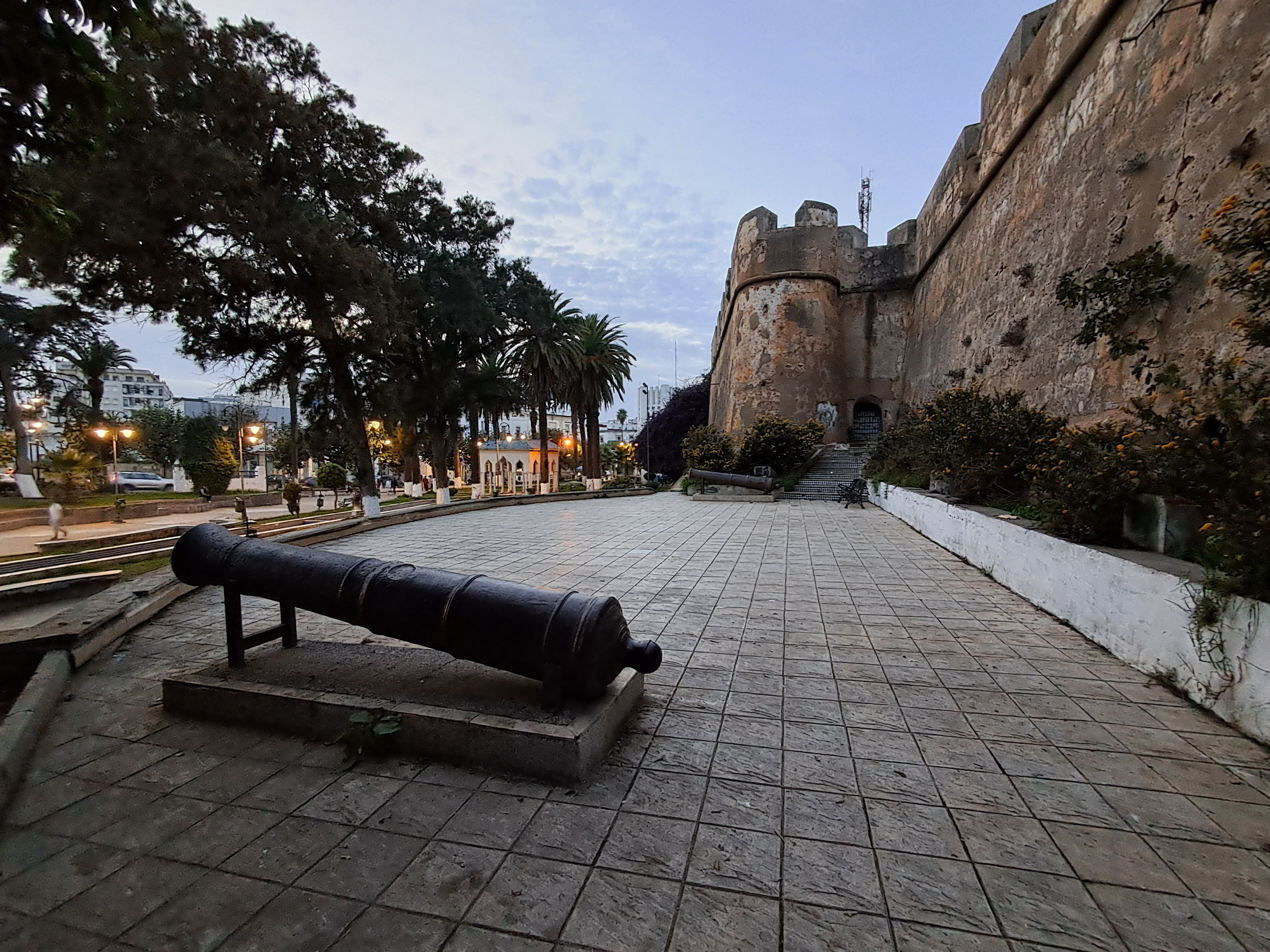
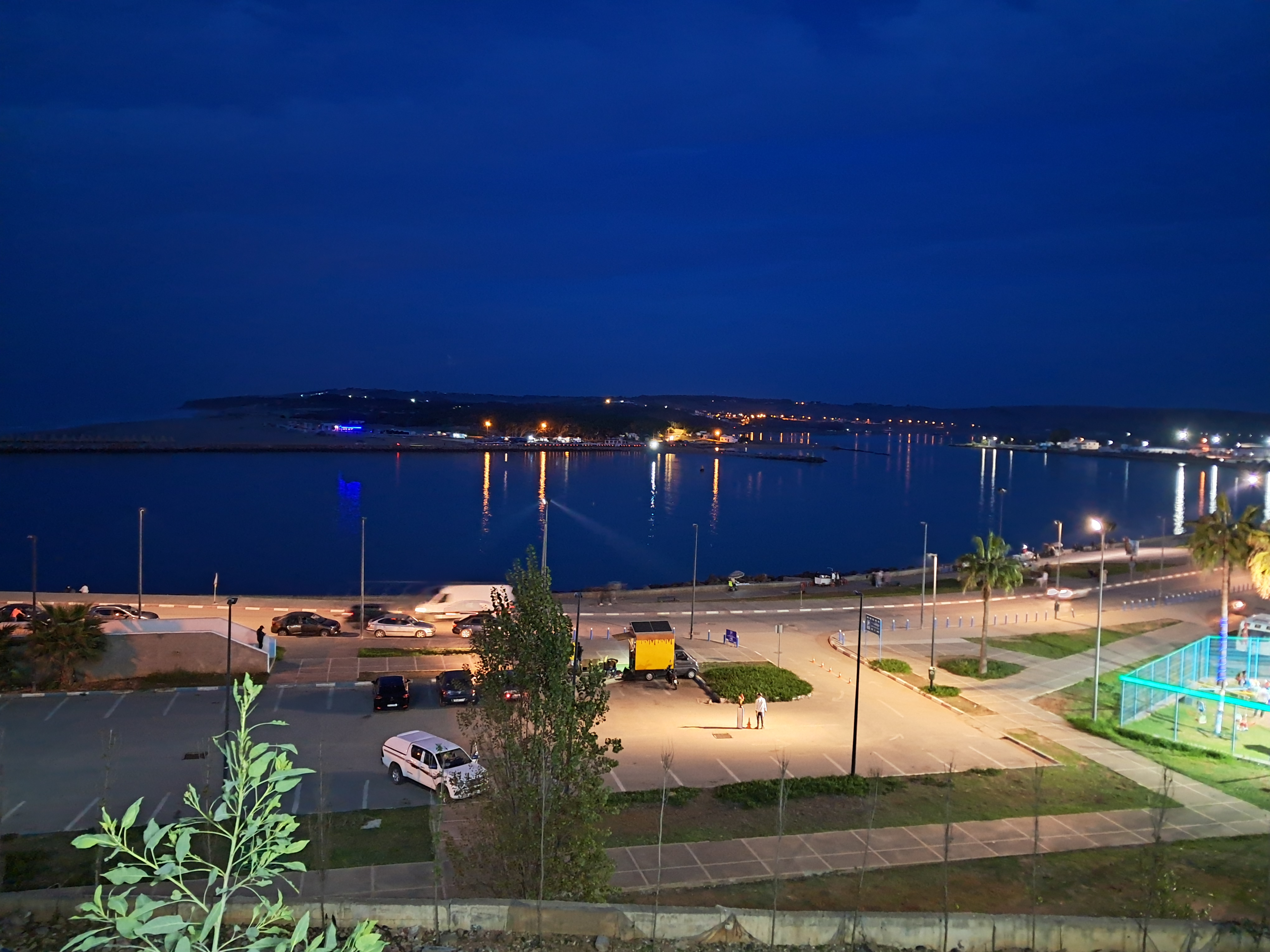
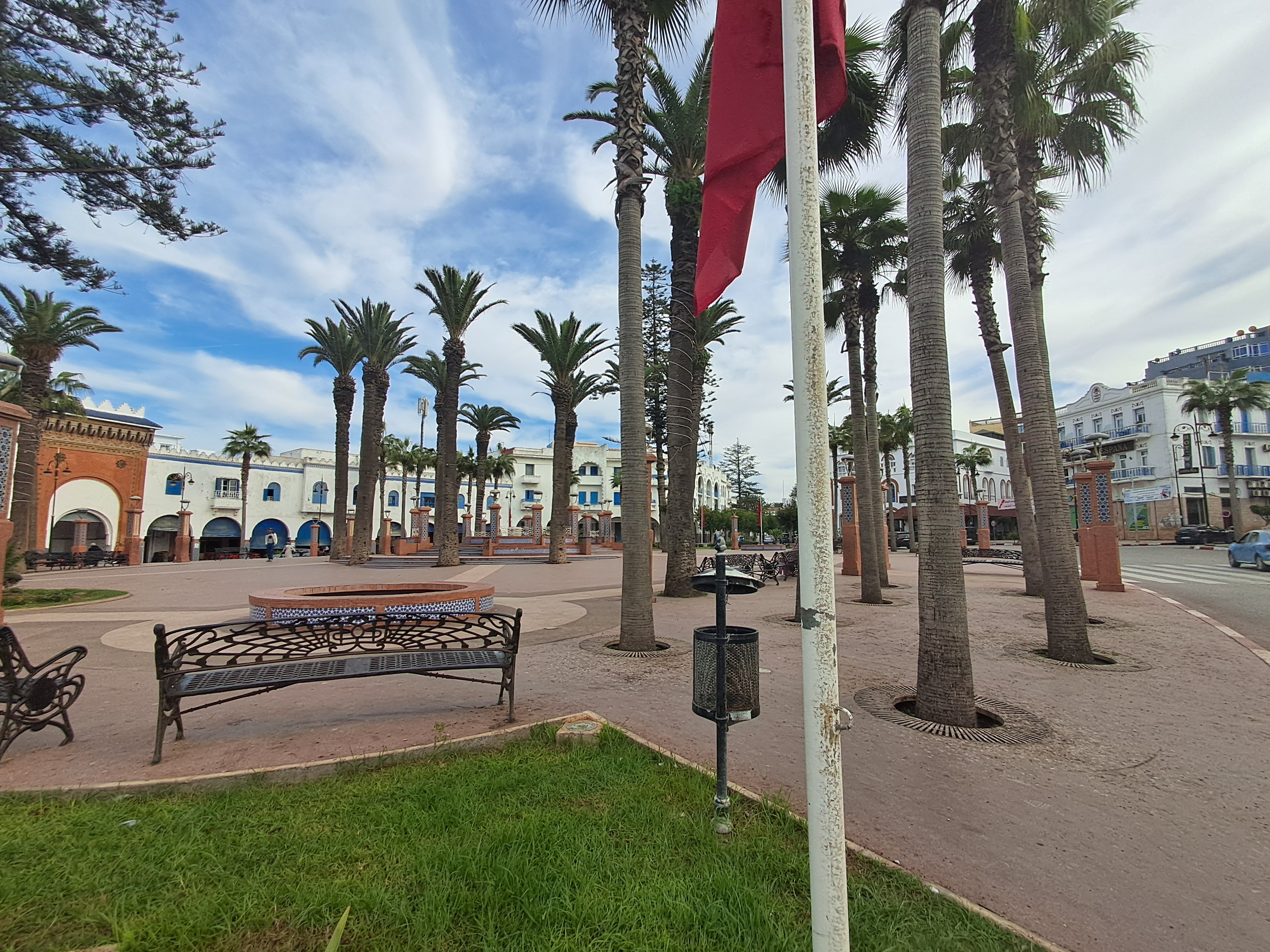
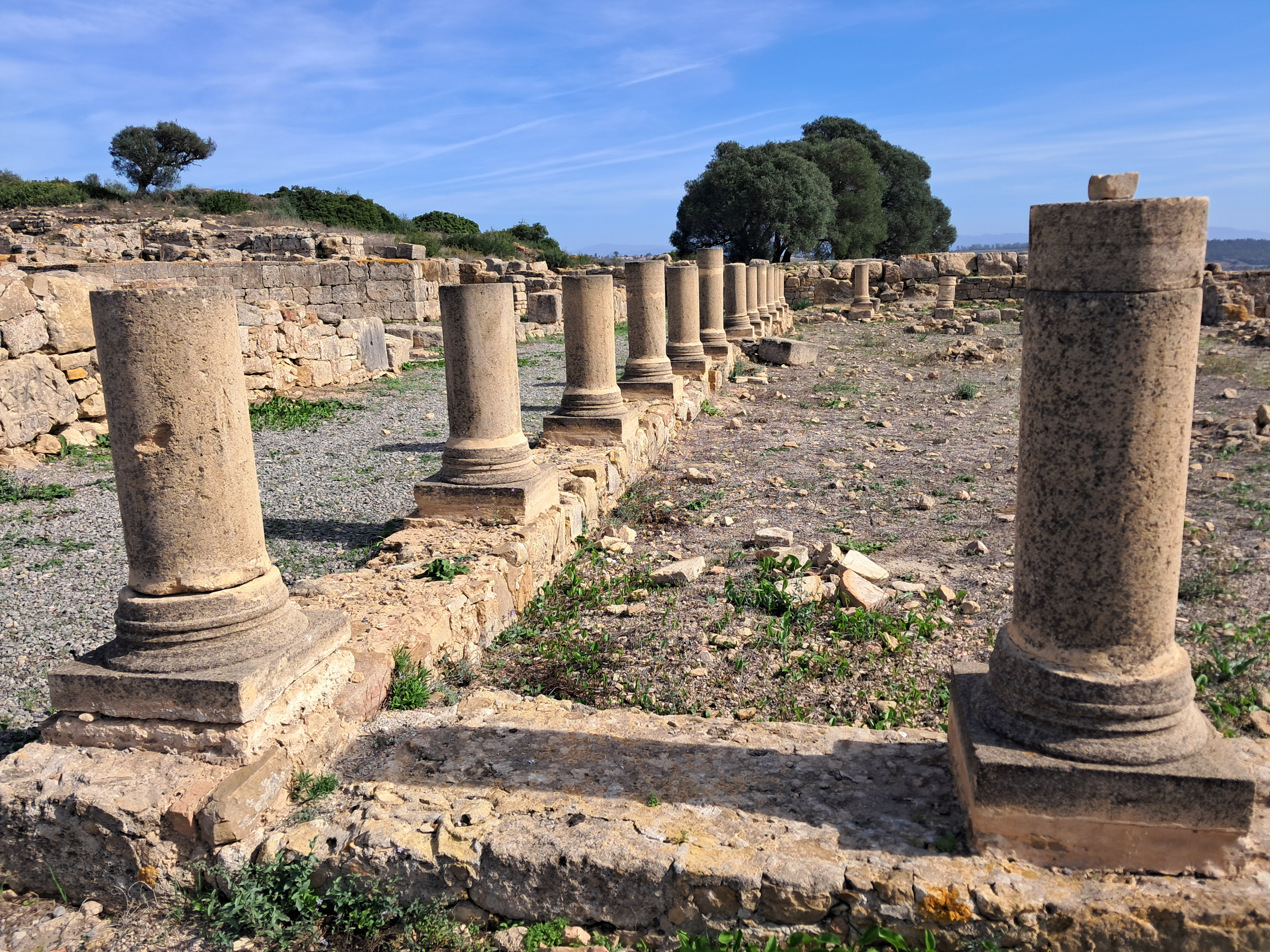

- Seal
- Interactive map of Larache
- Coordinates: 35°11′N 6°9′W
- Country: Morocco
- Region: Tanger-Tetouan-Al Hoceima
- Province: Larache
- Founded by the Phoenicians: c. 12th century BC

Population (2024)
  - Total: 133,731
- Time zone: UTC+0 (GMT)
- Postal code: 92000

Larache (Arabic: العرائش, romanized: al-ʿArāʾish) is a city in northwestern Morocco. It is on the Moroccan coast, where the Loukkos River meets the Atlantic Ocean. Larache is one of the most important cities of the Tanger-Tetouan-Al Hoceima region.

Many civilisations and cultures have influenced the history of Larache, starting in the ancient city of Lixus during the 12th century BCE. Between the period of being a strategic Berber town and then a Phoenician trading centre to Morocco's independence era around the 1950s, Larache was a nexus for many cultures.

== History ==
The ancient city of Lixus lies on the opposite bank of the Loukkos River (northern shore), the city was developed by the Phoenicians (8th–7th century BC) over a pre-existing Bronze Age Lixitae settlement, before the city of Carthage.

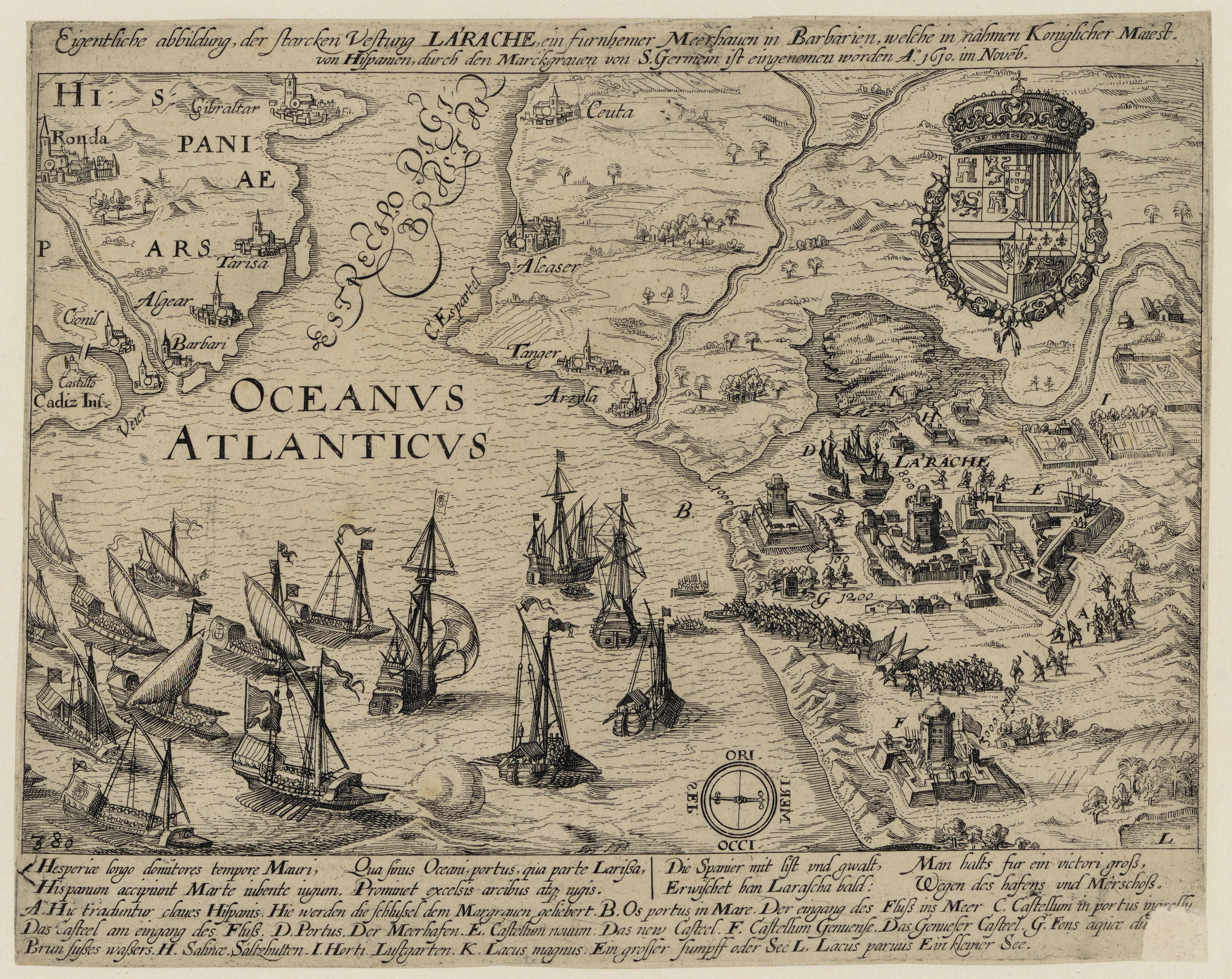
1610 map showing the Cession of Larache, depicting the town as the largest in the region

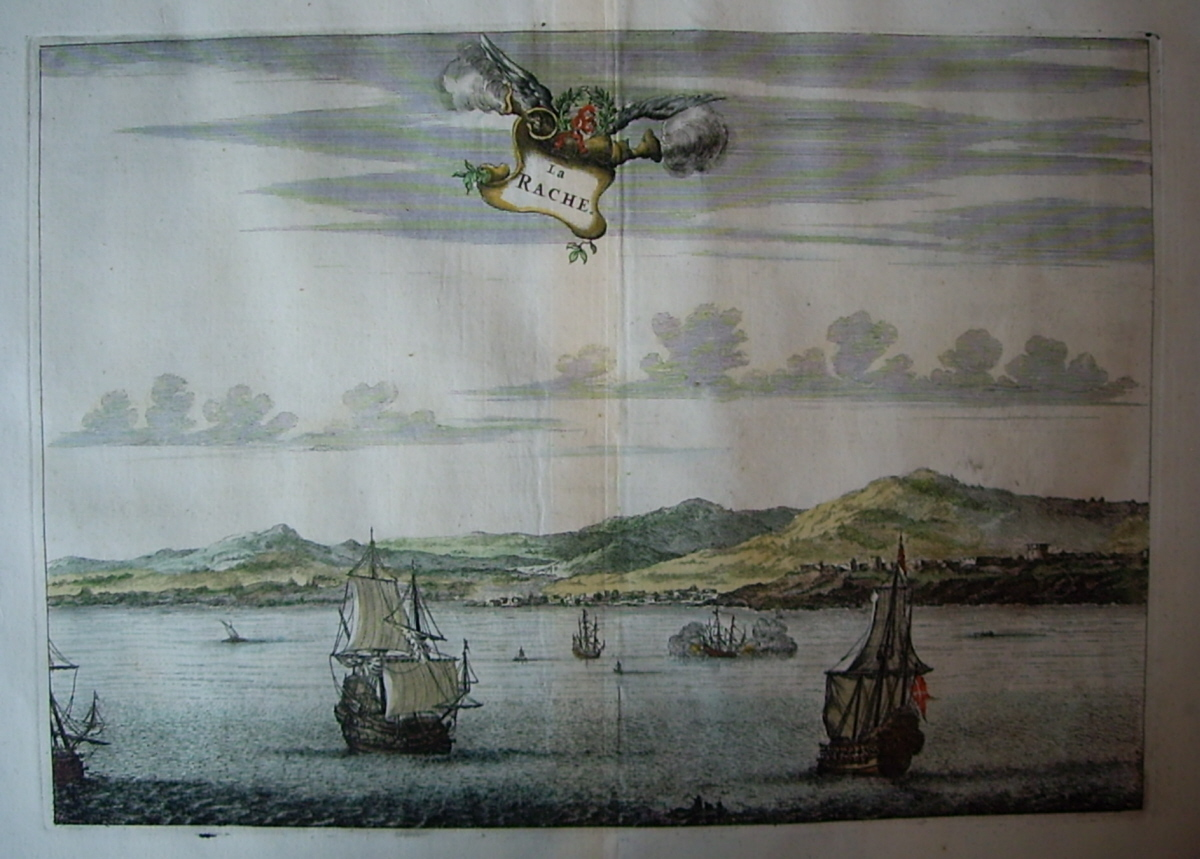
A view of the port of Larache around 1670.

The city is not mentioned in Arabic historical sources until the 13th century. It was founded by the Idrisite Banu 'Arus. Because of the abundant vines in the area, they named it al-'Ara'ish, meaning "trellis of grape vines", or al-'Arīsh mtā' Bnī 'Arūs ("grape vine trellis of the Banu 'Arus") in longer form. The Almohad caliph Ya'qub al-Mansur (r. 1184–1199) built a fortress here in the late 12th century. In 1270, the Spanish led a successful raid on the city.

In 1471, the Portuguese settlers from Asilah and Tangier drove the inhabitants out of Larache, and again it remained uninhabited until the Saadi Sultan Mohammed ash-Sheikh decided to repopulate it and build a stronghold on the plateau above river Loukos. He constructed a fortress at the entrance to the port as a means of controlling access to the river.

For a long time, attempts by the Portuguese, Spanish and French to take it met with no success. The Portuguese established the nearby Graciosa fortress in 1489. The Kasbah, which was built in 1491 by Moulay en Nasser, later became a pirate stronghold.

In 1610, the town passed to the Spanish, who stayed there until 1689, but who mainly used the ports as trading stops and never really administered the town. Moulay Ismail finally conquered Larache in 1689.

Attacks on Larache continued, but it still remained in Muslim hands. In 1765, a French fleet failed in the Larache expedition. In 1829, during the Austrian expedition against Morocco (1829), the Austrians punitively bombarded the city due to Moroccan piracy. In 1911, during the colonisation era, Spain occupied Larache and held it for 45 years until 1956.

On 7 March 2023, Moroccan archaeologists discovered an ancient tomb dating back over 2,000 years to the Mauretanian period.

== Geography ==
The city is located on the northwestern coast of Morocco, on the south bank at the mouth of the Loukkos River. It is roughly 80 kilometres (50 mi) southwest of Tangier. The city consists of a compact medina (historic old town), situated next to the river, and a larger "new town", established outside the old medina by the Spanish colonial administration after 1911 and stretching southwards over the coastal plateau.

=== Climate ===
Larache has a hot-summer Mediterranean climate (Köppen climate classification Csa) with heavy rainfall. The summers are moderately hot and sunny and the winters are wet and cool. The record high temperature of 46.4 °C (115.5 °F) was registered on July 10, 2021.

Climate data for Larache (1991–2020)
Month	Jan	Feb	Mar	Apr	May	Jun	Jul	Aug	Sep	Oct	Nov	Dec	Year
Record high °C (°F)	25.2 (77.4)	29.3 (84.7)	33.8 (92.8)	33.5 (92.3)	42.8 (109.0)	43.8 (110.8)	46.4 (115.5)	45.2 (113.4)	43.0 (109.4)	38.1 (100.6)	34.0 (93.2)	27.9 (82.2)	46.4 (115.5)
Mean daily maximum °C (°F)	16.7 (62.1)	17.5 (63.5)	19.7 (67.5)	21.0 (69.8)	23.9 (75.0)	26.5 (79.7)	28.3 (82.9)	28.7 (83.7)	27.0 (80.6)	24.4 (75.9)	20.2 (68.4)	17.8 (64.0)	22.6 (72.7)
Daily mean °C (°F)	12.4 (54.3)	13.2 (55.8)	15.2 (59.4)	16.5 (61.7)	19.4 (66.9)	21.7 (71.1)	23.8 (74.8)	24.2 (75.6)	22.6 (72.7)	20.1 (68.2)	16.0 (60.8)	13.7 (56.7)	18.2 (64.8)
Mean daily minimum °C (°F)	8.2 (46.8)	8.8 (47.8)	10.6 (51.1)	12.2 (54.0)	14.8 (58.6)	17.5 (63.5)	19.2 (66.6)	19.6 (67.3)	18.2 (64.8)	15.7 (60.3)	11.8 (53.2)	9.5 (49.1)	13.8 (56.8)
Record low °C (°F)	−3.0 (26.6)	−0.6 (30.9)	0.9 (33.6)	5.6 (42.1)	7.0 (44.6)	10.5 (50.9)	13.0 (55.4)	13.5 (56.3)	11.9 (53.4)	7.2 (45.0)	2.8 (37.0)	1.3 (34.3)	−3.0 (26.6)
Average precipitation mm (inches)	104.7 (4.12)	69.6 (2.74)	64.2 (2.53)	68.3 (2.69)	30.2 (1.19)	5.1 (0.20)	0.8 (0.03)	2.0 (0.08)	21.7 (0.85)	83.5 (3.29)	129.1 (5.08)	121.3 (4.78)	700.5 (27.58)
Average precipitation days (≥ 1.0 mm)	7.8	7.4	7.2	6.9	4.1	0.8	0.2	0.4	2.3	6.5	8.1	8.9	60.6
Source: NOAA

== Demographics ==
In the 2024 Moroccan census, the commune of Larache recorded a population of 133,731 inhabitants.

== Sites of interest ==
=== Landmarks ===
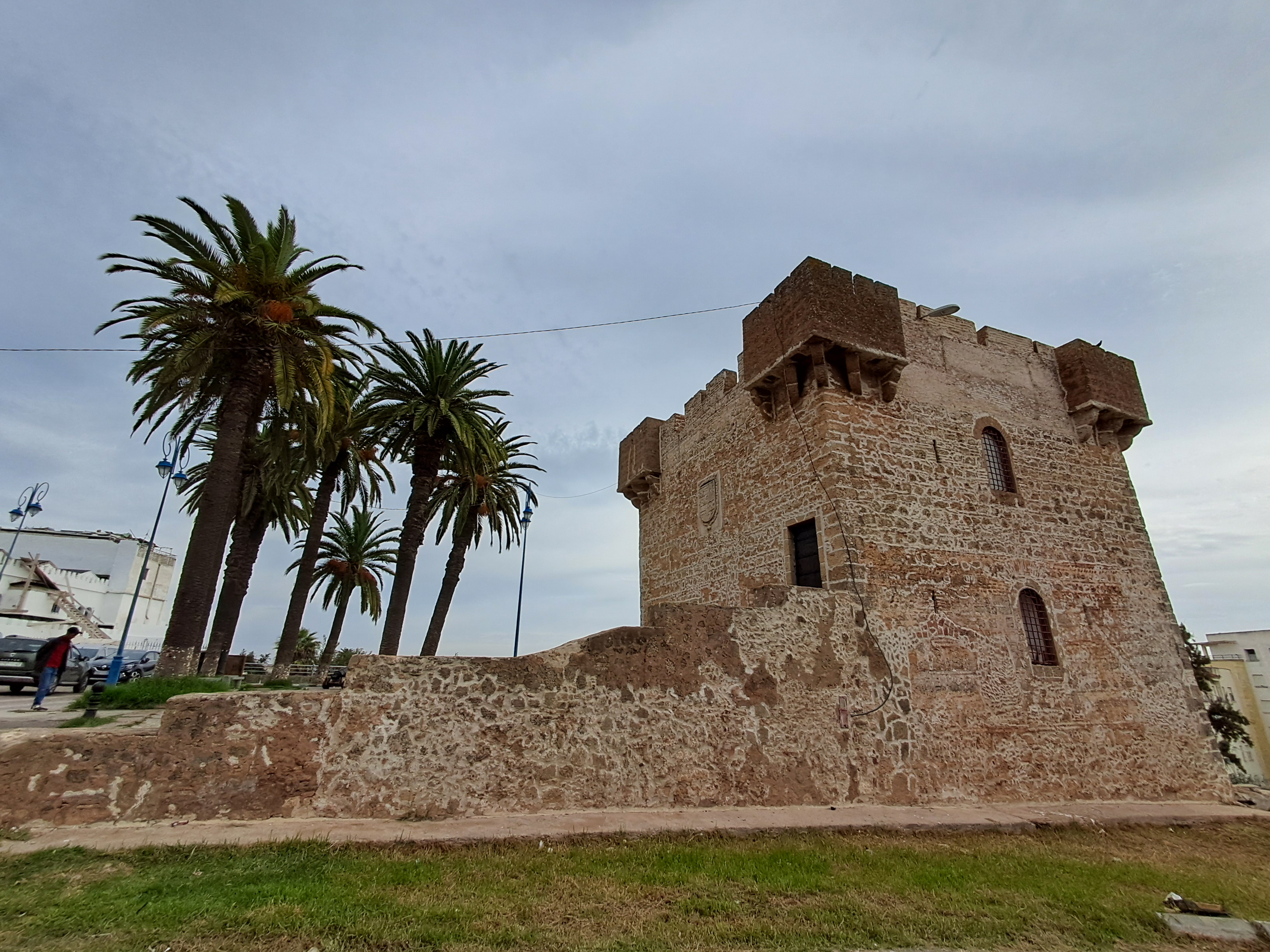
Archaeological Museum of Larache

- Port Lixus
- Plaza de España
- Oued Loukos (Loukkos River)
- Charie Mohammed Al-Khamis (Boulevard Mohammed V)
- Storks Castle
- Boukharis House
- Torres Park
- Jardin of Lions
- The Conservatory of Music
- Kessba, Gebibat & Bab Behar (Old Medina)
- Port of Larache
- Dghoghi Houses
- Balcon Atlantico
- Grave of Jean Genet
- Jewish Cemetery

=== Lixus ===
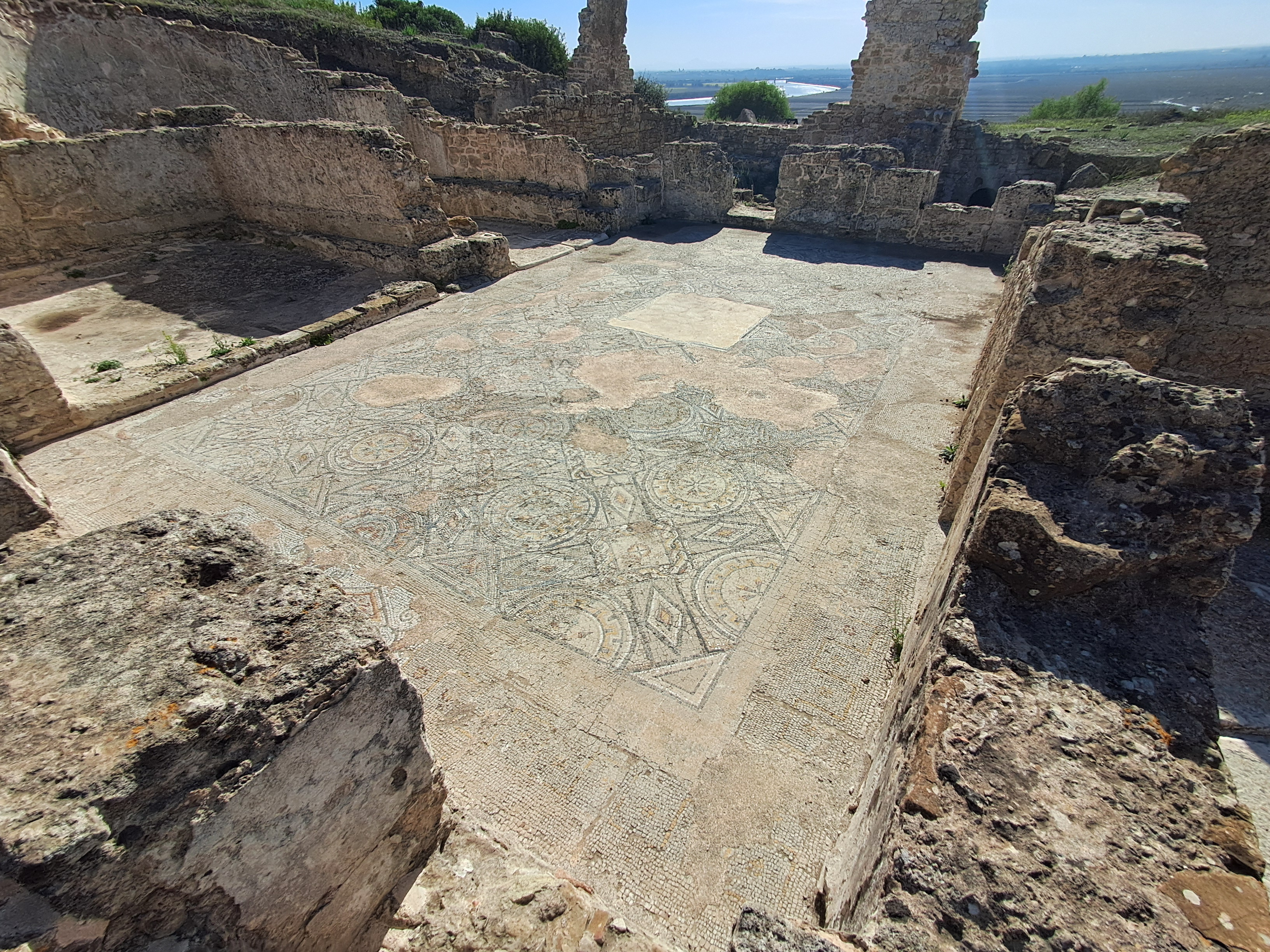
The ruins of Lixus

Lixus is the site of an ancient city located in Morocco just north of the modern seaport of Larache on the bank of the Loukkos River. It was built by the Phoenicians in 1180 BC. Lixus was part of a chain of Phoenician/Carthaginian settlements; other major settlements further to the south are Chellah and Mogador. When Carthage fell to Ancient Rome, Lixus, Chellah and Mogador were annexed to the Kingdom of Mauretania.

This ancient Mauritanian city gradually grew in importance, later coming under Carthaginian domination. After the destruction of Carthage, Lixus fell to Amazigh (Berber) control, reaching its zenith during the reign of the Mauritanian king Juba II.

Some ancient Greek writers located at Lixus the mythological garden of the Hesperides, the keepers of the golden apples. The name of the city which was often mentioned by writers from Hanno the Navigator to the Geographer of Ravenna and confirmed by the legend on its coins and by an inscription. The ancients believed this to be the site of the Garden of the Hesperides and of a sanctuary of Hercules, where Hercules gathered gold apples, more ancient than the one at Cadiz, Spain. However, there are no grounds for the claim that Lixus was founded at the end of the second millennium BC. Life was maintained there nevertheless until the Islamic conquest of North Africa by the presence of a mosque and a house with a patio with walls covered with painted stuccos.

== Education ==
Larache offers 3 types of education systems: Arabic, French and Spanish. Each offers classes starting from pre-Kindergarten up to the 12th grade, as for German in the three last years of high school. The Baccalauréat, or high school diploma are the diplomas offered after clearing the 12 grades.

=== Primary education ===
There are tens Moroccan primary schools, dispersed across the city. Private and public schools, they offer education in Arabic, French and some school English until the 5th grade. Mathematics, Arts, Science Activities and nonreligious modules are commonly taught in the primary school.

=== International Schools ===
The Colegio Español Luis Vives is a Spanish international school located in Larache, Morocco.

=== Higher education ===
==== Polydisciplinary Faculty of Larache ====
The Polydisciplinary Faculty of Larache is part of Abdelmalek Essaâdi University in Morocco. This institution offers a diverse range of programs across various fields of study, including sciences, humanities, and social sciences.

==== Teacher Training Centre ====
The CFI Larache, a Centre for Teacher Training is a higher education institution affiliated with the Ministry of Higher Education, Scientific Research, and Professional Training. The CFI Larache accepts holders of DUT, BTS, DEUG, DEUST, or equivalent diplomas and prepares them with pedagogical and theoretical training for a career as teachers.

==== ISTA ====
The Institut Spécialisé de Technologie Appliquée (ISTA) Larache is a key vocational training institute in Larache, Morocco, affiliated with the Office de la Formation Professionnelle et de la Promotion du Travail (OFPPT). It offers a variety of programs in fields such as mechanics, electronics, computer science, and construction, designed to equip students with both theoretical knowledge and practical skills.

== Notable people ==
- Jean Genet lived for several years and had requested to be buried there. His grave is in the Spanish cemetery of Larache
- Amina Filali, whose suicide in 2012 sparked a political debate on women's rights and article 475 of the Moroccan penal code
- Juan Goytisolo, Spanish novelist, is buried in the Spanish cemetery of Larache
- Mohamed Chrif Tribak, Moroccan filmmaker and screenwriter

== Sister cities ==
- Almuñécar, Spain

== Gallery ==
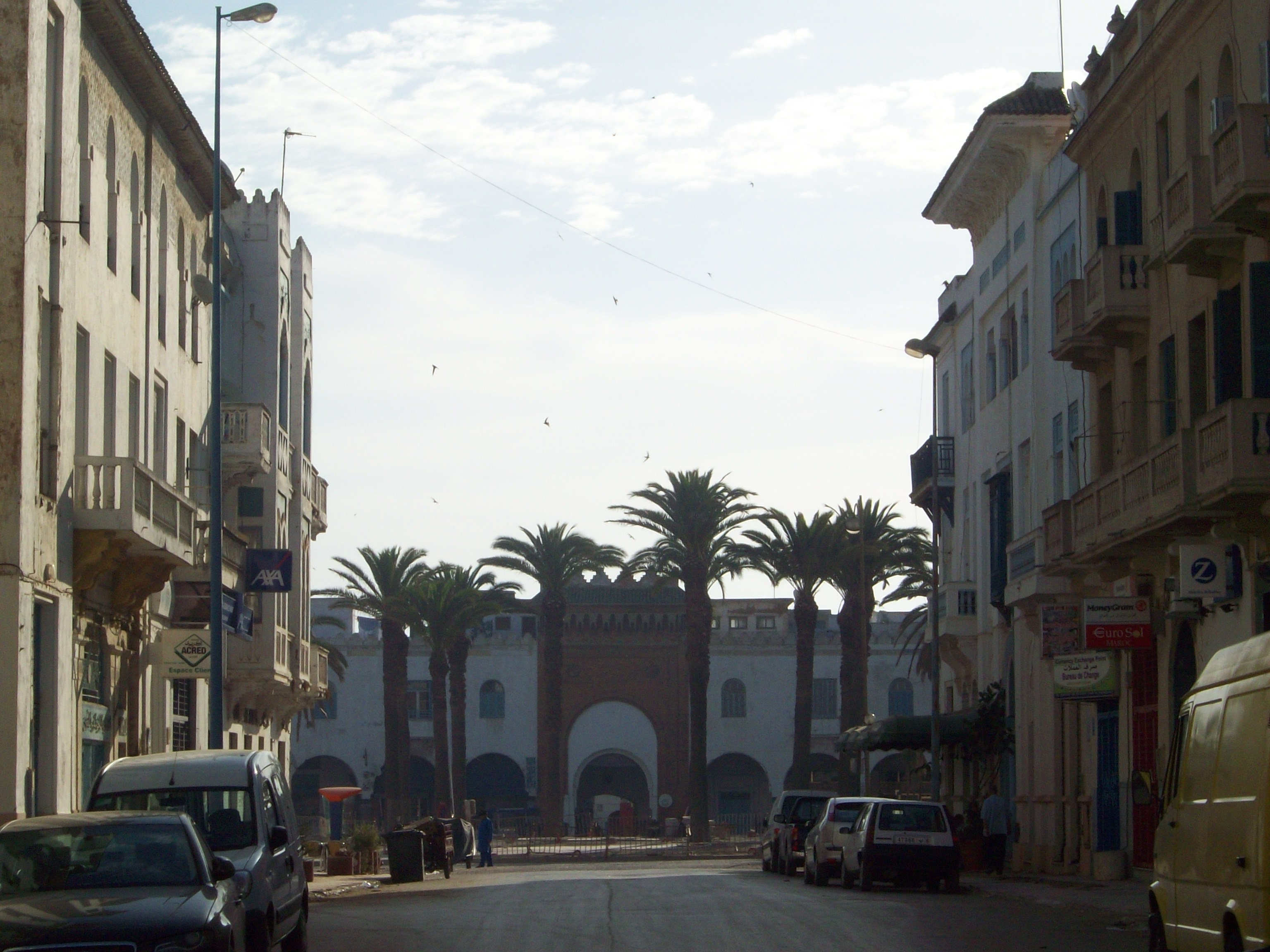
Plaza de España

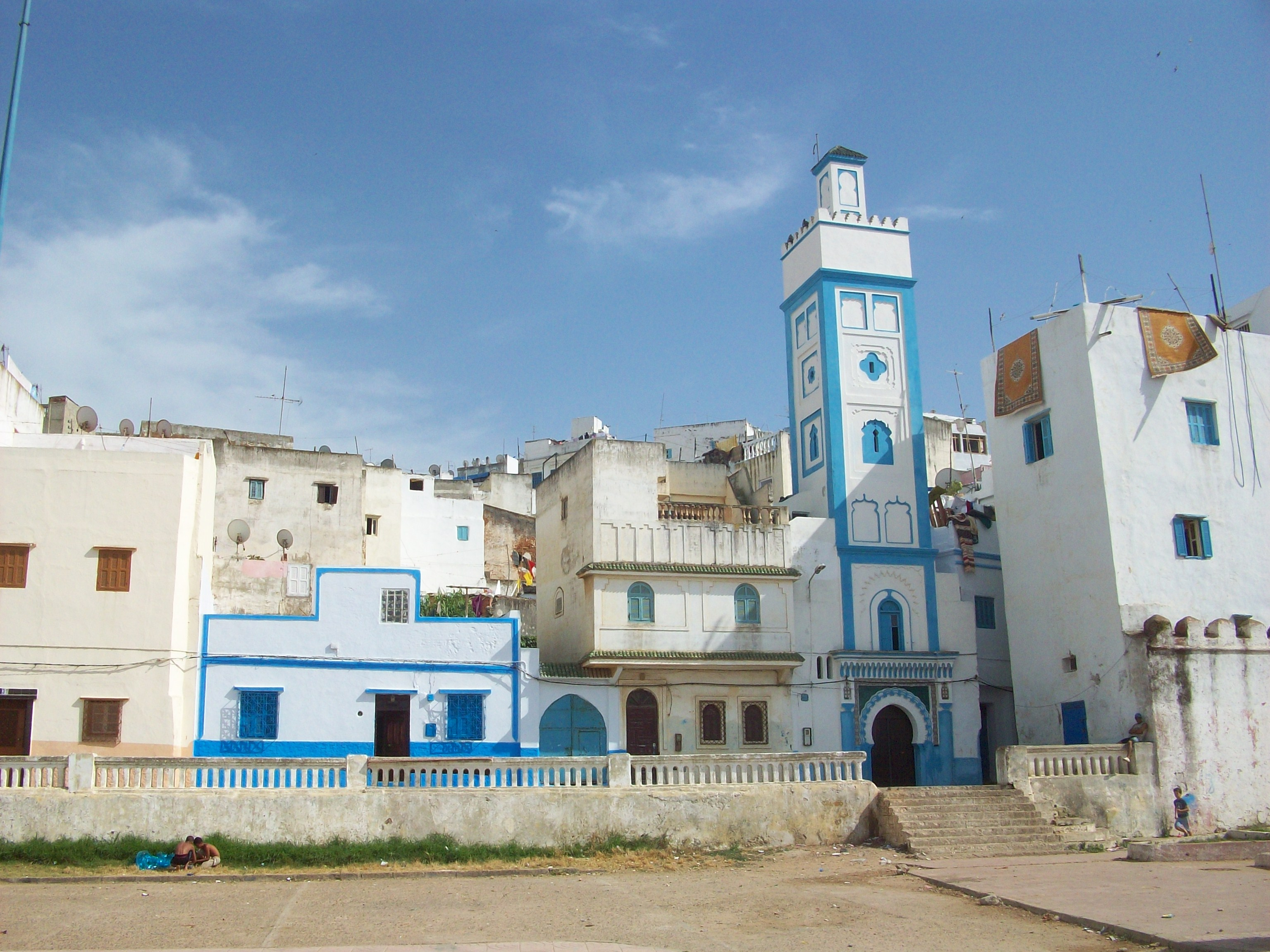
Bab Behar or Old Medina

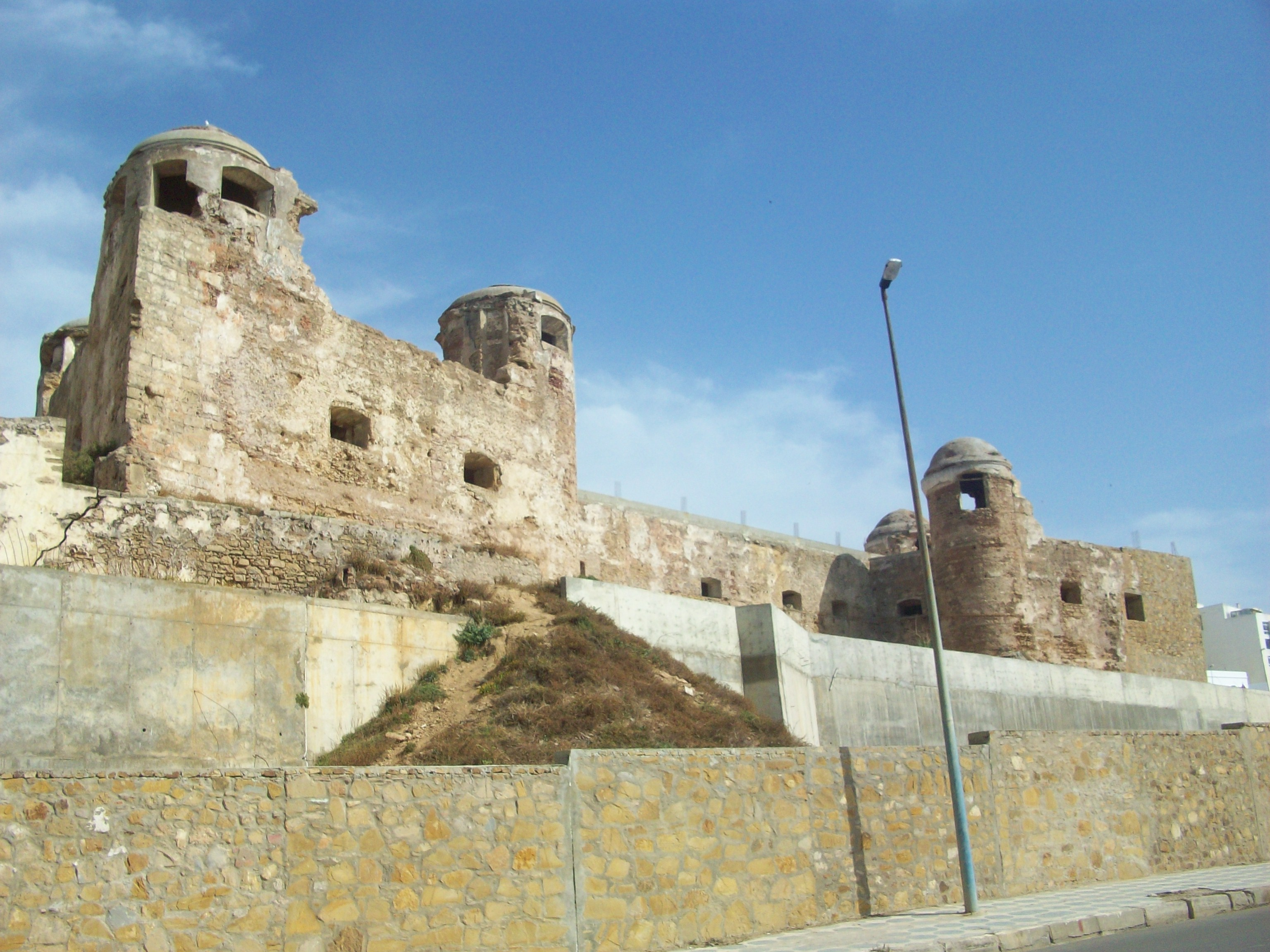
Larache Fortress

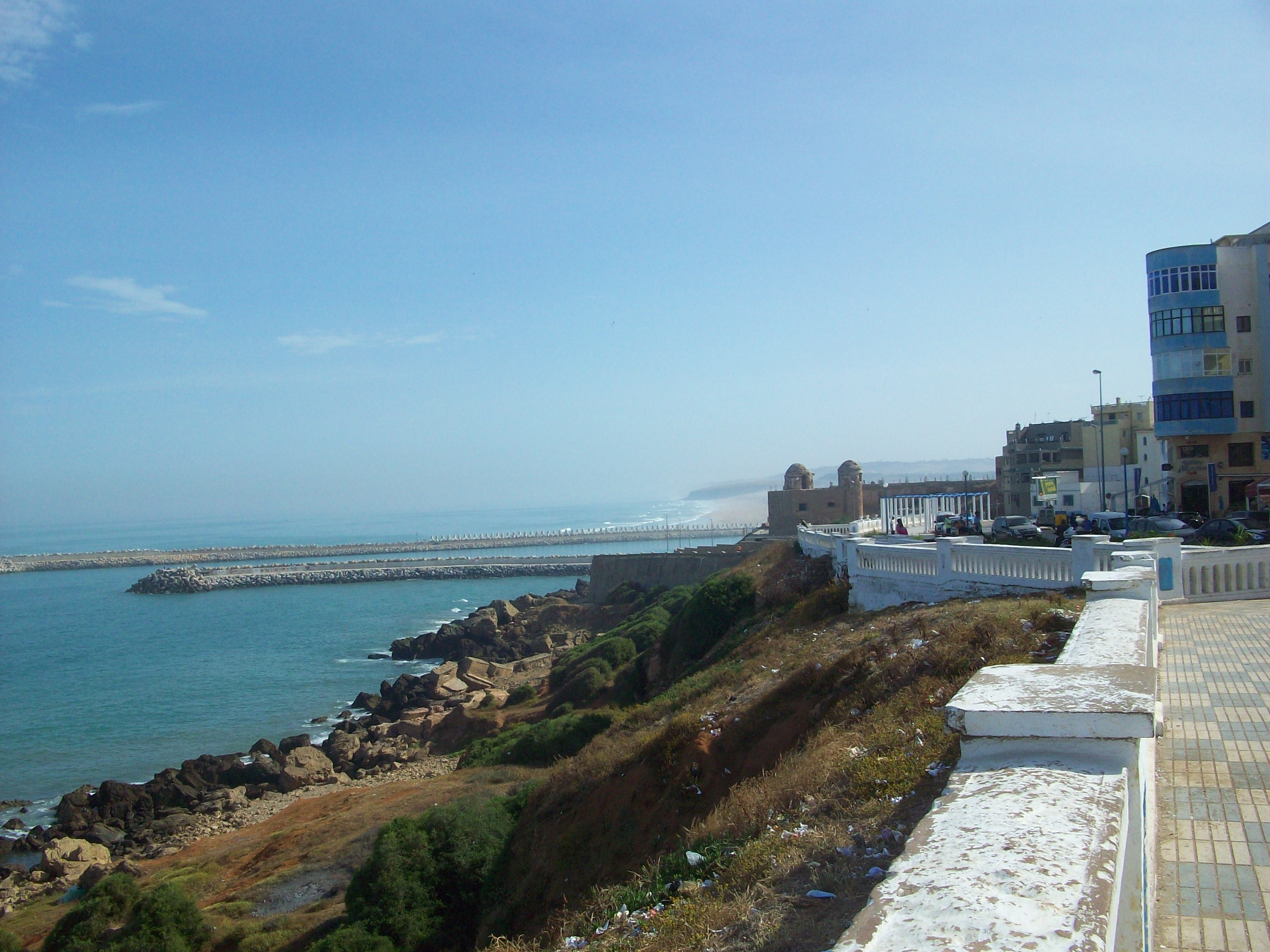
Balcon Atlantico

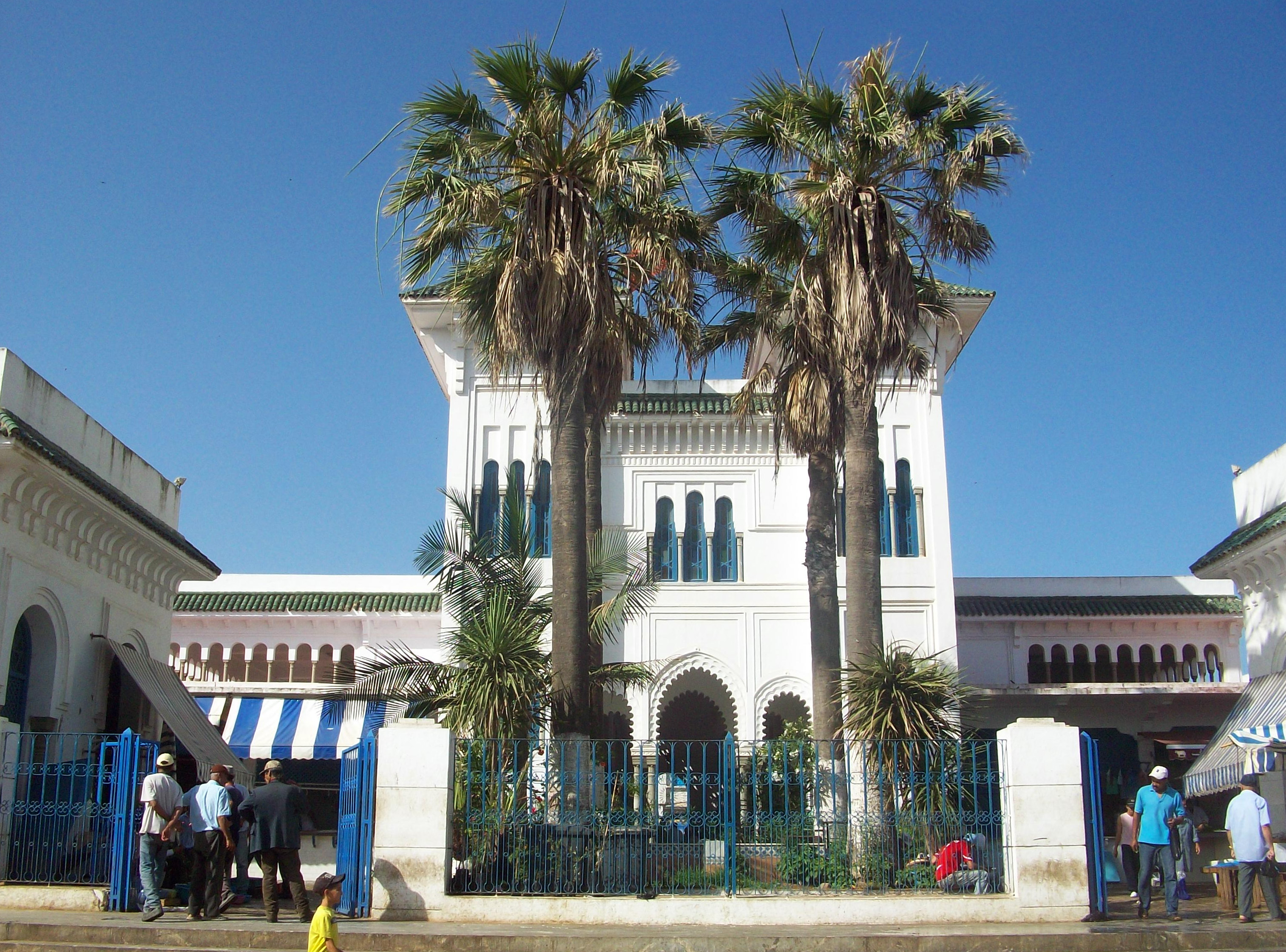
Larache Souk

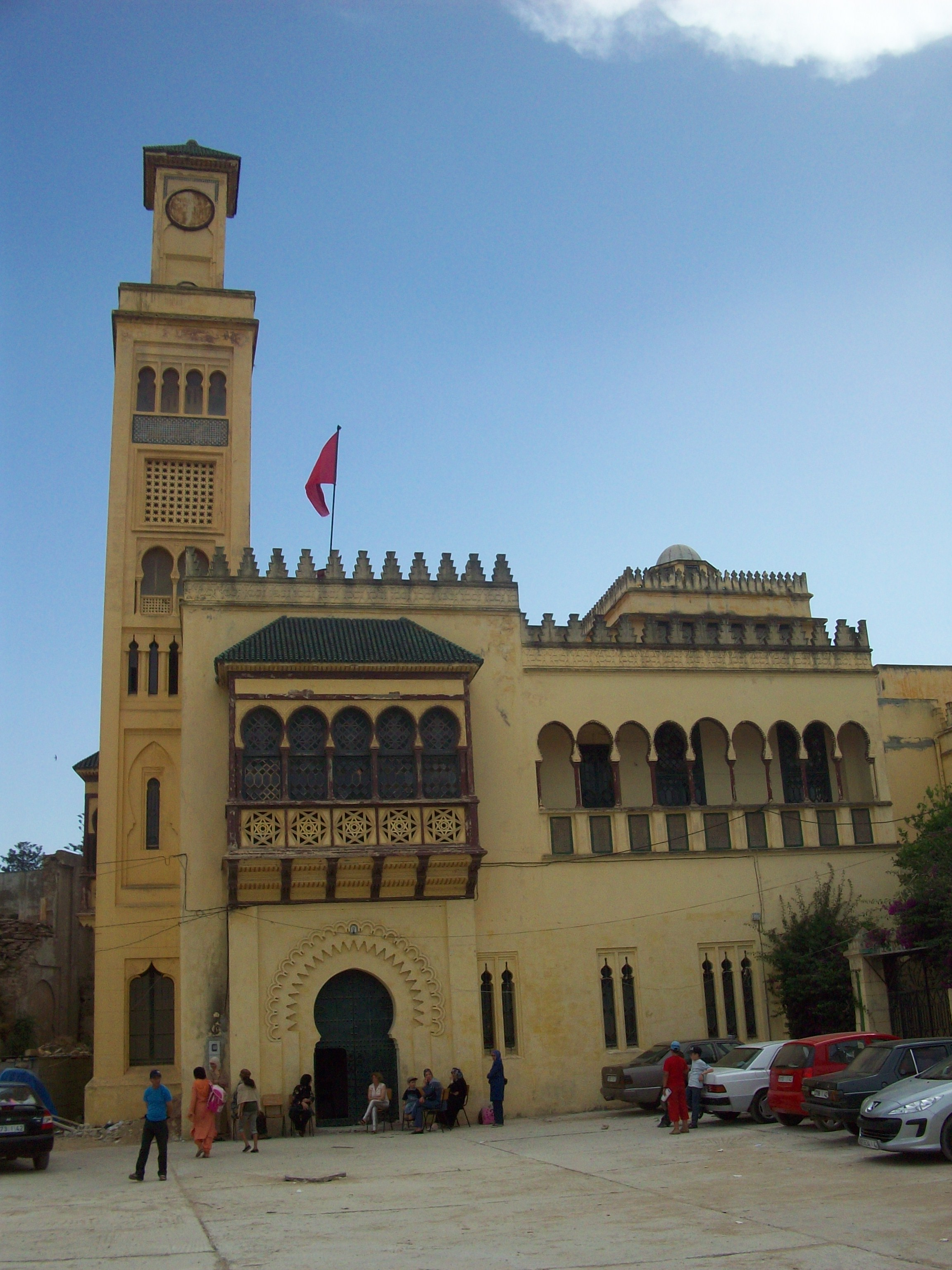
Larache Music Academy

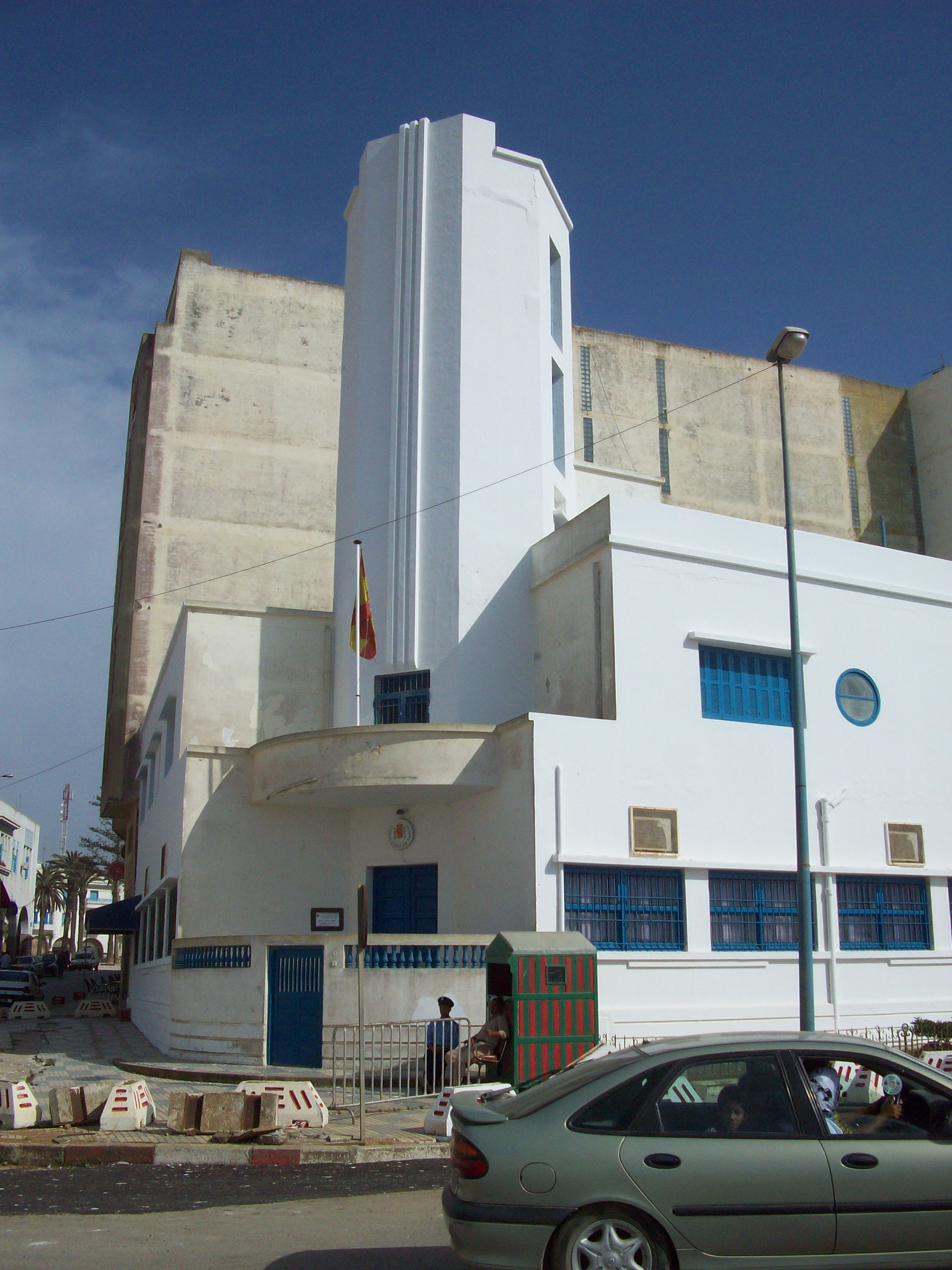
Spanish Consulate

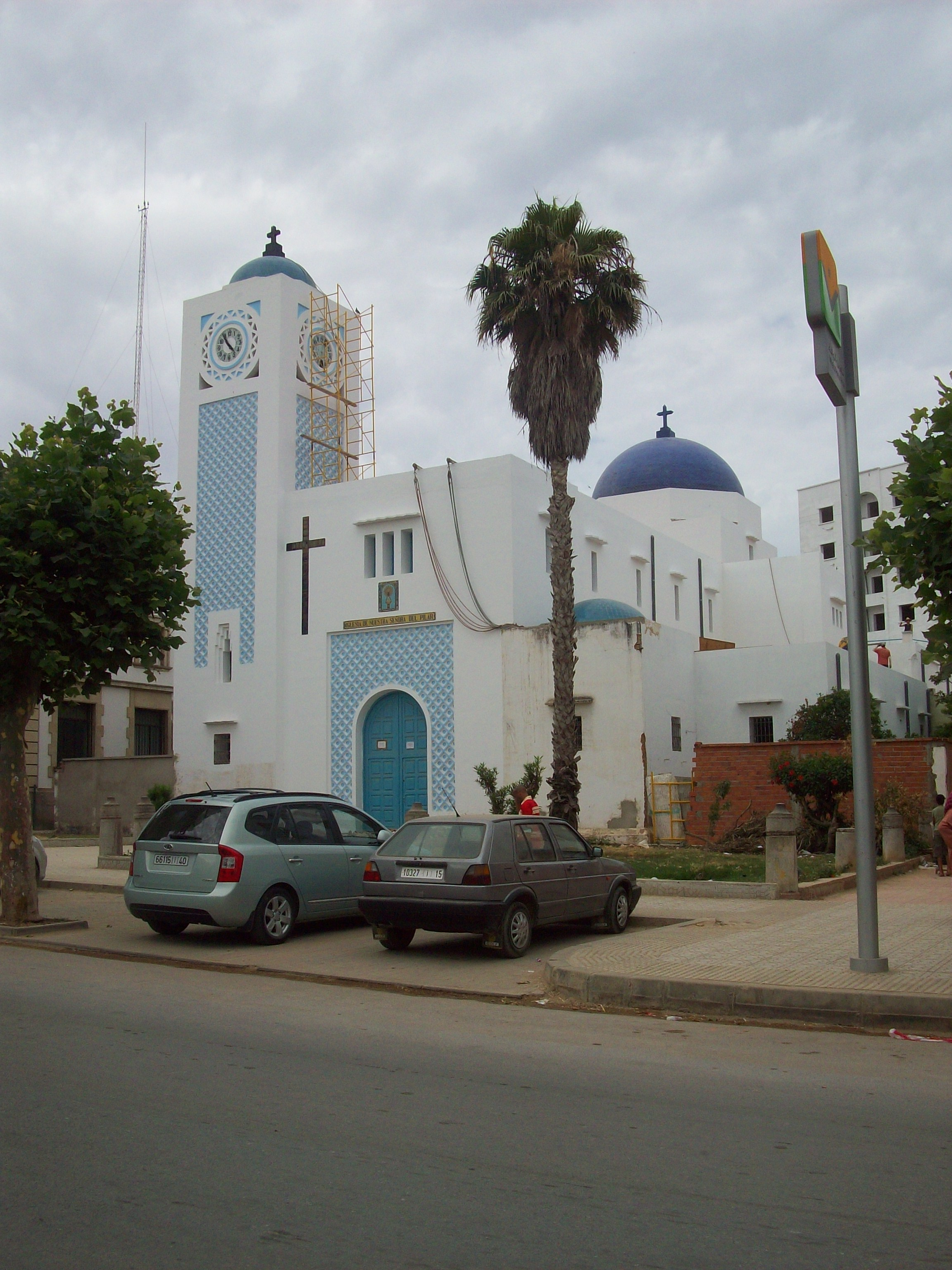
Iglesia Pilar

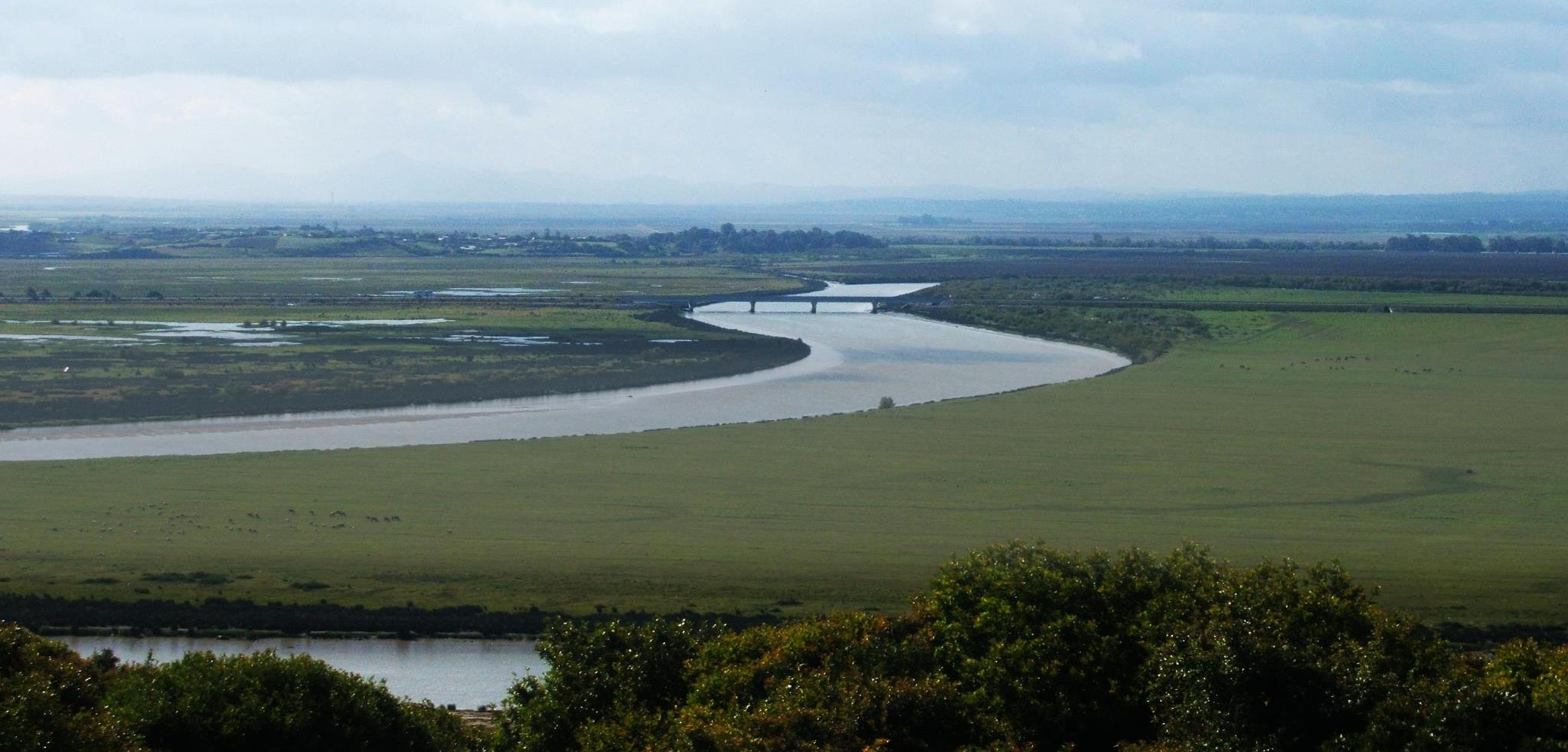
Oued Loukous

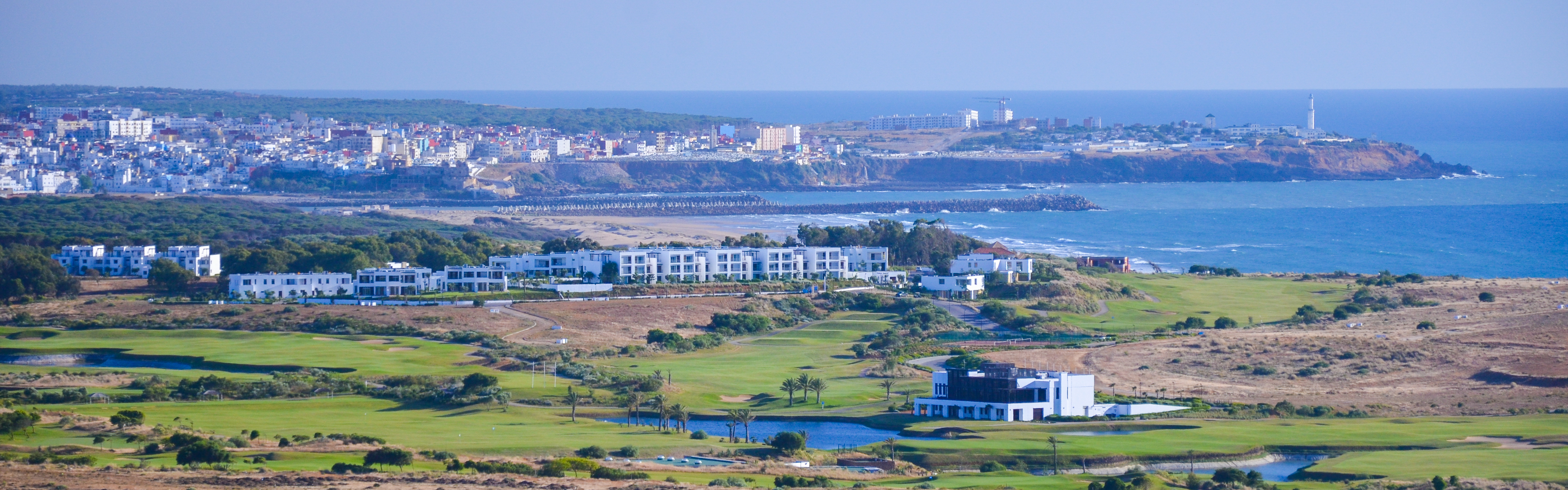
Larache and the Atlantic Ocean

== See also ==
- Larache Province
- Lixus
- Loukkos River
- Chabab Larache an old famous football club from the city
- Oussama Belhcen a musician from Larache
- European enclaves in North Africa before 1830
