= Chabab Larache =

Moroccan football club

- Full name: Chabab Larache
- Founded: 1913
- Chairman: Moustapha Sebnaoui
- Manager: Laghrissi
- League: Second Division Amateur
Home colours	Away colours

Chabab Larache is a Moroccan football club currently playing in the Second Division Amateur, the city from Larache.
