= Mohammed Chabab =

Moroccan composer and pianist

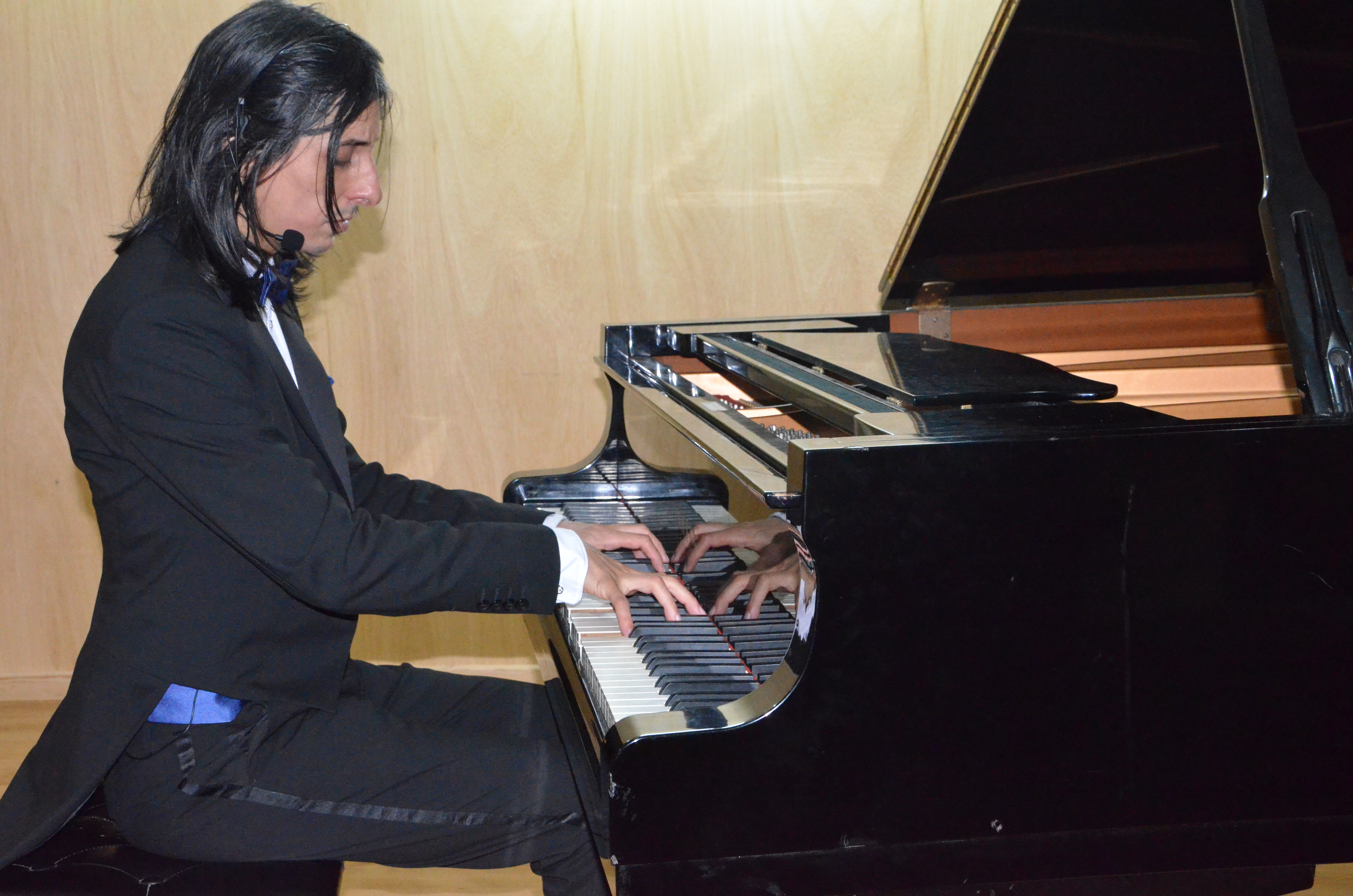

Background information
- Origin: Meknes, Morocco
- Genres: Classical music
- Occupation(s): Soloist; Composer
- Instrument: Piano
- Years active: 2008–present
- Labels: iM Classic (EU)
- Website: Home Page

Mohammed Chabab (Arabic: شباب محمد; pronounced [muħammad ʃabab]) is a Moroccan composer and pianist.

== Biography ==
Mohammed Chabab was born in Meknes. In 2008 he graduated from the National Conservatory of Music and Dance in Rabat with diplomas in piano mastery and in music harmony. His melodies are influenced by romanticism and impressionism. He has been a piano and music composition teacher at the National Institute for Music and Dance in Rabat from 2008.

Since 2008, Chabab has participated as a composer and solo pianist in festivals such as the International Festival Mauricio Kagael Composition Competition in Austria, the Valtidone Festival in Italy, and several concerts in Morocco.

In 2015 he won the Special Jury Prize at the International Competition of Bulgaria.

In 2016 Chabab released his first album, including 16 suites of classical music in piano solo, titled Au Cœur d'une musique.

== Discography ==
=== Studio albums/CD ===
- Au coeur d'une Music (2016)
- Promesse d'amour (2016)
- Révérence d’automne (2018)

=== Concerts ===
- On the Way of Creation (2017)
