= Loukkos =

River in northern Morocco

Coordinates: 35°12′15″N 6°08′34″W

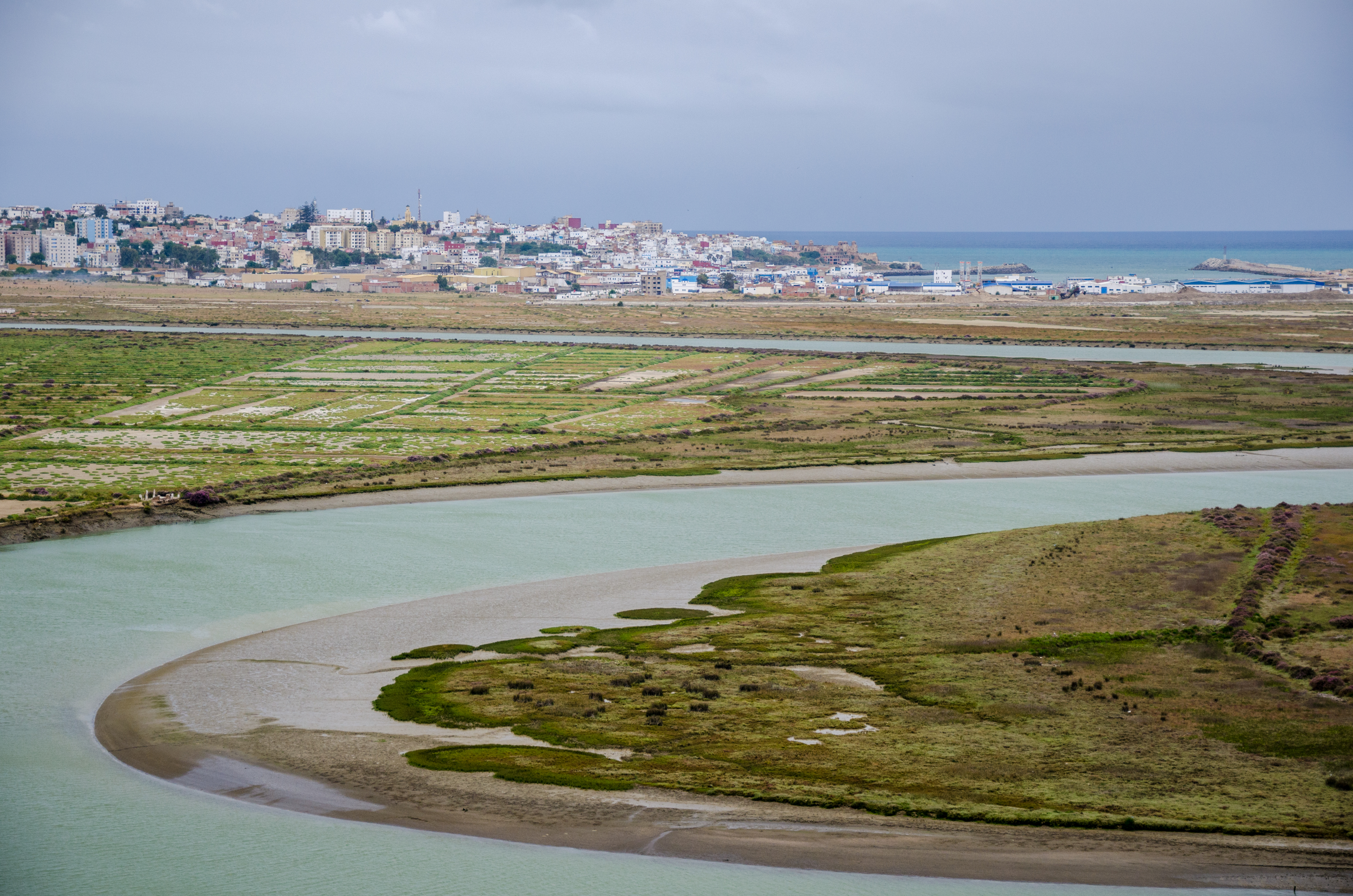
- View of the river near Larache
- Native name: Arabic: واد لوكوس; Standard Moroccan Tamazight: ⴰⵙⵉⴼ ⵏ ⵍⵓⴽⵓⵙ

Location
- Country: Morocco
- Region: Tangier-Tétouan-Al Hoceima

Physical characteristics
- Source: Rif Mountains
- Mouth: Atlantic Ocean
  - location: Larache

Basin features

Ramsar Wetland
- Official name: Complexe du bas Loukkos
- Designated: 15 January 2005
- Reference no.: 1475

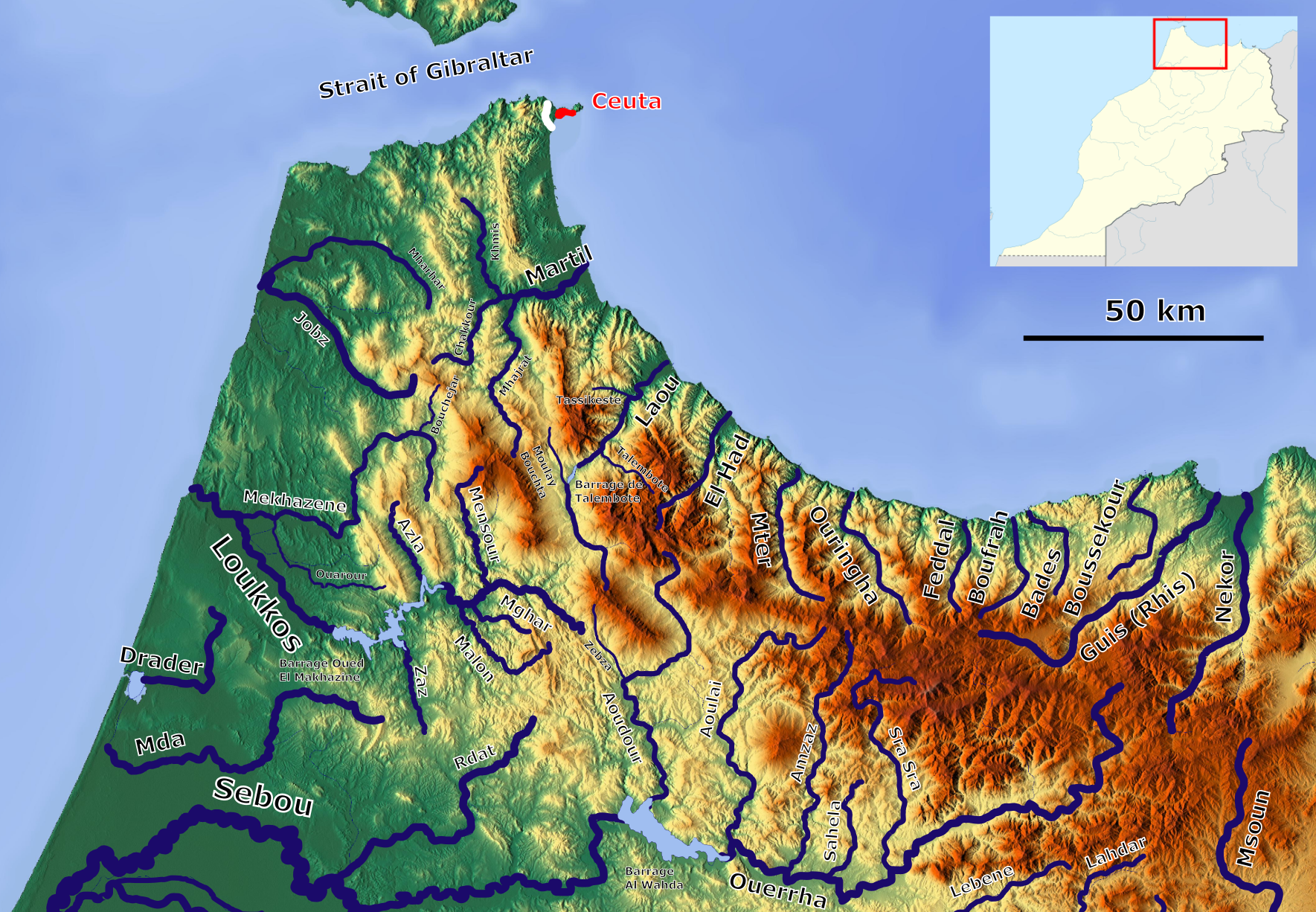
The rivers in north-west Morocco with the Loukos (centre left)

The Loukkos (Arabic: واد لوكوس; Standard Moroccan Tamazight: ⴰⵙⵉⴼ ⵏ ⵍⵓⴽⵓⵙ) is a major river in northern Morocco. Although it is relatively short (about 100 km), the river is the third largest in Morocco with an average flow of 50 m³/s. The Loukkos river's source is located in the Rif Mountains and flows into the Atlantic Ocean in the city of Larache; the city's port is on the river.

The Loukkos river basin is 3,730 km^{2} and contains one of the most fertile and productive agricultural lands in the country. One of the river's tributaries, Oued Makhazine, is of historical importance since it witnessed the Battle of Alcácer Quibir on 4 August 1578.

The Lukkus is the largest river in northern Morocco. The river can cause great flooding in times of flood. In 1775 the river appeared on a map by Tomás López and Vargas with the denomination of "River Lucos.

The main dam on the Loukkos is the Oued El Makhazine dam.

== History ==
=== Ancient history ===
Ancient Lixus is located on Tchemmich Hill on the right bank of the Loukkos River (other names: Oued Loukous; Locus River), just to the north of the modern seaport of Larache. The site lies within the urban perimeter of Larache, and about three kilometres inland from the mouth of the river and the Atlantic Ocean. From its 80 metres above the plain the site dominates the marshes through which the river flows.

Lixus was established as a Phoenician colony, subsequent to Phoenician navigators traversing the Alboran Sea to reach the Atlantic Ocean. Among the ruins at Lixus there are baths, temples, 4th century AD walls, a mosaic floor, and the intricate remains of the Capitol.

Further upstream, El-Ksar el Kebir, was established as a Carthaginian colony which after the Punic Wars came under Roman control with the name Oppidum Novum.

=== Modern history ===
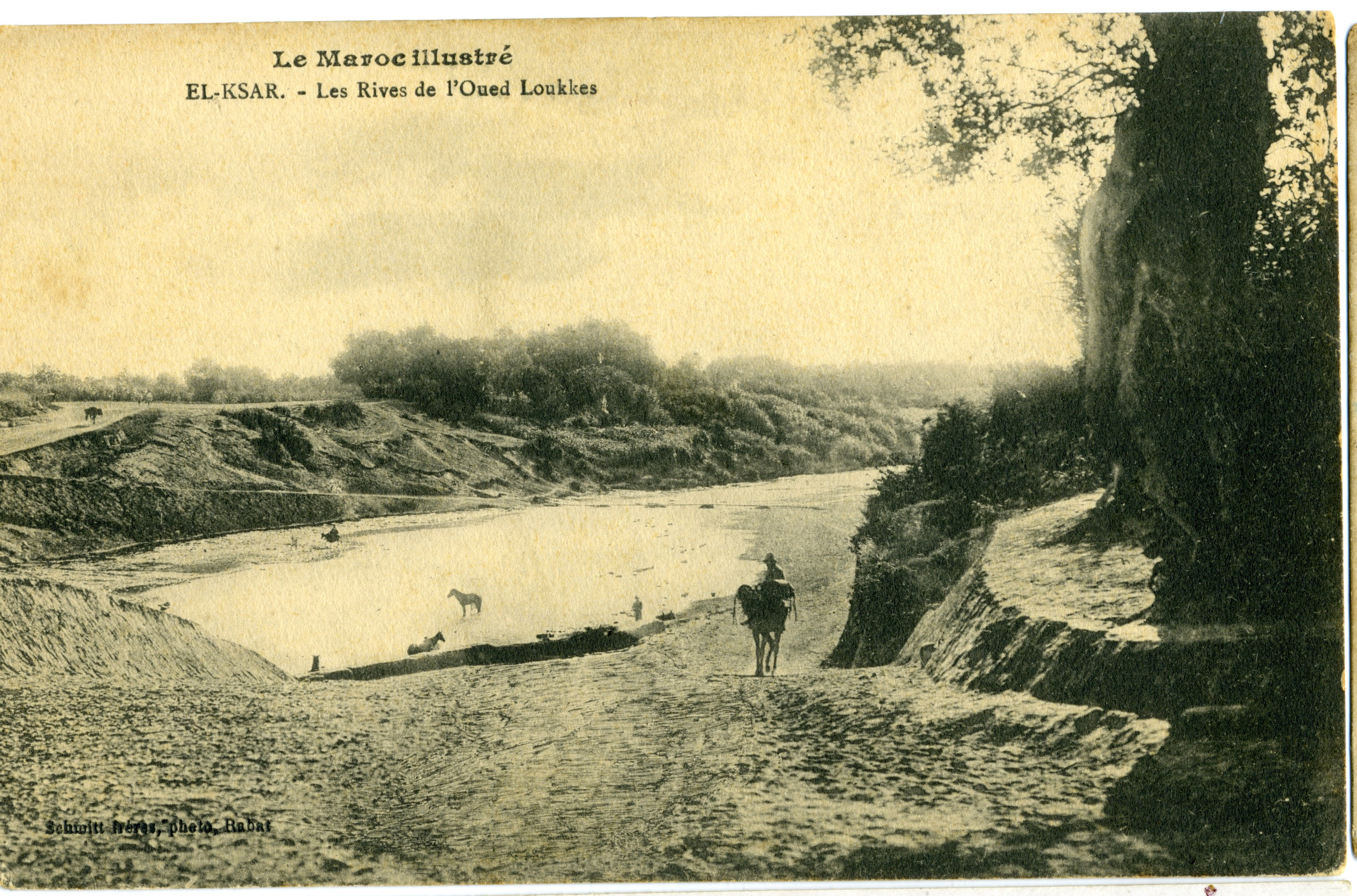
Lukkus River at Ksar El Kebir in 1900

The confluence of the Loukkos River and its tributaries, the al-Mahazin, was the site of a significant battle in 1578 - the Battle of Alcácer Quibir, in which two rival claimant to the throne of Morocco were both killed as was the king of Portugal. Sebastian of Portugal, king Abu Marwan Abd al-Malik I Saadi and his rival Abu Abdallah Mohammed II Saadi were all killed and ended Portugal's ambitions to invade and Christianize the Maghreb. One of the main reasons for the defeat of the Portuguese troops was the rise in the water Loukkos River during the battle. As a result of this battle, Portugal lost its status as a great power.

In 1970 Thor Heyerdahl visited Loukkos River estuary, and studied the reed boats, manufactured by local fishermen in his plans to sail "Ra II. According to Heyerdahl ancient Phoenician and Egyptian sailors who became the founders of Mesoamerican cultures. set out from somewhere like the Lukkus.

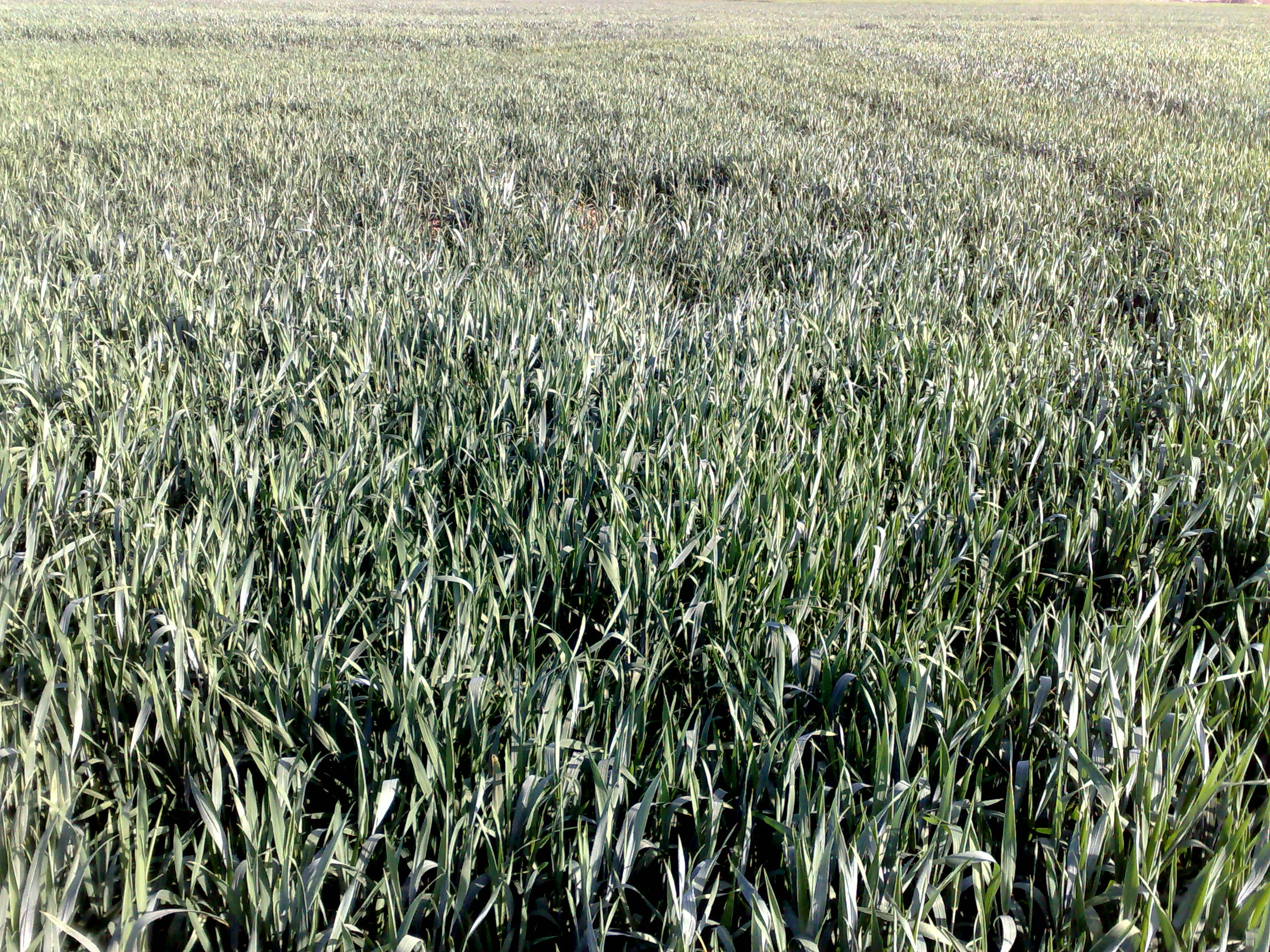
Grand Palace basin.

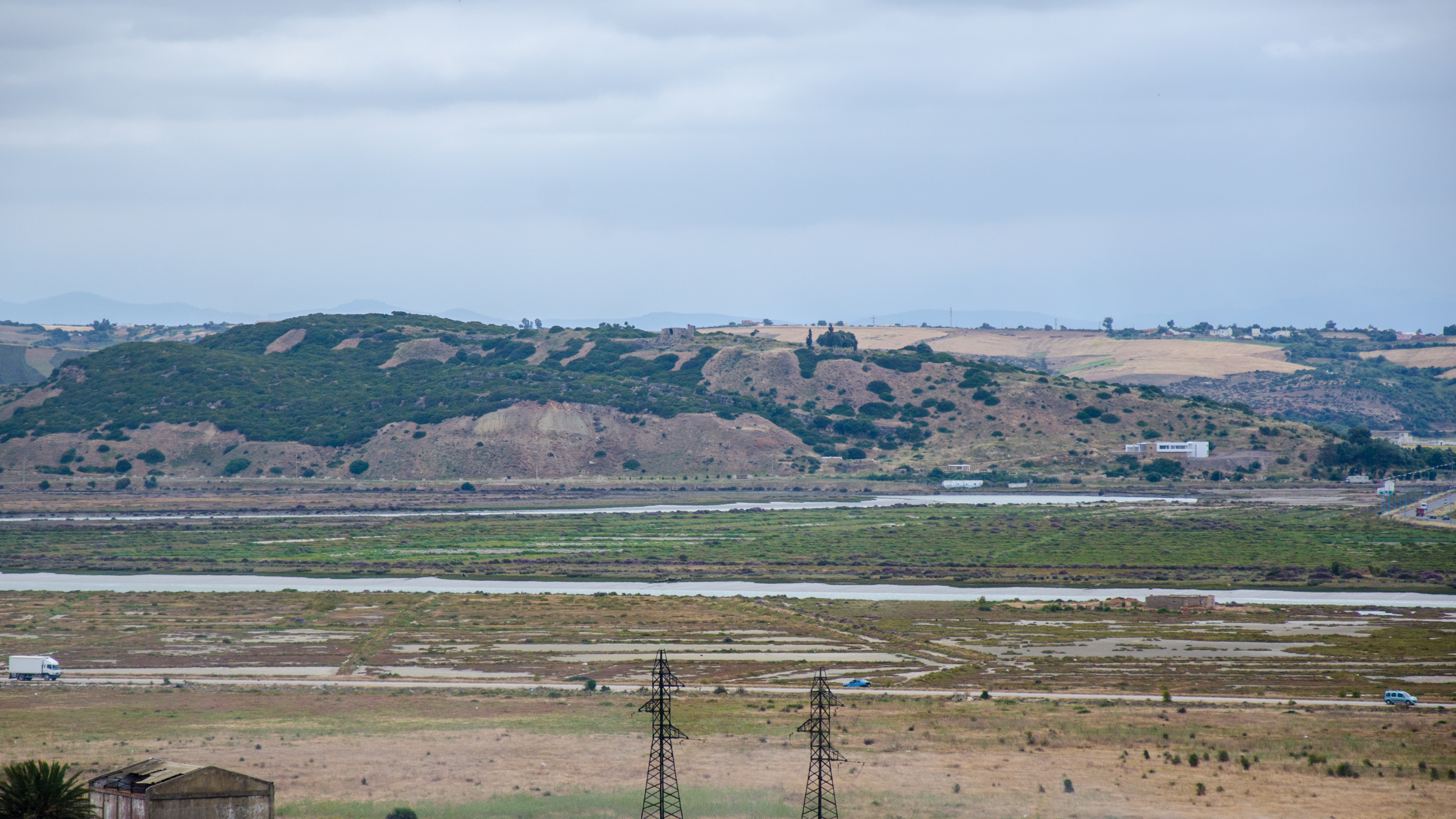
the site of Lixus

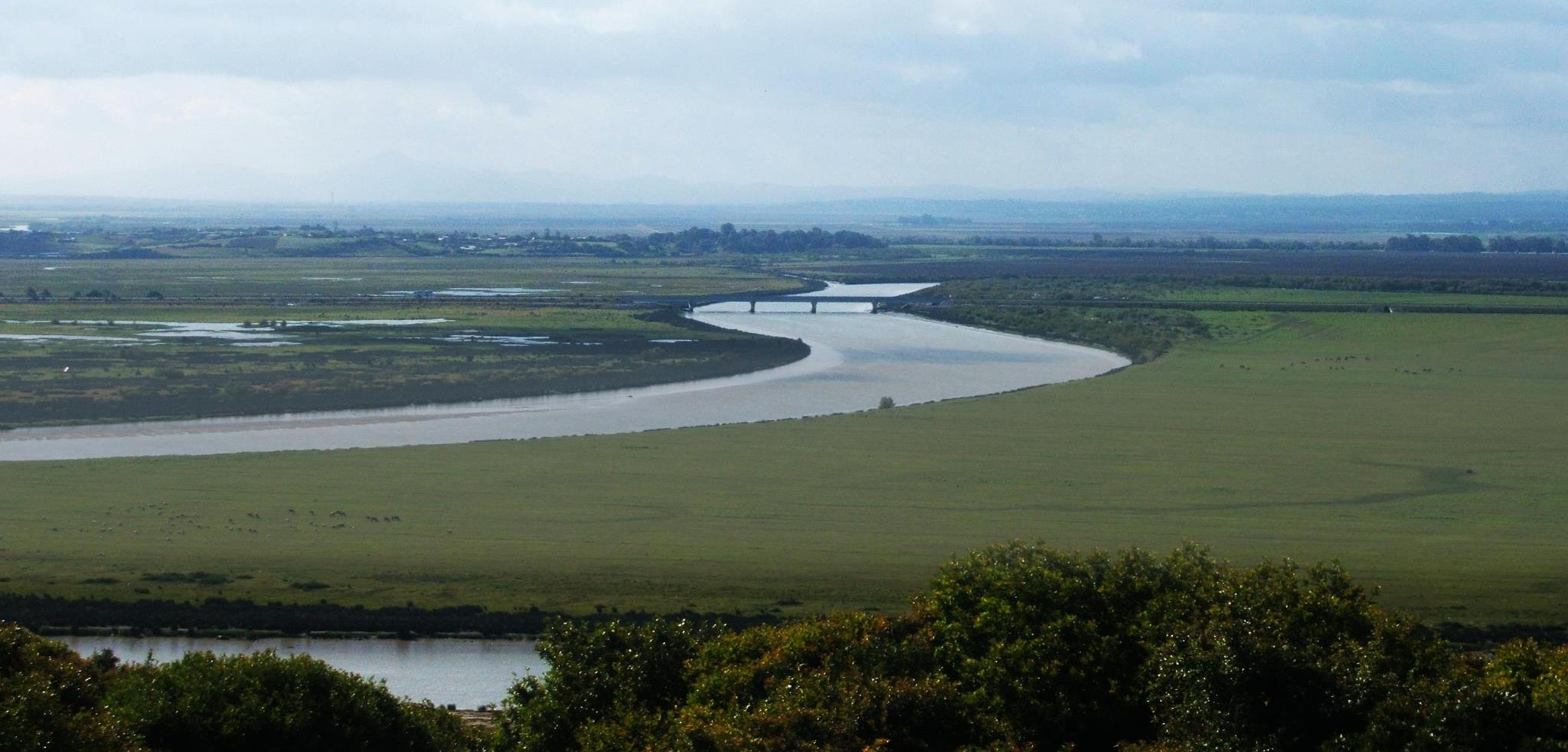
Larache at the mouth of the Oued Loukous.

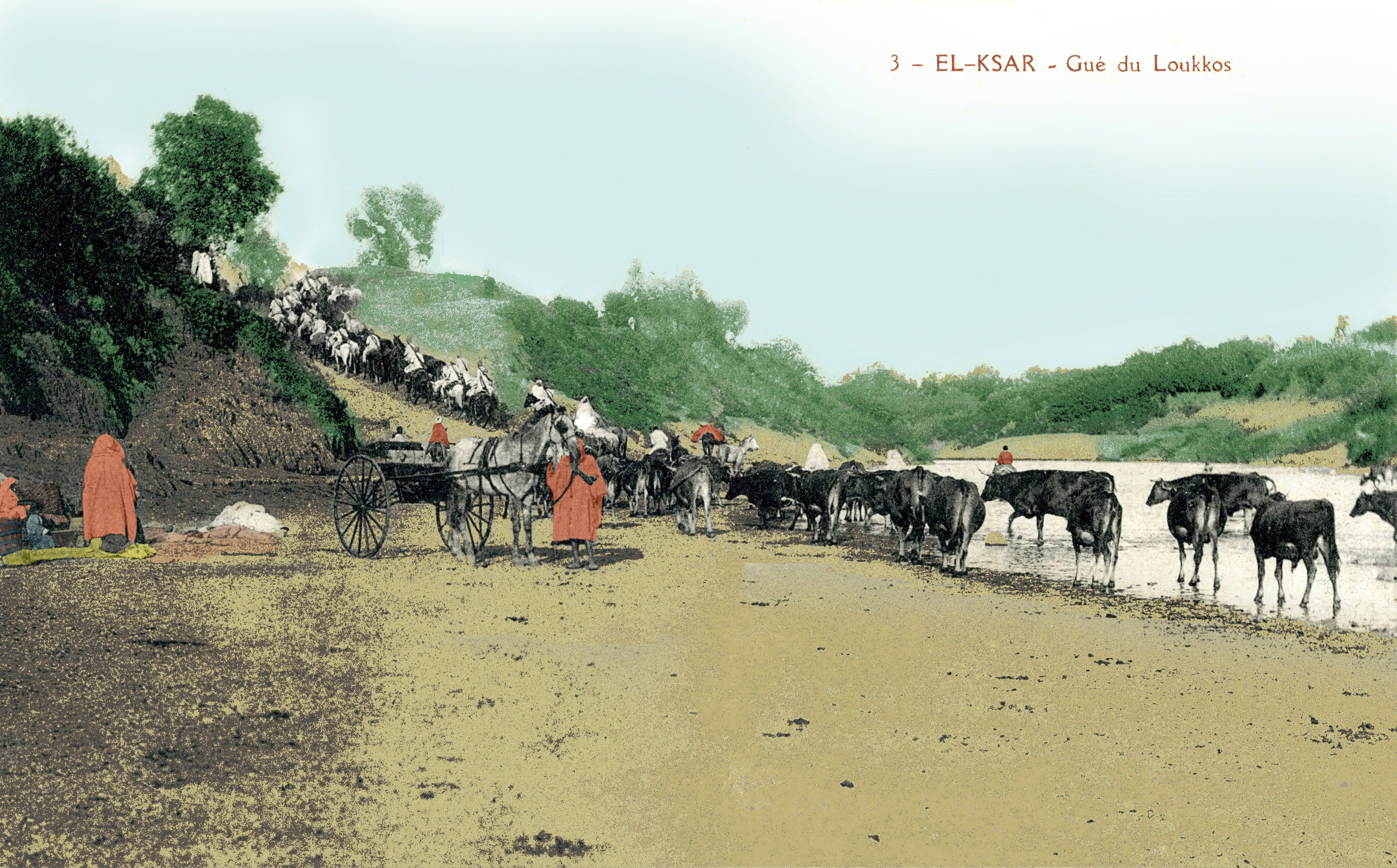
El Ksar 1900
