= Ottoman wars in Africa =

Series of military conflicts between the Ottoman Empire and various African states

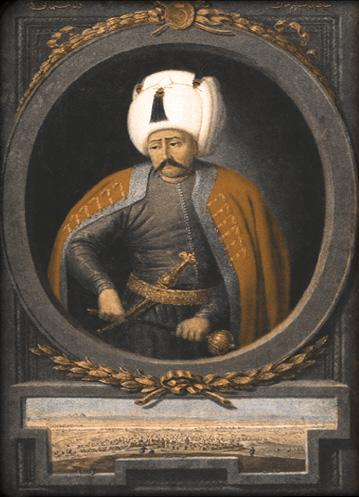
Selim I

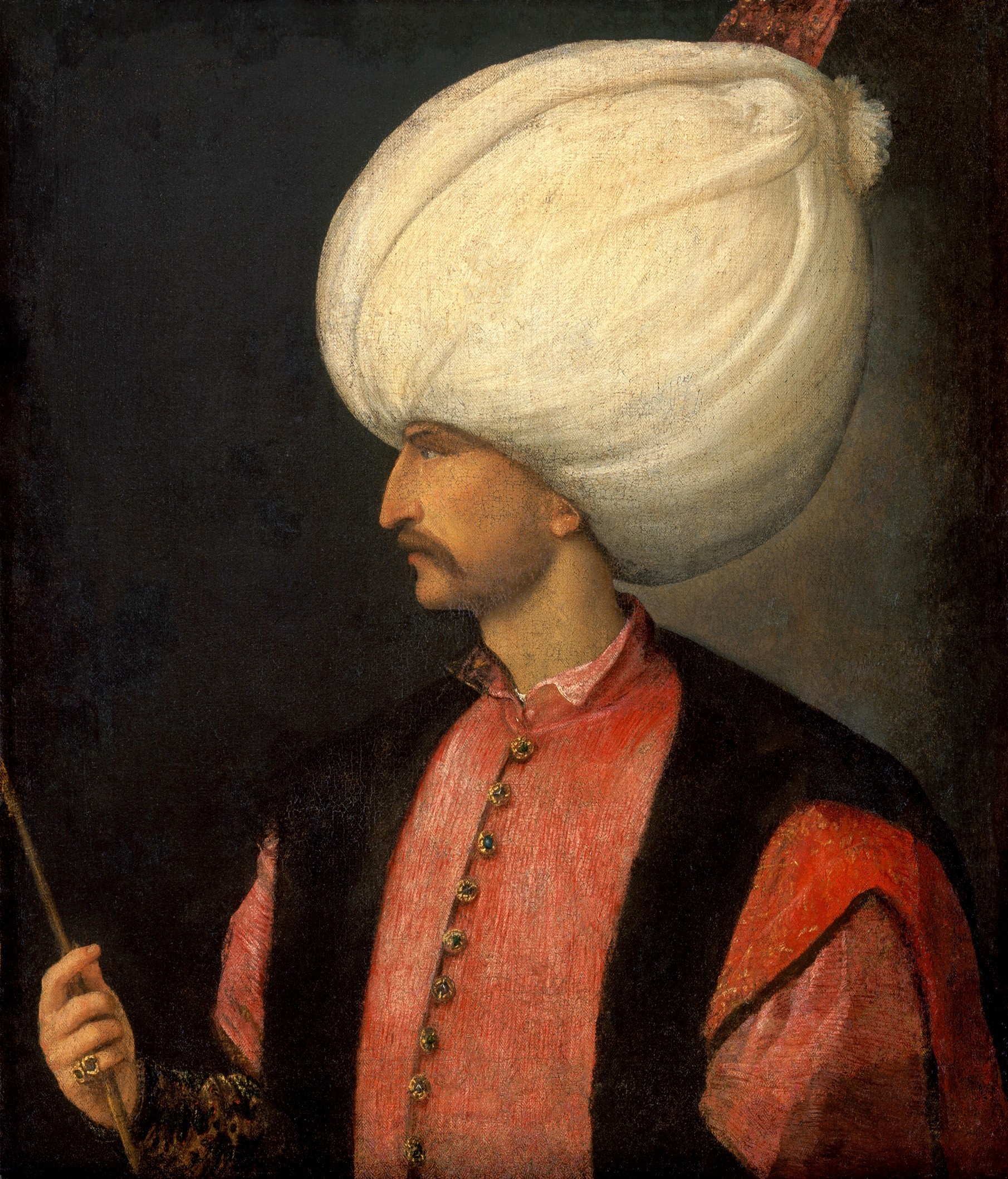
Suleiman I

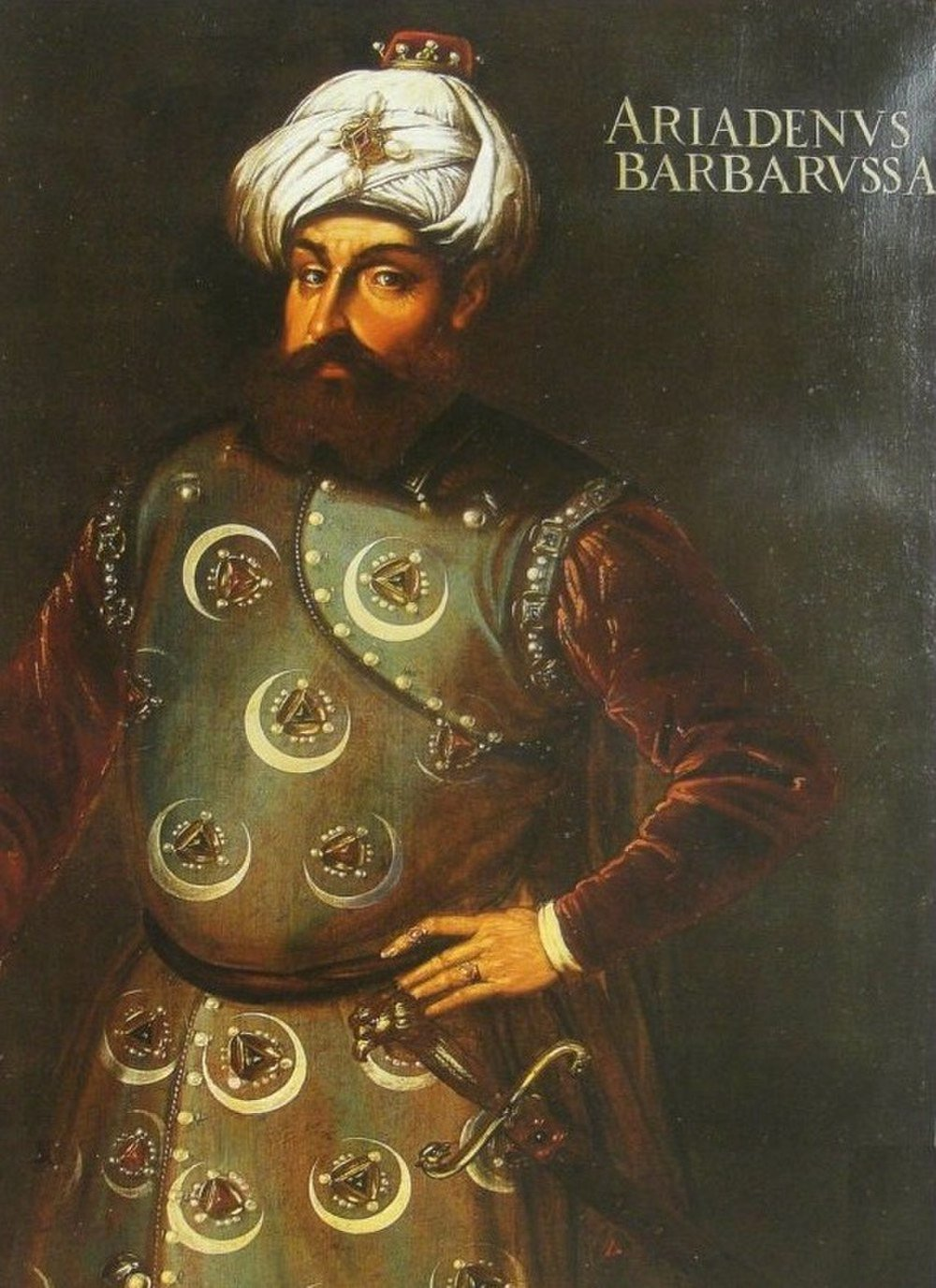
Hayreddin Barbarossa

The Ottoman Empire was founded at the beginning of the 14th century. Beginning in the 16th century, it also began acquiring possessions following series of wars in coastal North Africa.

== Egypt ==
Egypt was under the rule of a Mamluk Sultanate led by Circassians and Kipchak Turks, and who also ruled Syria, Palestine, Lebanon and Jordan. After Mehmed II (the Conqueror) united most of Anatolia under Ottoman rule, the two empires became neighbours of each other where two Mamluk vassals of Turkmen origin were the buffer states between the two. During the Ottoman-Safavid Persia war, Mamluks (or their vassals) supported Persia. Selim I (the Grim) of the Ottoman Empire used this claim as a pretext to wage a war on Mamluks. During Selim's long campaign to Egypt in 1516–18, Mamluks were defeated three times; in the battles Marj Dabiq and Yaunis Khan on the way to Egypt and in the Battle of Ridanieh in Egypt (The first and the third personally commanded by Selim and the second by Hadim Sinan Pasha), the grand vizier. The third battle in which Hadim Sinan Pasha fell was the final blow to Mamluks. After clashes in Cairo, the Mamluk sultan Tumanbay II was arrested and Selim annexed the whole Mamluk territory, enlarging the Ottoman Empire more than two times in only two years.

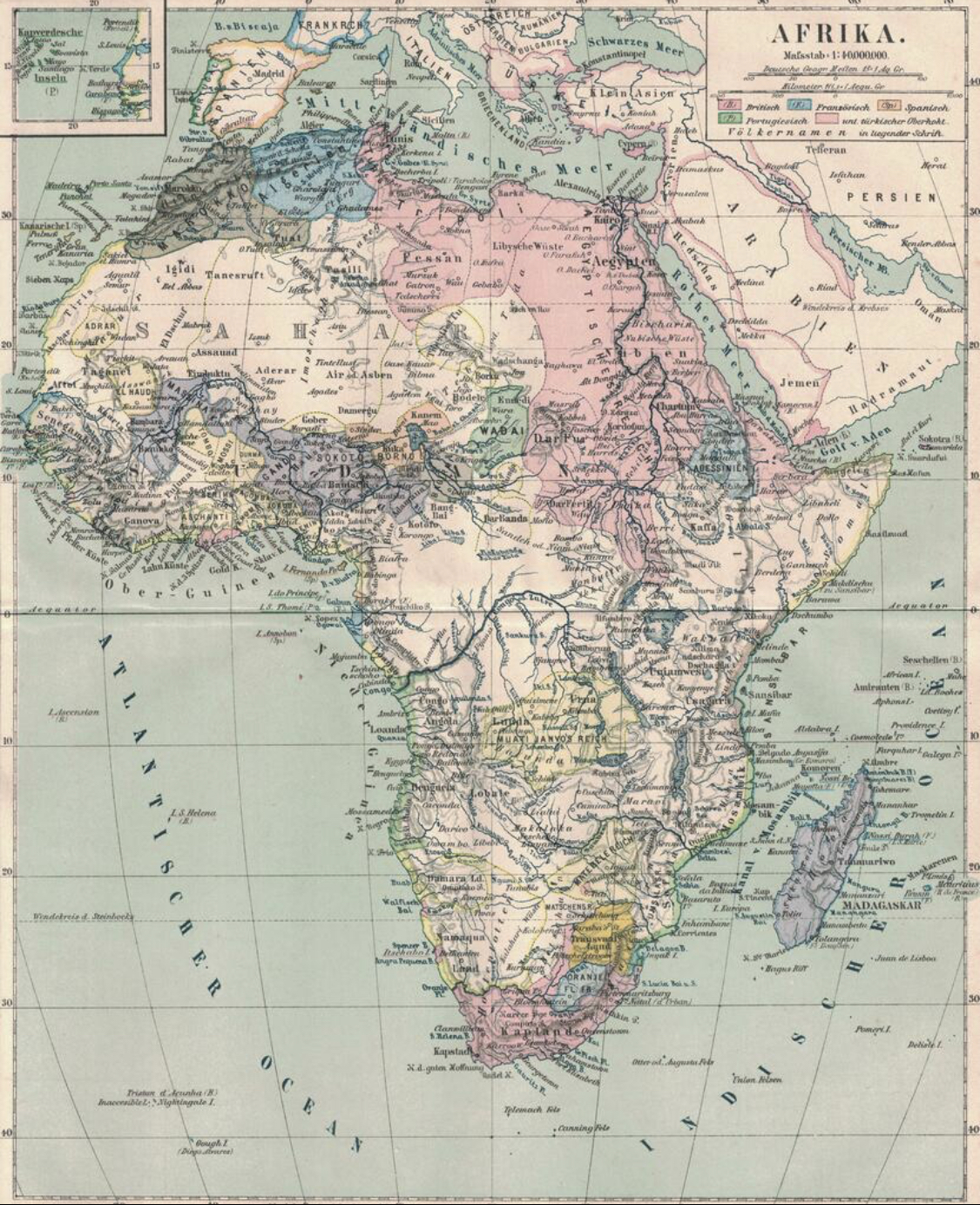
Ottoman possessions in the 19th century

== Algeria ==
Turkish corsair and admiral Hayreddin Barbarossa in 1516, captured the city of Algiers from Charles V. Although initially Barbaros and his brothers were independent, after his elder brother's death, Barbaros appealed to Selim for protection. In 1532, during the reign of Suleiman I (the Magnificent), Barbaros was appointed as the grand admiral of the Ottoman Navy and Algeria became an Ottoman possession. Eventually the Ottomans began controlling the hinterland also. In 1552, Salih Reis an Ottoman admiral, marched over the Sahara and captured Touggourt.

== Tunisia ==
In the early years of the 16th century Tunisia was ruled by Hafsid dynasty of Berber origin. Although Tunis, the most important city of Tunisia was captured by Barbaros on behalf of the Ottoman Empire in 1534, next year during the reign of Charles V, a navy of the Holy Roman Empire took the city. In the year 1560, an Ottoman navy commanded by Piyale Pasha defeated a large navy of the Holy Roman Empire in the Battle of Djerba. After this battle Uluç Ali Reis of the Ottoman Empire captured the city for the second time in 1569 during the reign of Selim II. Two years later the city was lost to the Holy Roman Empire for the second time. Finally in 1574, an Ottoman navy commanded by the grand admiral Sinan Pasha captured the city for the third time.

== The Sahara Desert ==
The first Ottoman expansion into the Sahara desert. Happened in 1574 during the time of Sultan Murad III. when an elderly Officer, named Mahmut bey, led from Tunis to conquer the large parts of the Southern Saharan desert, including portions of present-day Niger, and Chad. Mahmut Bey also conquered the Awlad Muhammad, Where he resumed control, and later on reached the south of Lake Chad, and established his governorate to the borders of Kanem-Bornu.

1875, a war between the Haggars and the Azgars took place. The Pasha of Fezzan, Ali Mehmed and Derviş Pasha, Wanted too take advantage of this situation. Decided too annex the Ezgar Tevârik region, which was brought under Ottoman rule without bloodshed. Later the French, trying to occupying the Tuareg, kept on claiming the Janet district which later was transformed into an independent sub-district under the name Azgar-Tuareg. The Tuaregs of the Sahara desert, pledging allegiance to the ottomans and demanded to be placed under the Turkish suzerainty.Ottomans. thus the sahara Desert, became closer to the Ottoman Empire with loyalty, especially in the second half of the 19th century, and their subsequent annexation to the Fezzan Sanjak But not only the Tuaregs demanded Ottoman protection. Wadai sultanate, Tibesti and Tîbûs all sent representatives to the Ottoman province of Trablusgarp in the 1880s. The leaders personally Demanded protection of the Ottomans against the French colonialism, that had spread into the region of lake chad. The sultanate's came under Ottoman protection but it was hard to maintain due to its distance. Not only that the Tuareg Confederation and Kel Ahaggar located in the central Sahara, had semi-vassal relations with the Ottoman Tripolitania and paid tribute or acknowledged their authority intermittently. In 1875, the Ottoman Empire incorporated the Oasis of Ghat, who had previously sought to join Ottoman subjects three times, into its territory against the French threat and established a district centered in Ghat.

== Libya ==
After Knights Hospitaller left the island of Rhodes in 1522, some of them had settled in Tripoli, the most important city of Libya. In 1551, Ottoman admiral Turgut Reis (also known as Dragut) captured the city with the help of Sinan Pasha. Eventually Benghazi was annexed and influence came towards the hinterland in the direction of Fezzan. Between 1711 and 1835 Libya became autonomous under Karamanlı dynasty (a dynasty founded by a military ruler from Karaman, Turkey). After 1835 Mahmud II reestablished Ottoman control.

== Horn and East of Africa ==
In 1538, Suleiman I sent a navy to the Indian Ocean. (see Ottoman naval expeditions in the Indian Ocean). The expeditions continued for about 30 years. Özdemir Pasha, the deputy of the admiral, conquered the west bank of the Red Sea (roughly corresponding to a narrow coastal strip of Sudan and Eritrea) in 1567, during the reign of Selim II. In the late 16th century Ottoman Admiral Ali Bey established Ottoman supremacy in many cities of the Swahili coast between Mogadishu and Kilwa. The Ottoman invasion of the Ethiopian Empire was crushed by the Emperor Sarsa Dengel at the battle of Addi Qarro, where the Ottoman commander Ahmad Pasha was killed. Mogadishu recognised Ottoman suzerainty in 1585, and Ali Bey also established Ottoman supremacy in other regions such as Mozambique in East Africa, the Kilve Sultanate in the south of Tanzania, the Mombasa Sultanate on the coast of Kenya, the capital of Somalia, Mogadishu and other cities and their surrounding areas.Brava, Kilifi, Pate, Lamu and Faza. Ethiopia also experienced a brief period of Ottoman domination when the independence of the Emirate of Harar was interrupted by Ottoman-Egyptian rule which resulted in the Emirate of Harar being added as an Ottoman-Egyptian possession until being driven out by the British 10 years later.

== Morocco ==
While it is commonly said the Ottomans never conquered Morocco, this ignores important military activities in 1554, 1558 and 1576 where Ottoman-aligned forces captured Fez and wielded a certain degree of temporary political authority. In the beginning of 1558, Hasan Pasha, the son of Barbarossa and the beylerbey of Algiers, led an Ottoman force into Morocco and fought against the Saadian sultan Abdallah al-Ghalib, who was ordered to stop him, at the battle of Wadi al-Laban, near Fes. The engagement took place on a tributary of the Sebou River and the result was inconclusive. Hasan Pasha, on fearing a Spanish counter-attack from Oran, retreat and his forces re-embarked at Qassasa. Though the Ottomans avoided a rout, Moroccan sources credit al-Ghalib with forcing the withdrawal, effectively halting further Ottoman advance into the region. Earlier, in 1554, the Wattasid ruler Ali Abu Hassun, who had pledged allegiance to the Ottoman Empire, entered Morocco with a force led by Salah Rais. After defeating the Saadians at the Battle of Tadla, they captured Fez and briefly restored Wattasid rule under Ottoman suzerainty. However, later that same year, the Saadian Sultan Mohammed ash-Sheikh retook the city, ending the short-lived occupation. A final significant episode occurred in 1576, when the exiled Saadian prince Abu Abdallah Mohammed II (al-Mutawakkil) sought support from the Ottoman Regency of Algiers to reclaim the throne from his uncle, Abd al-Malik. In exchange for Ottoman backing, he accepted vassalage. The Ottoman commander Ramazan Pasha led a substantial expedition into Morocco, captured Fez, and installed Abu Abdallah as a client ruler. However, internal Saadian conflict culminated in the Battle of Ksar el-Kebir in 1578, where Abd al-Malik, al-Mutawakkil, and the Portuguese king Sebastian I all perished. Following the battle, Morocco came under the control of Ahmad al-Mansur, who reasserted independence and distanced the kingdom from Ottoman influence. In addition, the Regency of Algiers briefly occupied the eastern Moroccan city of Oujda between 1792 and 1795, marking another short-lived extension of Ottoman authority in Moroccan territory. While Morocco was never formally incorporated into the Ottoman Empire as a province, these episodes illustrate that the Ottomans did, at several points, occupy key Moroccan cities, install or support local rulers, and temporarily impose vassalage, demonstrating that their influence extended into Morocco more significantly than sometimes acknowledged.

== Napoleon's campaign in Egypt ==
General Napoleon Bonaparte (later Napoleon I) of France invaded Egypt in 1798. The main Ottoman army was preoccupied in European fronts and the only defenders were local forces which were routed in the Battle of Pyramids. However Napoleon couldn't proceed much because his fleet was defeated by the British navy. In 1799 he returned and the French army evacuated Egypt following the Battle of Alexandria in 1801.

== Loss of territories ==
The Ottoman Empire lost direct control of Egypt and the lands to the south during the revolt of Kavalalı Mehmet Ali Pasha in the 1830s. Although Egypt was still considered an Ottoman vassal, the Ottoman Empire totally lost control in the 1880s to the British Empire. By the 19th century, Ottoman control of the countries west of Egypt was also weakened. Algeria was lost in 1830 and Tunis was lost in 1881, both to France. Libya, the last Ottoman territory in Africa was lost to Italy at the end of the Italo-Turkish War in 1911.

== See also ==
- List of wars involving the Ottoman Empire
- Ottoman wars in Europe
- Ottoman wars in Asia
- Military of the Ottoman Empire

== Sources ==
- Nicolae Jorga (2009). Geschichte des Osmanischen Reiches. trans by Nilüfer Epçeli. Istanbul: Yeditepe yayınları. ISBN 978-975-6480-18-2.
- Gábor Ágoston; Bruce Masters (2009). Encyclopaedia of the Ottoman Empire. Facts On File. p. 650. ISBN 978-0-8160-6259-1.
- Lord Kinross (2008). The Ottoman Centuries. trans by Meral Gaspıralı. Istanbul: Altın Kitaplar. ISBN 978-975-21-0955-1.
- Yaşar Yücel-Ali Sevim (1990). Türkiye Tarihi (History of Turkey). Vol II. Istanbul: AKDTYK Yaynları. ISBN 975-160-25-99.
- Stanford Shaw (1976). History of the Ottoman Empire and Modern Turkey. Vol I. Cambridge University Press. ISBN 0-521-21280-4.
