= Sahaba al-Rehmania =

Wife of the Moroccan sultan Mohammed al-Shaykh

Sahaba al-Rehmania صحابة الرحمانية
- Spouse: Mohammed al-Shaykh
- Issue: Abd al-Mumin al-Saadi; Aisha al-Saadiya; Fatima Zahra al-Saadiya; Abu Marwan Abd al-Malik I Saadi
- House: Saadi dynasty (by marriage)
- Religion: Islam

Sahaba el-Rehmania (Arabic: سحابة الرحمانية; m. c. 1528 / 934–5 AH) was the wife of the Saadi Sultan Mohammed al-Shaykh and the mother of Abu Marwan Abd al-Malik. Gifted in diplomacy, she held a leading political role throughout her life. She was ambassador to the Ottoman Empire at the court of Sultan Murad III.

== Biography ==
Sahaba comes from the Rahamna tribe, a Ḥassān tribe. Her tribe was allied with the Saadians and, in 1525, they participated in the attack on the Portuguese fortress of Santa Cruz, in Agadir. She married Mohammed al-Shaykh around 1528.

In 1557, upon the accession to the throne of Abdallah al-Ghalib, part of his family including his brothers from his two step-mothers Sahaba and Lalla Masuda went into exile, fearing for their lives. This exile lasted eighteen years. Sahaba and the Saadian princes first went into exile in Tlemcen before reaching Algiers, part of the Ottoman Empire. During their exile in several cities of the Ottoman Empire, Sahaba el-Rehmania ensured that the two brothers Abd al-Malik, barely fifteen years old, and Ahmad, his younger half-brother, completed their education. She also ensured that they integrated into the Ottoman court, without forgetting their heritage and their personal political history. When Abdullah el-Ghalib died in 1574, his son Abu Abdallah Mohammed II ascended the throne. However, according to the succession plan drawn up by Mohammed al-Shaykh, it is the half-brother of Abdallah el-Ghalib, Abdelmalik son of Sahaba, who should have ascended the throne.

With her son she conceived the project of seeking a political alliance and military support to regain the power that is their due. Sahaba and Abdelmalik went to Istanbul to address the Ottoman sultan, Mourad III newly ascended to the throne. Indeed, Sahaba was a friend of Nurbanu Sultan, the widow of Selim II and the mother of Sultan Murad III. Abdelmalik strongly insisted on this sovereign to obtain that he put at his disposal a Turkish army with which he would go to Morocco to strip his nephew of the crown. Murad III received this proposal with anger and refused to favor such a design. However, Sahaba and her son Abdelmalik remained in the Ottoman capital until they found a solution to this problem. A solution quickly presented itself, that same year, in 1574, the Ottoman sultan fought against the Spanish occupiers to regain control of Tunisia. He sent missives to his governors in Algiers and Tripoli ordering them to dispatch ships that could support him in this conflict. The two Saadian brothers Abdelmalik and Ahmad also decided to participate in the sultan's defensive operation by leading one of the ships leaving Algiers. Tunisia was reconquered, and Sahaba was the first to be aware of the Ottoman victory against the Spanish and was in turn the first to announce this victory to the Ottoman sultan. Fine diplomat, bringing the message of victory over the Spanish, to which his son contributed, she asked simultaneously that the latter support Abdelmalik in his struggle for power against Abu Abdallah Mohammed II. Without hesitation, this time, the Ottoman sultan ordered his governor of Algiers to equip Abdelmalek with men and horses.

The sultan having granted this request, Sahaba and her son Abdelmalik, went back to Algiers where his son gave the inhabitants of this city the letter in which the sultan ordered them to leave with him, and help him reconquer the throne. The Algerians asked Abdelmalik to pay them their balance, he asked them to give him credit until the expedition was completed, but it was agreed that he give, at each stage, a sum of 10,000 coins to the Turkish army which he took with him and which consisted of 4000 men. According to the Dorret commentary, Abdelmalek would have asked the Bey of Algiers for only a weak escort to accompany him to the Moroccan border, request to which the Bey acceded. After which Abdelmalik overthrew his nephew in 1576 and was proclaimed sultan of Morocco.

== Descendants ==
Sahaba and Mohammed al-Shaykh had several children:

- Abd al-Mumin al-Sâadi; he was assassinated in Tlemcen in 1572. He married the Sayyida Oum Daoud al-Ghâzi of Tidli. Their child is Prince Daoud al-Saadi;
- Lalla Aicha al-Sâadiya, born in 1533;
- Lalla Fatima Zahra al-Sâadiya, born 1537. She is buried at the Saadian Tombs in Marrakesh;
- Sultan Abu Marwan Abd al-Malik; he married Zahara bint Agi Morato the daughter of Haci Murad the Ottoman governor of Médéa. After the death of her husband during the Battle of Alcácer Quibir, Zahara remarried Hassan Pasha, governor general of Algeria and then Kapudan Pasha.
