= Siege of Mazagan (1562) =

16th c. military action

Coordinates: 33°14′N 8°30′W

Great Siege of Mazagan
- Part of the Moroccan–Portuguese conflicts
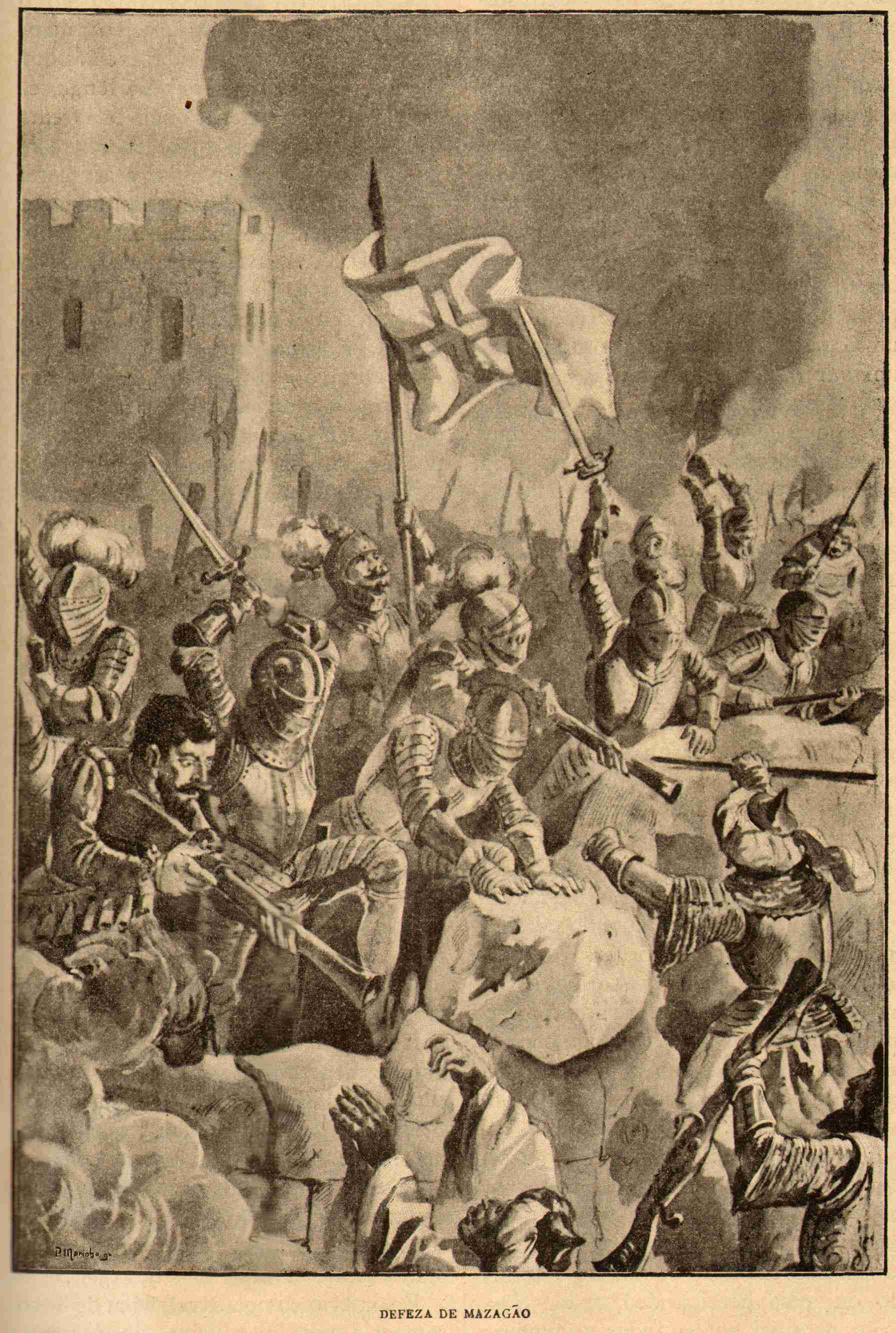
- Defesa de Mazagão, illustration by Roque Gameiro in História de Portugal, Popular e Ilustrada, volume 4
Date	18 February – 7 May 1562
Location	Mazagan, present-day Morocco
Result	Portuguese victory

Belligerents
Kingdom of Portugal	Saadi Sultanate

Commanders and leaders
(Kingdom of Portugal) Rui de Sousa de Carvalho (Kingdom of Portugal) Álvaro de Carvalho	Abu Abdallah Mohammed II Saadi

Strength
About 2,800 soldiers	85,000–120,000 men 24 cannons

Casualties and losses
117 killed 270 wounded	More than 25,000 killed

The siege of Mazagan of 1562, also known as the Great Siege of Mazagan (Portuguese: Grande Cerco de Mazagão) was an armed engagement that took place in the modern city of El Jadida, then known as Mazagan, between Portuguese forces and those of the Saadi dynasty, which had unified Morocco a few years prior.

The Moroccans ultimately failed to breach the defenses of the city, and in the face of continuous Portuguese reinforcements and vigorous defence were forced to withdraw after a two and a half month long siege. It was one of the hardest fought sieges withstood by the Portuguese at Mazagan, of a total of nine.

== Context ==
The Portuguese built a citadel at the accessible harbour of Mazagan in the summer of 1514. This citadel was a rectangular building with four towers, one of which was the old tower that already stood here. The architects were two brothers, Diego and Francisco de Arruda. The location then became known in the Portuguese language as Mazagão. During the next few decades the Sa'dids rose to power and began expelling the Portuguese from their coastal fortresses, with the most significant event being their expulsion from Santa Cruz (present-day Agadir) in 1541. In response, the Portuguese king John III ordered the evacuation of Portuguese positions at Azemmour and Safi and concentrated on building a more defensible position at Mazagão instead. As a result, the Portuguese fortification was expanded into the larger walled fortress we see today in 1541. The fort had 69 embrasures for the placement of guns, and a wide moat furnished with locks that kept it filled with sea water during low tide.

Morocco had been unified by Mohammed al-Shaykh in 1549. His son, Abdallah al-Ghalib succeeded him on the throne in 1557, and in 1559 began planning to capture the heavily fortified Portuguese city of Mazagan on the western Moroccan coast. Preparations continued throughout 1560 and 1561.

The Portuguese governor of the stronghold Álvaro de Carvalho was then in Lisbon. Suspecting an impending attack, his second-in-command Rui de Sousa de Carvalho dispatched a spy to Fez, who confirmed the rumours of the Sultan's preparations. He then dispatched a ship with a distress call to Portugal, then ruled by the regent Dona Catarina, warning of the impending siege and that the town's garrison and residents would not be able to hold out without aid.

== Siege ==
The first of the Sultan's commanders to arrive with a contingent of troops was the qaid of Azzemmour, who pitched his camp half a league away from Mazagan on 18 February 1562, and directly warned Carvalho through an alfaqueque (negotiator of captives) that the Sultan would soon be upon the stronghold; Carvalho dispatched a reply in which he stated: "May he come as fast as he can, because I had been waiting for him in this fortress with plenty of quinces, pears and pomegranates and other such fruits which were not lacking in this fortress."

In Portugal, the regent queen Dona Catarina had been pondering to abandon Mazagan that same year. News of the siege on Mazagan provoked a wave of patriotic sentiment across Portugal as soon as they reached the country, and before Dona Catarina had made any decision with regards to relieving the fort, a large number of volunteers among nobles, commoners and clergymen took the initiative of arming themselves and sailing out in the aid of the beleaguered fortress. Some town halls in the southernmost Portuguese region of Algarve, such as Tavira, covered the costs of transporting volunteers across the Atlantic onto Morocco, while townsmen would provide their own vessels for the purpose. 100 volunteers sailed from Lagos, while the fishermen of Lagos, Tavira and Faro provided a further 40 volunteers.

The prince-heir of Morocco Abu Abdallah Mohammed II Saadi ("Muley Hamet" in Portuguese) arrived on 4 March with the bulk of his army, which according to Portuguese estimates surpassed 100,000 men.

The Moroccans first dug a trench in the direction of the fortress, and when they were 400 paces away erected an earthen bulwark from which they could bombard the Santo Espírito bastion. A trench or moat was also dug surrounding the fortress on the landside.

On 24 March, captain Álvaro de Carvalho reached Mazagan with a relief force that included 600 well-equipped fidalgos. A relief force of 1,565 volunteers funded at their personal expenses the voyage to Mazagan, which they reached on 26 March after a six-day journey from Lisbon, carrying plentiful supplies.

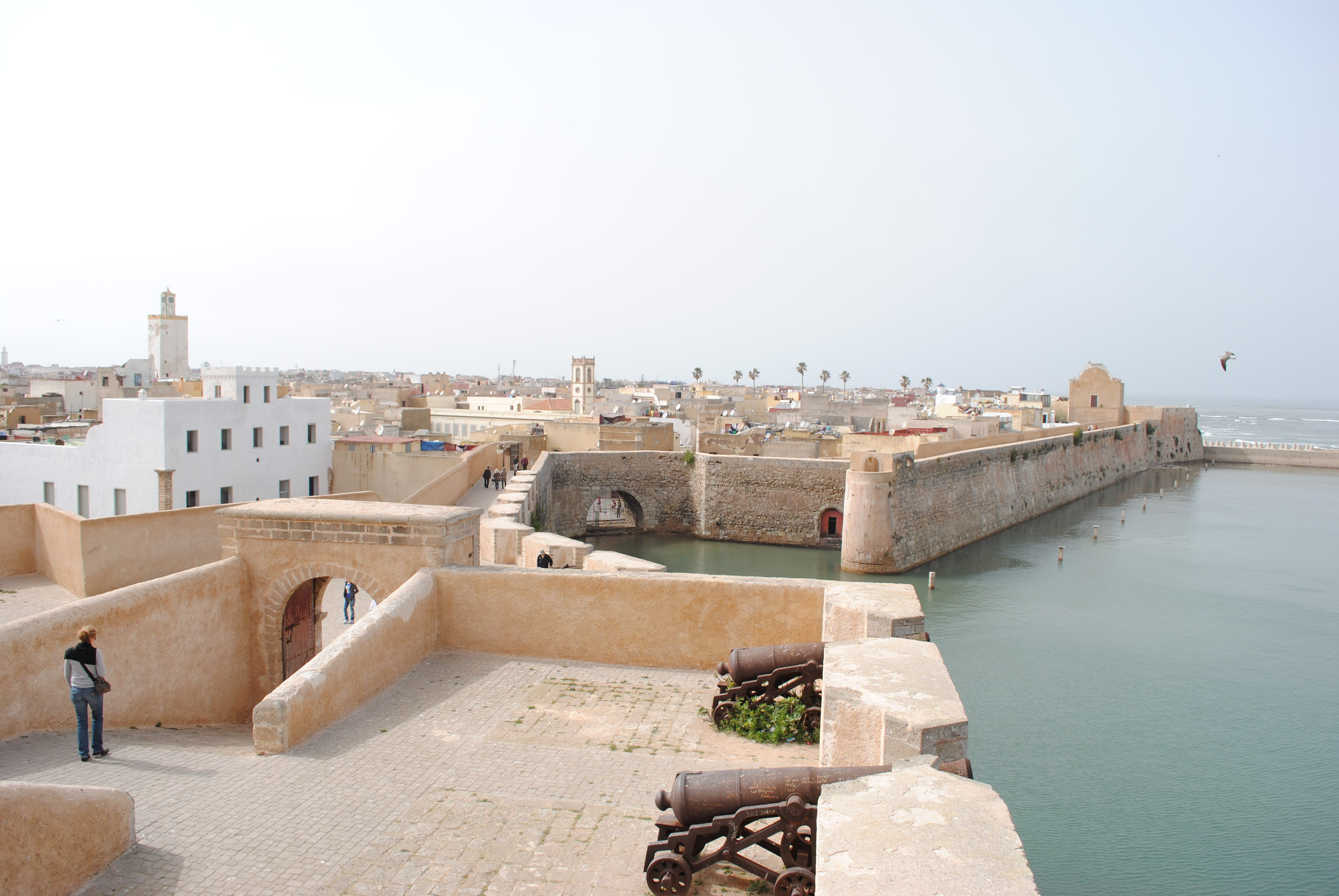
Sea-gate of Mazagan, through which the fortress could be continuously reinforced and supplied via the sea.

Work continued unabated throughout every night: while some men kept watch for scaling ladders, others paid attention to noise below ground that would indicate the approach of a Moroccan mine; others cared for the sick and wounded, prepared supplies, or repaired the holes blasted open by Moroccan artillery. Despite the stress and danger, morale remained high.

A group of 2,000 Portuguese troops, dispatched by the regent, reached the fortress shortly before the first assault by the Muslims, on 24 April.

Reinforcements to the city included the renowned Portuguese engineer Isidoro de Almeida, who oversaw counter-mining operations alongside engineer Francisco da Silva.

On 30 April, a reinforcement of 250 soldiers disembarked shortly before the Moroccans launched a second mass assault, which was also repulsed.

Fighting continued until May 1st. Demoralized by their reverses, running low on ammunition and seeing no way to overcome Portuguese defenses, on May 5 the prince-heir withdrew his army.

== Aftermath ==
Agostinho Gavy de Mendonça, a Mazagan-born resident who later wrote a chronicle of the siege, recorded that 3000 people were to be found in the fort at the end of the siege. He reported that the water cistern held 5500 tons of water at the beginning of the siege, and by the end had lost only a thousand tons of water, despite water having always been distributed generously.

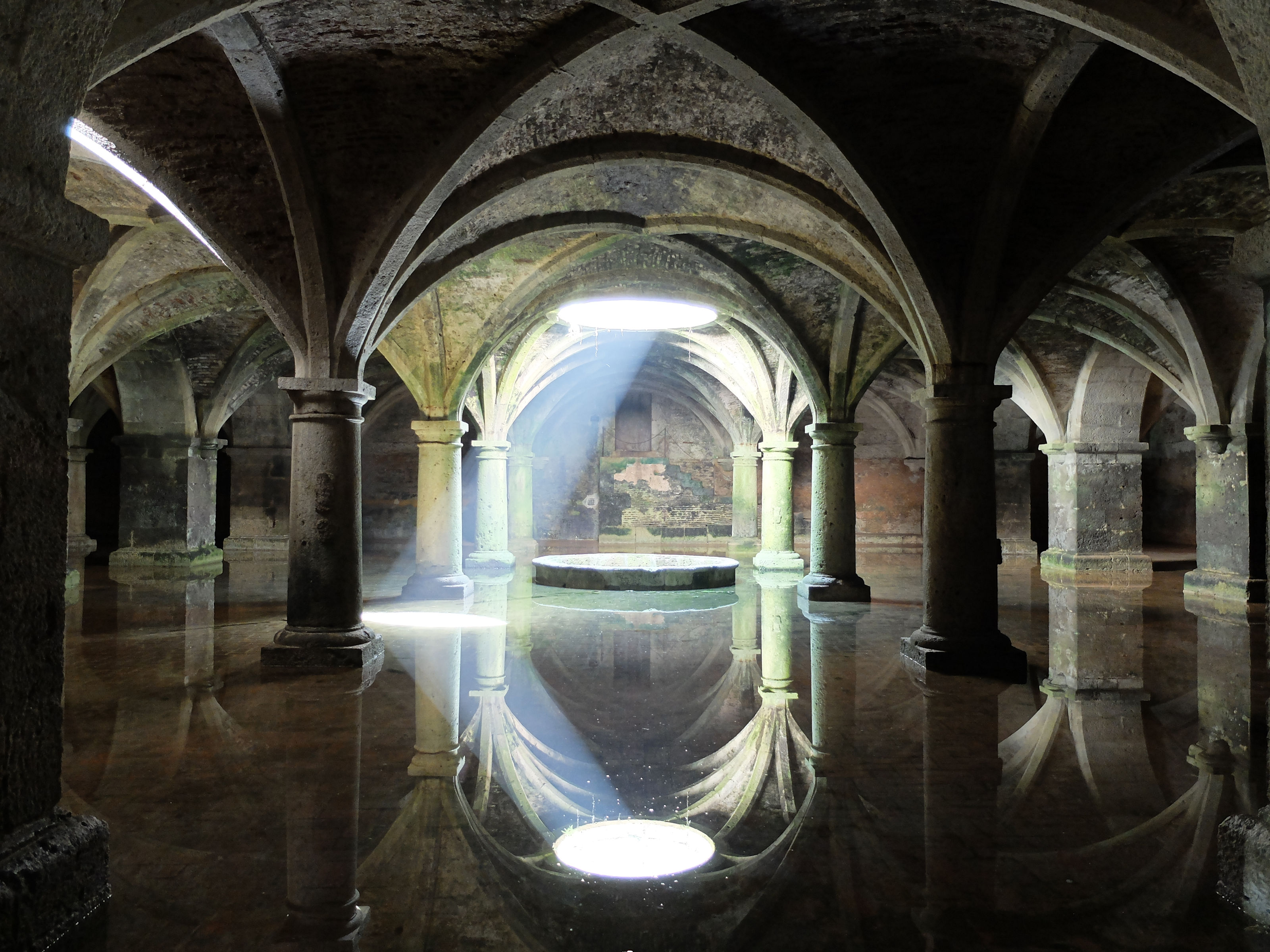
Portuguese cistern of Mazagan.

In total, no less than 20 000 men were mobilized to help the garrison.

Despite having successfully held out in the 1562 siege, the fortified city remained in a state of constant warfare with the Moroccans.

== See also ==
- Conquest of Ceuta
- Battle of Alcácer Quibir
- Portuguese Tangier
