= Muley Xeque =

Moroccan prince (1566–1621)

Muley Xeque (Arabic: مولاي الشيخ Mawlay al-Shaykh; 1566–1621) was a Saadi prince. Exiled in Spain, he converted to Catholicism in Madrid and was known as Felipe de África, Philip of Africa or Philip of Austria, in addition to the nickname "The Black Prince".

== Life ==
He was born in Marrakesh in 1566. He was the son of Saadi Sultan Abdallah Mohammed, who after reigning between 1574 and 1576 was dethroned by his uncle, Abd al-Malik (1576-1578). Aided by Portuguese troops under the command of King Sebastian of Portugal, al-Mutawakkil faced his rival on August 4, 1578 in the Battle of the Three Kings, which resulted in the defeat of the Portuguese and which killed three monarchs, giving way to the reign of Ahmad al-Mansur, the brother of Abd al-Malik.

Muley Xeque arrived to Spain at the age of 12. After a stay in Portugal, he lived in Carmona from 1589 to 1593. According to Lope de Vega, who was his personal friend and whose comedy El bautismo del príncipe de Marruecos is part of what we know about the character, Muley Xeque decided to leave Islam after attending in Andújar to the procession of the Virgen de la Cabeza.

On November 3, 1593 he was baptized in the Monastery of San Lorenzo de El Escorial, sponsored by Philip II, after whom he was named. He was made a grandee of Spain and Commander of the Order of Santiago.

He was well acquainted with Madrid's high society of the time. He lived in a mansion at the corner of Huertas and Príncipe streets (named after him) in the place currently known as Santoña Palace. His friend, Lope de Vega, dedicated his sonnet 148 to him.

Upon the expulsion of the Moriscos, the presence of a former Muslim in the court became uncomfortable, so Muley Xeque moved to the Spanish possessions in Italy. There he died in 1621 in Vigevano, Lombardy, where he was allegedly buried, but his exact resting place is unknown. A chronicler of Vigevano, Matteo di Cherasco Gianolio, picked up the eventful life of Muley Xeque in a book called the Memorie storiche intorno la vita del real principe di Marocco Muley-Xeque, another of the historical sources on the life of this character.

Calle del Príncipe ("Prince Street") in Madrid and Calle Felipe de África in Valdemorillo, where he lived some time before his baptism, are said to be named after him. In Getafe, there is another street of the same name, not about Muley Xeque, but another Moroccan prince who, years later, was baptised with the same name. The Madrid chronicler Mesonero Romanos rejects the claim about Calle del Príncipe, pointing out that the name was already in use in 1568, Muley did not reach Spain until at least 1580 and was not a prince until his baptism in 1593.
