= Capture of Fez =

Capture of Fez may refer to:

- Capture of Fez (1549) by the Saadi Sultanate
- Capture of Fez (1554) by the Ottoman Empire
- Capture of Fez (1576) during a Saadi civil war
