= The Battle of the Three Kings (film) =

1990 film by Souheil Ben-Barka

- Directed by: Souheil Ben-Barka; Uchkun Nazarov
- Written by: Souheil Ben-Barka; Guido Castillo
- Produced by: Alo Khodzhlev; Leo Pescarolo; Jaime Oriol
- Starring: Massimo Ghini; Ángela Molina
- Cinematography: Girolamo La Rosa
- Music by: Anvar Ergashev; Vladimir Martynov
- Release date: 1990
- Language: English

The Battle of the Three Kings (Russian: Битва трёх королей, Italian: La battaglia dei tre tamburi di fuoco, Spanish: La batalla de los tres reyes, also known as Drums of Fire) is a 1990 Soviet-Italian-Spanish-Moroccan historical adventure-drama film directed by Souheil Ben-Barka and Uchkun Nazarov and starring Massimo Ghini and Ángela Molina. It depicts real life events of the Saadi Sultan of Morocco Abd el Malek I.

The film tells the story of the Saadi dynasty prince Abdelmalek, exiled from Morocco by his brothers. Since his exile, he will live twenty adventurous years: fight the Spanish Inquisition, take part in the Battle of Lepanto, be incarcerated in Alicante prison, and assist in the Conquest of Tunis. Eventually, he returns to Morocco to fulfill his destiny.

== Plot ==
=== Episode 1 ===
In 1568, Morocco is liberated from Portuguese rule, but internal conflicts arise among the Arab leaders. Prince Abdelmalek is forced to flee to Ottoman-controlled Algeria. There, he joins maritime raids led by his father-in-law Agat-Mor, delivers weapons to the rebelling Moriscos of Granada, and defends Cyprus from Spanish forces. Captured during one of his missions, Abdelmalek escapes with the help of Genoese merchant Carlo di Palma. In Andalusia, he meets Faiza, the sister of rebel leader Akalay ben-Umayyah. However, Faiza is taken into the harem of the Turkish sultan, where she gains his favor. Despite this, she manages to maintain contact with Abdelmalek during his visits to Istanbul. After Sultan Selim II’s death, Faiza is exiled, cutting off their connection.

=== Episode 2 ===
The Turkish Sultan’s forces drive the Spanish out of Tunisia, after which the Sultan grants Abdelmalek an army to reclaim Morocco. The country’s previous ruler, Mulay Mohammed, flees to Portugal, promising King Sebastian I coastal territories in exchange for military support. Meanwhile, the Turks begin to question Abdelmalek’s loyalty. The Portuguese army lands on Morocco’s shores, capturing several ports. However, the newly established Sultan Abdelmalek skillfully exploits the young King Sebastian's vanity, forcing him into a decisive confrontation. The infamous Battle of the Three Kings ensues, sealing the fate of the region.

== Historical context ==
The movie is loosely based on the real life Battle of the Three Kings on Aug. 4, 1578. King Sebastian of Portugal wanted to convert Muslim Morocco to Christian rule. Allied with the Moroccan sultan, al-Mutawakkil, and his brother Aḥmad. The Muslim forces, though not as well equipped as the Portuguese, outnumbered the Portuguese 5:2 (with 50,000 soldiers and cavalry). The Muslim forces forced the Christians to retreat to Larache on the coast.

== Cast ==
- Massimo Ghini as Abd el Malek
- Ángela Molina as Sophie
- F. Murray Abraham as Osrain
- Ugo Tognazzi as Carlo di Palma
- Fernando Rey as Pope Paul V
- Claudia Cardinale as Roxelane
- Irene Papas as Lalla Sahaba
- Harvey Keitel as Sandobal
- Souad Amidou as Meryem
- Olegar Fedoro as Father Tebaldo
- Joaquín Hinojosa as Akalay
- Sergey Bondarchuk as Selim
- Viktor Korolev as Monelo

== See also ==
- Battle of Ksar El Kebir
