= Battle of Tadla =

Battle in 1554

Coordinates: 32°20′0″N 6°21′0″W

- Part of Conflicts between the Regency of Algiers and Morocco
Date	September 1554
Location	Tadla, Morocco
Result	Saadi victory

Belligerents
Wattasid Dynasty	Saadi Dynasty

Commanders and leaders
Ali Abu Hassun †	Muhammad al-Shaykh

Strength
Unknown	Unknown

Casualties and losses
Unknown	Unknown
- Location of the Battle of Tadla

The Battle of Tadla occurred in September 1554 in Tadla, Morocco, between Ali Abu Hassun, last ruler of the Wattasid dynasty, and Mohammed ash-Sheikh, ruler of the Saadis.

== Background ==
In 1545 the Wattasid ruler in northern Morocco, Abu Hassun, submitted to the Ottoman sultan and declared himself an Ottoman vassal, but the Ottomans were unable to intervene when the Wattasids lost Fez to their southern Saadian rivals under Mohammed ash-Sheikh. Ali Abu Hassun fled to neighbouring Algiers, where he was offered asylum.

Ali Abu Hassun was able with the help of the Ottomans under Salah Rais to reconquer Fes in 1554. Ali Abu-Hassun was put in place as Sultan of Fez and a vassal of the Ottomans supported by the Turkish troops. Ali Abu Hassun soon paid off the Turkish troops, and gave them the base of Peñon de Velez, which the Moroccans had reconquered from Spain in 1522. Upon withdrawal, Salah Reis assured the Saadi ruler that he would grant his enemy Ali Abu Hassun no further assistance.

== Battle ==
Ali Abu Hassun was vanquished and killed by the Saadians at the Battle of Tadla in September 1554 thus bringing an end to the Wattasid dynasty.

Following the battle, Mohammed ash-Sheik was able to enter the city of Fez on 13 September 1554, and became the undisputed ruler of Morocco, establishing the Saadian dynasty as the sole ruler of the country.

== Aftermath ==
The Ottomans reacted by having Mohammed ash-Sheik killed in 1557 by an assassin named Sahil, who brandished an axe and decapitated the Saadi ruler. An attempt to invade the country ensued the following year in the Battle of Wadi al-Laban.
