= Conflicts between the Regency of Algiers and Morocco =

Overview of the conflicts between the Regency of Algiers and Morocco

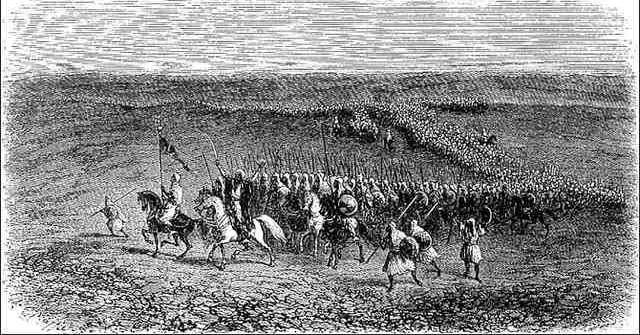
- Troops of the Regency of Algiers, allied to the kingdom of Ait Abbes, march towards Orania
Date	1550–1795
Location	Morocco, Western Algeria

Belligerents
Regency of Algiers; Zayyanids (16th century); Kingdom of Beni Abbas; Kingdom of Kuku	Saadi dynasty (1559–1660); Alaouite dynasty (1559–1795); Spanish Empire

Casualties and losses
Unknown	Unknown

Conflicts between the Regency of Algiers and the Cherifian dynasties or Algerian-Sherifian conflicts opposed the Regency of Algiers and its allied local sultanates and tribal confederations, and on the other hand, the Sharifian Saadian and Alawite dynasties that had ruled Morocco since the 16th century.

The origins of these conflicts were multiple and overlapping. The integration in 1520 into the Ottoman Empire of the state-owned enterprise of the Regency of Algiers in the central Maghreb as a new political center integrated into was at the expense of the Zayyanids of Tlemcen to its west. Recurrent conflicts at the beginning of the sixteenth century with the Regency on the one hand and the Spaniards on the other saw Tlemcen absorbed into the Regency. The weakening of the Zianides, aroused the covetousness of the Saadians who saw in it the opportunity to expand their territories to the East. Although the Regency of Algiers confirmed its control over Tlemcen and Orania, it did not have the means to launch long campaigns in the Sahara, which it delegated to various tribal confederations like the Ouled Sidi Cheikh. The Saadians were blocked to the north by the Spanish Empire but the Regency of Algiers then found a south-Saharan outlet for imperial expansion.

These conflicts and resulting treaties foreshadowed the borders and delimitations of the modern nation-states of the Maghreb.

== Establishment of the regency of Algiers (16th century) ==
=== Collapse of the Zayyanids of Tlemcen ===
The weakening of the Zayyanids of Tlemcen, playing on their alliances with Spain, the Turks of Algiers and the Wattasids to maintain themselves, opened up a political void in western Algeria. The founding of the Regency of Algiers (1512–1529) then its integration into the Ottoman Empire was done at the expense of the Zayyanids in the west and the Hafsids in the east. The regency of Algiers, directed by the exogenous Turkish element of its militia, extended its influence to the west through the play of maraboutic alliances and brotherhoods. However, the advent of the Sharifian Saadians in Fez in 1550 upset this game of alliances. The Regency of Algiers could not count on the support of maraboutics against sovereigns claiming descent from Muhammad. Negotiations therefore began concerning the territories formerly under Zayyanid suzerainty, which were not successful.

=== Saadian attempts in Oran ===
In 1545, the Saadians allied themselves with the Spaniards. The Cherifian army took Tlemcen without fighting in 1550 and marched on Algiers. The beylerbeys of the Regency of Algiers and the Sultan of the Beni Abbas then concluded the pact of Aguemoun Ath Khiar. They retook Orania and Tlemcen in 1551; The victory was exploited politically by Algiers and played a role in the formation of Algeria (prefiguring its borders). This conflict opened a period of Algerian-Cherifian hostility which only ceased in 1585 with the intervention of the Ottoman sultan. From then on, for about a century, the border at the Moulouya river was respected.

On the other hand, the fall of the Zayyanids of Tlemcen opened the way for the Saharan conquests of the Saadians, who were anxious to control the trans-Saharan trade routes that had been left vacant. The Regency could not engage in distant Saharan expeditions, but troops were sent from Algiers to the Gourara towards the end of the 16th century at the request of Ksourians facing rezzous from Tafilalt. The Touat and the Gourara were then subjected to a temptation of local withdrawal and were independent in fact.

== Notable battles ==
- Campaign of Tlemcen (1551)
- Capture of Fez (1554)
- Campaign of Tlemcen (1557)
- Battle of Wadi al-Laban (1558)
- Capture of Fez (1576)
- Battle of Moulouya (1692)
- Siege of Oran (1693)
- Battle of Tlemcen (1700)
- Battle of Chelif (1701)
- Oran expedition (1707)
- Laghouat Expedition (1708–1713)
- Capture of the Rif (1792)

== Bibliography ==
- Bellil, Rachid (1999). Les oasis du Gourara (Sahara algérien) (in French). Peeters Publishers. ISBN 9789042907218.
- Boyer, Pierre (1966). "Contribution à l'étude de la politique religieuse des Turcs dans la Régence d'Alger (XVIe-XIXe siècles)". Revue de l'Occident musulman et de la Méditerranée: Des frontières en Afrique du XII au XX (Histoire et Perception) (in French). 1 (1): 11–49. doi:10.3406/remmm.1966.910.
- Chenntouf, Tayeb (1999). La dynamique de la frontière au Maghreb (in French). UNESCO.
- Cour, Auguste (2004). L'établissement des dynasties des Chérifs au Maroc et leur rivalité avec les Turcs de la Régence d'Alger: 1509–1830 (in French). Editions Bouchène. ISBN 9782912946782.
