= Mesonero =

Mesonero is a Spanish surname. Notable people with the surname include:

- Alejandro Mesonero-Romanos (born 1968), Spanish car designer
- Daniel Mesonero (born 2005), Spanish footballer
- Ramón de Mesonero Romanos (1803–1882), Spanish poet
