= Andrea Gasparo Corso =

16th-century Corsican trader and secret agent

Andrea Gasparo Corso was a Corsican trader and secret agent who worked for the court of the Spanish king Philip II during the 16th century, and was active in the Ottoman Empire Regency of Algiers. He often worked with his brother Francisco Gasparo Corso. They were both known by Miguel de Cervantes, who witnessed their activities during his captivity in Algiers. Andrea Gasparo Corso had become a friend of Abd el-Malik during the latter's residence in Algiers, before his becoming Sultan of Morocco.
