= Abu Marwan Abd al-Malik I Saadi =

Saadi Dynasty ruler from 1576 to 1578

Abd al-Malik أبو مروان عبد الملك الغازي

Saadi Sultan
- Reign: 1576 – 1578
- Predecessor: Abu Abdallah Mohammed
- Successor: Ahmad al-Mansur
- Born: c. 1541; Marrakesh, Saadi Sultanate
- Died: 4 August 1578 (aged 37); Ksar el-Kebir, Saadi Sultanate
- Burial: August 1578; Saadian Tombs, Marrakesh
- Spouse: Zahara bint Agi Morato
- Issue: Moulay Ismail al-Sâadi
Names
- Abu Marwan Abd al-Malik bin Mohammed al-Shaykh al-Saadi
Era dates
- 16th Century
- Dynasty: Saadian dynasty
- Father: Mohammed al-Shaykh
- Mother: Sahaba al-Rehmania
- Religion: Sunni Islam
- Military career
- Allegiance: Saadi Sultanate (1554–1557); Ottoman Empire (1557–1576); Saadi Sultanate (1576–1578)
- Service years: c. 1554 – 1578
- Conflicts: Battle of Tadla (1554); Battle of Lepanto (1571); Conquest of Tunis (1574); Capture of Fez (1576); Battle of Alcácer Quibir (1578)

Abu Marwan Abd al-Malik I (Arabic: أبو مروان عبد الملك الغازي), often simply Abd al-Malik or Mulay Abdelmalek, (b. 1541 – d. 4 August 1578) was the Saadian Sultan from 1576 until his death right after the Battle of Alcácer Quibir against Portugal in 1578.

== Biography ==
=== Saadian Prince (1541–1557) ===
Abd al-Malik was one of the sons of the Saadian Sultan Mohammed al-Shaykh and Sahaba al-Rehmania, his father was assassinated by the Ottomans in 1557 by order of Hasan Pasha, son of Barbarossa, as he was preparing for an alliance with Spain against the Ottomans.

One of his brothers Abdallah al-Ghalib (1557–1574) then took power and ascended to the throne. He planned to eliminate his other brothers in the process. Abd al-Malik had to escape from Morocco and stay abroad with his mother Sahâba al-Rehmânia, his elder brother Abd al-Mu'min al-Saadi and his younger brother Ahmad until 1576.

=== Exile to the Ottoman Empire (1557–1576) ===
Abd al-Malik spent 17 years among the Ottomans with his brothers, most of the time in the Regency of Algiers, benefiting from Ottoman training and contacts with Ottoman culture. Abd al-Mu'min was named governor of the city of Tlemcen by the ruler of the Regency of Algiers, Hasan Pasha, but Abd al-Mu'min was assassinated there in 1571.

Abd al-Malik visited Istanbul on several occasions. He went to the Ottoman capital in July 1571, and then was involved with his brother al-Mansur in the Battle of Lepanto on the Ottoman side on 7 October 1571. He was captured during the battle and transported to Spain and then brought before the Spanish king Philip II. The Spanish king decided, upon the advice of Andrea Gasparo Corso, to hold him captive in the Spanish possession of Oran, in order to use him when the opportunity arose. However, Abd al-Malik managed to escape from Oran in 1573 and travelled back to the Ottoman Empire.

In January 1574, while in Constantinople, French physician Guillaume Bérard saved Abd al-Malik's life during an epidemic. As a result, they later became friends. When Abd al-Malik became Sultan, he asked Henry III of France that Guillaume Bérard be appointed Consul of France in Morocco.

In 1574, Abd al-Malik participated in the conquest of Tunis by the Ottomans. Following this success, he again visited Constantinople, and obtained from the new Ottoman ruler Murad III an agreement to help him militarily regain the Moroccan throne.

Abd al-Malik joined the Ottomans and was able to invade Morocco with the help of an Ottoman force of 10,000 soldiers dispatched from Algiers in 1576. The Ottoman force captured Fez during that year.

=== Reign (1576–1578) ===
Abd al-Malek recognized the Ottoman sultan Murad III as his Caliph, and reorganized his army on Ottoman lines and adopted Ottoman customs, but negotiated for the Ottoman troops to leave his country, in exchange for a large payment in gold.

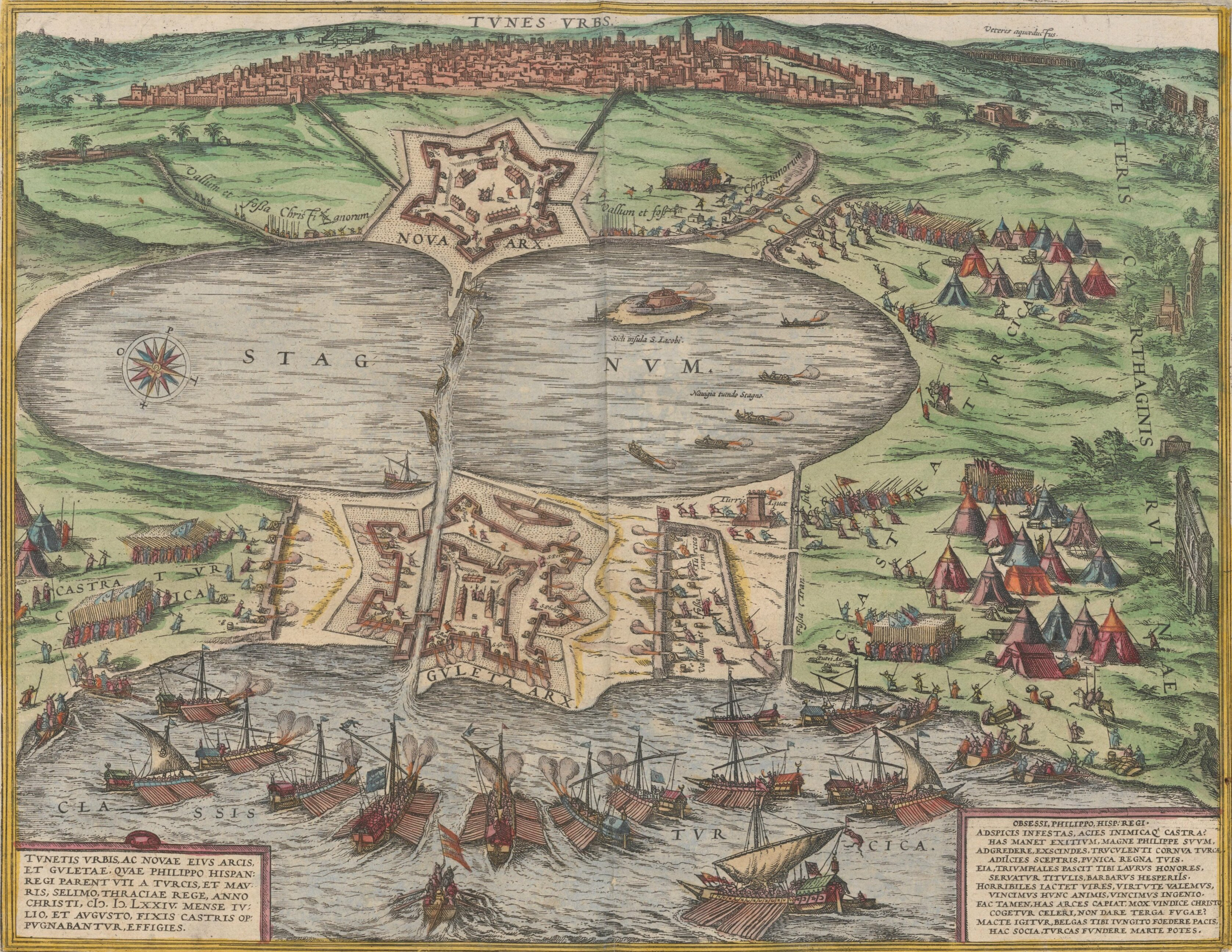
Abd al-Malik participated in the Ottoman Conquest of Tunis in 1574

In the following period he tried to revive trade with Europe and especially England, starting an Anglo-Moroccan alliance with Elizabeth I. According to Richard Hakluyt, as quoted by Edmund Hogan, ruler "Abdelmelech" bears "a greater affection to our Nation than to others because of our religion, which forbids the worship of Idols". He wrote a letter in Spanish to Elizabeth in 1577.

=== Battle of Alcácer Quibir (1578) ===
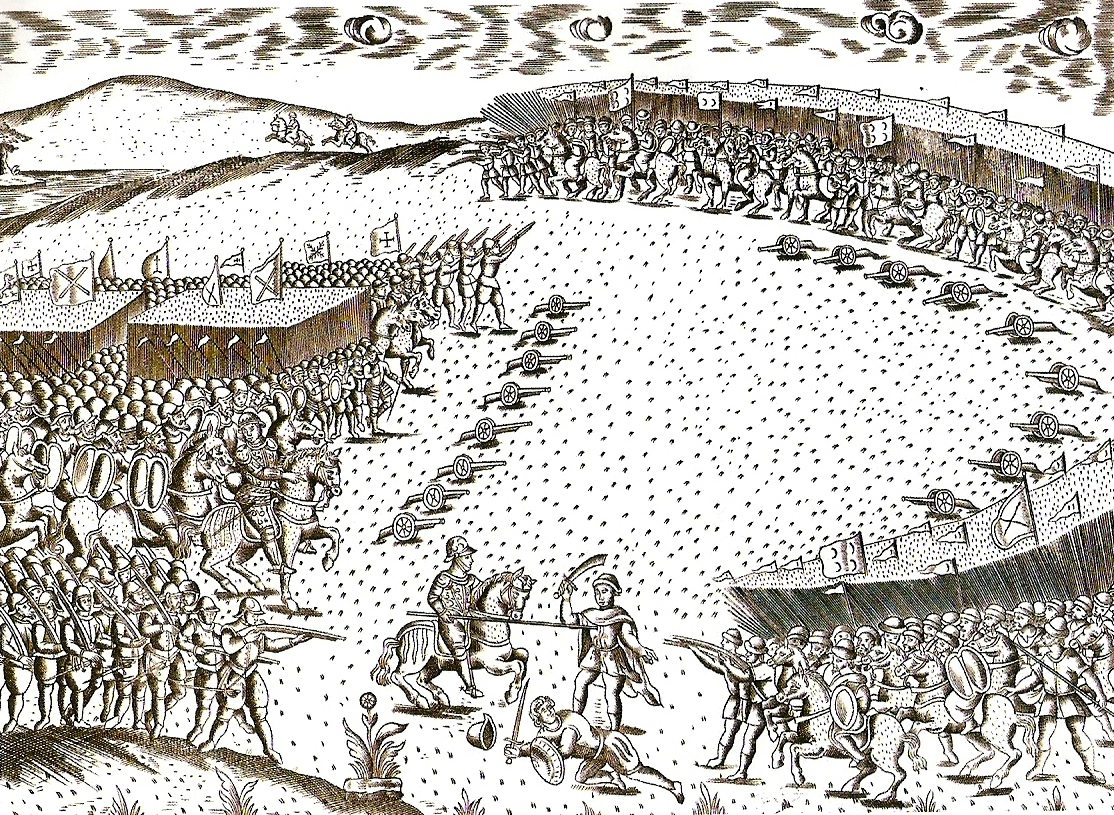
Battle of Alcácer Quibir (1578), Museum of the Ponta da Bandeira Fort, Lagos, Portugal

After losing the throne to Abu Marwan Abd al-Malik I in 1576, the ousted Sultan Abu Abdallah Mohammed II had been able to flee to Portugal and then convince King Sebastian to launch a military campaign against Morocco. Accounts of the battle unanimously liken the battle formation to that of the Ottomans, describing it as a Turkish order. Most contingents were equipped with arquebuses and large muskets, an Ottoman model imported from Algiers. A heavy shot charge unleashed by the Zwawa and renegades scattered the Portuguese forces and was likely the primary cause of their defeat.

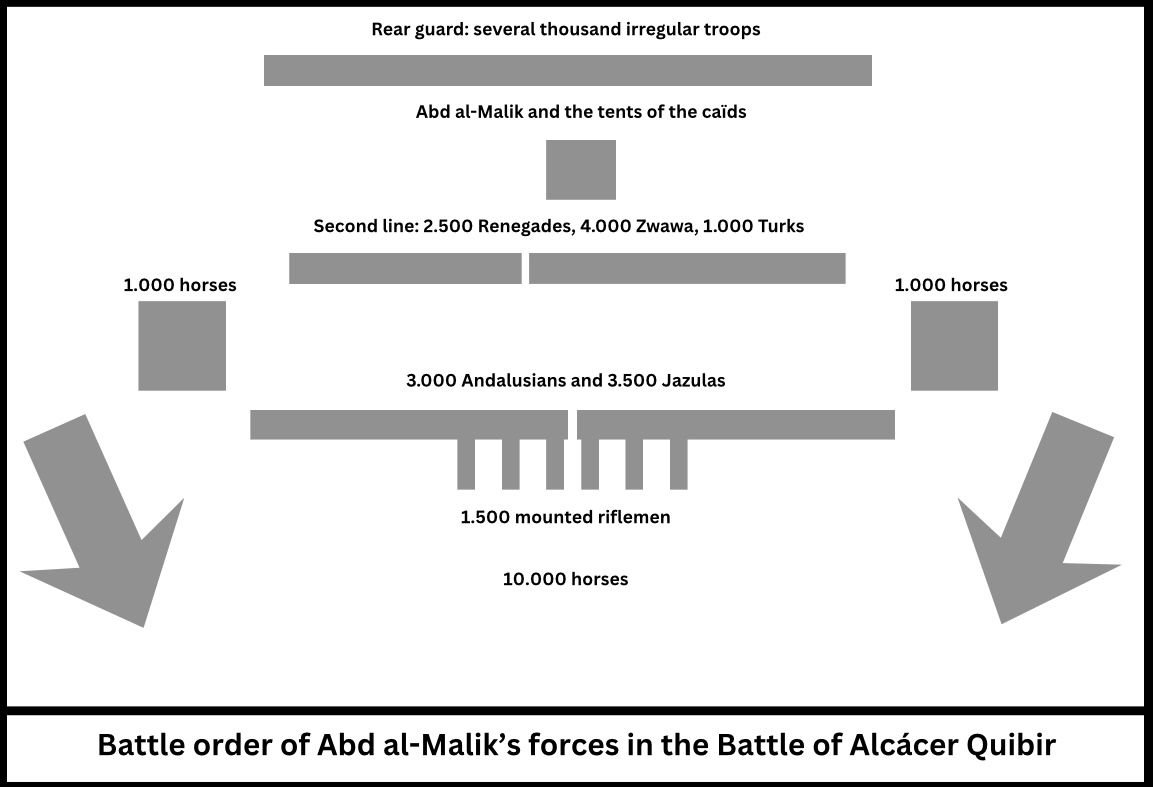
Battle order of Abd al-Malik’s army in the Battle of Alcácer Quibir

The campaign turned out to be a complete failure after they were defeated at the Battle of Alcácer Quibir in 1578. The battle ended after nearly four hours of heavy fighting and resulted in the total defeat of the Portuguese and Abu Abdallah's army leaving 8,000 dead, including the slaughter of almost the whole country's nobility, with 15,000 taken as prisoners. Perhaps 100 survivors had managed to escape to the coast. The body of King Sebastian, who led a charge into the midst of the enemy and was then cut off, was never found. The disappearance of Sebastian and the deaths of Abu Abdallah and Abd al-Malik has earned the battle the name "Battle of the Three Kings".

=== Death (1578) ===
Abd al-Malik is known to have been seriously ill in the days leading up to the battle. During the battle itself, he died under unclear circumstances, possibly in combat or from natural causes from his illness. Other accounts, mainly by Moroccan historians, claim that he had been poisoned by some of his officers of Turkish background as part of an Ottoman conspiracy, similar to what had happened to Muhammad al-Shaykh in 1557. While plausible, this account may also have reflected anti-Ottoman attitudes that were present in the court of Ahmad al-Mansur, who succeeded his brother to the throne and ruled from 1578 to 1603.

== See also ==
- Anglo-Moroccan alliance
- List of rulers of Morocco
- History of Morocco
- Saadian dynasty
- Ahmad al-Mansur

== Bibliography ==
- Stephan and Nandy Ronart: Lexikon der Arabischen Welt. Artemis Verlag, 1972 ISBN 3-7608-0138-2

Preceded by Abu Abdallah Mohammed	Saadian dynasty 1576–1578	Succeeded by Ahmad al-Mansur
