= Capture of Fez (1576) =

1576 battle in Fez

- Part of the Conflicts between the Regency of Algiers and Morocco
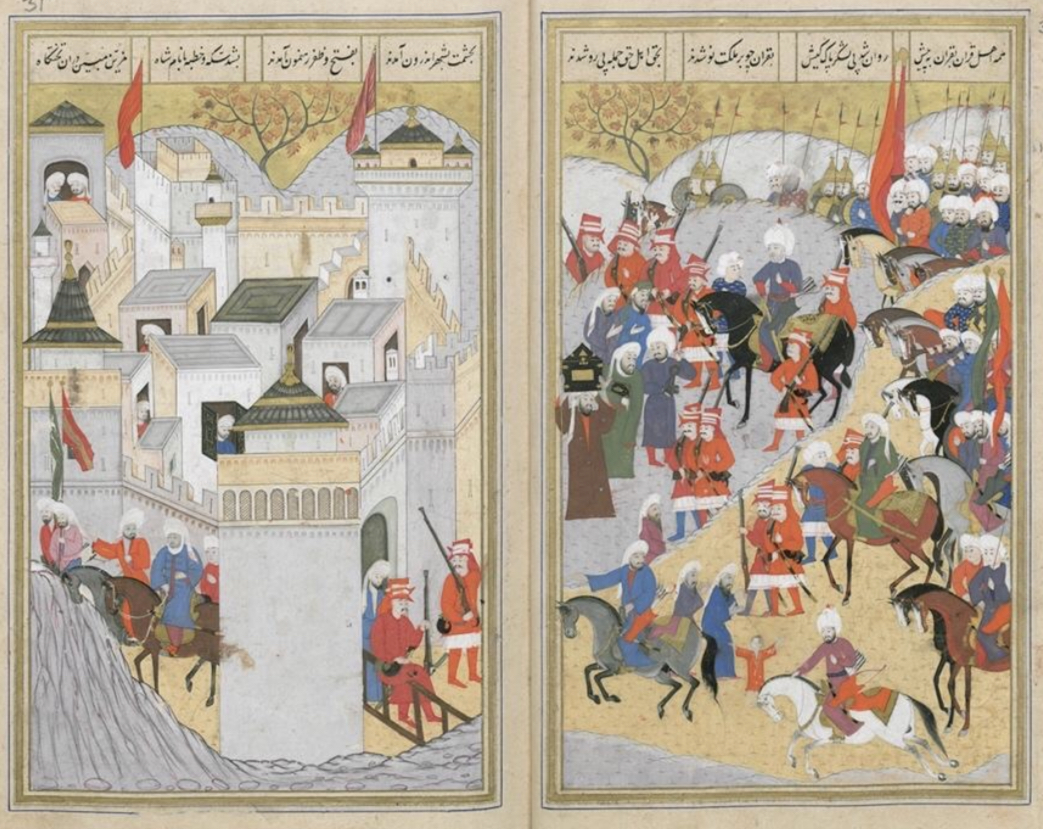
- Ottoman miniature depicting the capture of Fez under the command of Ramazan Pasha, Beylerbey of Algiers.
Date	March 1576
Location	Fez 34.3°N 4.9°W
Result	Regency of Algiers victory: Forces of the Regency of Algiers capture Fez and Marrakesh; Abd al-Malek assumes rule over the Saadian domain acknowledging Ottoman authority

Belligerents
Saadi Sultanate	Regency of Algiers; Kingdom of Kuku

Commanders and leaders
Muhammad al-Mutawakkil	Abd al-Malek; Ramazan Pasha

Units involved
Makhzania: Jazulas; Andalusians	Janissaries; Zwawas

Strength
Turkish sources: 60,000	Turkish sources: 14,700

Casualties and losses
Unknown	Unknown
- Location of capture of Fez

The Capture of Fez took place in 1576 at Fez, when forces operating from the Regency of Algiers supported the Saadian prince Abd al-Malik in securing the Saadian throne against his nephew and rival claimant, Muhammad al-Mutawakkil. This support was linked to a political arrangement in which Abd al-Malik publicly acknowledged Ottoman supremacy in political practice.

== Background ==
The Saadian ruler Abdallah al-Ghalib is reported to have remitted regular payments to Ottoman authorities in a tributary arrangement, and his successor al-Mutawakkil entered into an accommodation with Murad III that involved ongoing remittances. These arrangements, however, did not prevent the Regency of Algiers, acting within an Ottoman imperial context, from supporting Abd al-Malik’s competing claim.

During his exile, Abd al-Malik learned Turkish, adopted Ottoman dress, and moved within the Janissary forcesa and became a trusted member of the Ottomans. He petitioned Murad III for assistance in pressing his claim to the Saadian throne and presented recognition of Ottoman supremacy as part of the political terms for such support.

== Battle ==
In 1576 forces of the Regency of Algiers, commanded by Ramazan Pasha and accompanied by Abd al-Malik, departed Algiers (in present-day Algeria) to support his accession. Its forces reportedly included a contingent of Janissaries, about 1,000 Zwawas from the polity of Kuku, and additional troops under Abd al-Malik’s command. A decisive engagement took place at al-Rukn, near Fez (in present-day Morocco), in which al-Mutawakkil was defeated, reportedly in part because al-Dughali, commander of his Andalusian contingents, withdrew or defected on the eve of battle.

Abd al-Malik entered Fez on 11 March 1576. Al-Mutawakkil fled toward Marrakesh, suffered further defeat, and ultimately sought refuge in the Sous. After taking power, Abd al-Malik publicly acknowledged Ottoman supremacy. Murad III’s name was proclaimed in the Friday khutba and struck on coinage, both recognized markers of political authority and hierarchical recognition in Islamic political life.

== Aftermath ==
Once established at Fez, Abd al-Malik recognized the Ottoman Sultan Murad III as Caliph, and reorganized his army along Ottoman lines and adopted Ottoman customs, yet he negotiated for the Ottoman troops to leave his domain in exchange for a large payment in gold. This suggests that he envisioned a more autonomous tributary status than the Ottoman Sultan may have anticipated. At his request, a smaller force, reported as 300 Janissaries and 1,000 Zwawas, remained at Fez as a guard attached to the ruler. The two-year reign of Abd al-Malik was a period of pronounced Ottoman influence, during which the Saadian ruler acknowledged the authority of the Ottoman Sultan.

Abd al-Malik sent remittances to Ottoman authorities; the first is reported as 200,000 gold coins. In a letter to the qaʾid of Tetouan dated 18 March 1576, he described himself as "servant of the Ottoman Sultan, and Sovereign of the Moors, of Fez, Marrakesh, the Souss, and Taroudant". He also pursued administrative and military reorganization, drawing on Ottoman personnel and expertise; sources report the arrival of Turkish officers, technicians, and craftsmen into his service. His reign intensified Ottoman influence in military organization, titulature, and courtly practice, a practise that continued, in modified form, under his successor Ahmad al-Mansur.

Meanwhile, al-Mutawakkil fled first to what is now Spain and then to Portugal, where King Sebastian promised support for an attempt to recover the throne. This led to the Portuguese expedition of 1578 and the Battle of Ksar al-Kabir (also known as the Battle of the Three Kings), a major Portuguese defeat that contributed to the dynastic crisis culminating in the Iberian Union of 1580. Before the battle, Abd al-Malik had acknowledged the suzerainty of the Ottomans.

Abd al-Malik was succeeded by his brother Ahmad al-Mansur, who initially maintained forms of recognition toward the Ottoman ruler, before progressively recalibrating the relationship in subsequent years and reducing outward markers of subordination to the Ottomans.
