= Battle of Wadi al-Laban =

1558 battle in Morocco

Date	March–April 1558
Location	Wadi al-Laban, Morocco 34.3°N 4.9°W
Result	Inconclusive

Belligerents
Saadi Sultanate	Regency of Algiers

Commanders and leaders
Abdallah al-Ghalib	Hasan Pasha

Strength
Unknown	Unknown

Casualties and losses
Unknown	Unknown
- Location of the battle of Wadi al-Laban in Morocco.

The Battle of Wadi al-Laban (Arabic: معركة وادي اللبن) occurred in March–April 1558 between Saadians and Ottoman Algerian forces under Hasan Pasha, the son of Hayreddin Barbarossa. It took place north of Fes, at Wadi al-Laban, an affluent of the Sebou River, one day north of Fes.

== Background ==
This conflict took place in a context of tensions between Algeria and Morocco. Hasan Pasha son of Hayreddin Barbarossa, the ruler of the Regency of Algiers on behalf of the Ottoman Empire, captured Fes from the Saadians in early 1554 and installed a Wattasid client. The Saadian ruler Mohammed al-Shaykh recaptured the city later that year. Following the return of the Saadians, numerous conflicts broke out between Algeria and Morocco, which tried to annex the Algerian city of Tlemcen. Mohammed al-Shaykh subsequently sought an alliance with the Spaniards who were occupying Oran at the time and were fighting the Ottomans as well, but the agreement failed to materialize.

Hasan Pasha, the son of Barbarossa, was reappointed beylerbey of Algiers by the Ottoman sultan Suleiman I in June 1557. The Ottomans sent the Saadian sultan an embassy demanding he recognize the overlordship of the Ottoman sultan, which Mohammed al-Shaykh refused. Mohammed al-Shaykh was then assassinated in October 1557 by Turkish officers sent by Istanbul and entered into Saadian service under the pretense of being deserters. He was succeeded by Abdallah al-Ghalib.

Meanwhile, the Saadians had occupied Tlemcen in 1556 but failed to capture the Machouar palace while the Ottoman Algerians were busy besieging the Spaniards in Oran. After Mohammed al-Shaykh's death, Hasan Pasha marched west, forcing the Saadians to abandon Tlemcen.

== Battle ==
Led by Hasan Pasha, the Ottoman force pursued the retreating Saadian army into Morocco. An indecisive battle between the two sides took place in Wadi al-Laban to the north of Fez in early 1558.

== Aftermath ==
After the battle, Hasan Pasha decided to retreat upon hearing of Spanish preparations for an offensive from Oran in Western Algeria. He embarked with his troops at the port of Qassasa in northern Morocco, just west of Melilla, and from there sailed to Algiers to prepare a defense against the Spaniards, who soon attacked in the Mostaganem expedition.

Some sources attribute a victory to either Hassan or Abdallah. Abdallah al-Ghalib later sent an expedition against Tlemcen in 1560 but it was defeated.

== See also ==
- Conflicts between Ottoman Algeria and Morocco
- Morocco-Ottoman relations
