= Capture of Fez (1554) =

Battle in Africa

Coordinates: 34°02′36″N 05°00′12″W

- Part of the Conflicts between the Regency of Algiers and Morocco and Ottoman Expeditions to Morocco
Date	7 January 1554
Location	Qudyat-al-Mahali, Fez, Morocco
Result	Algerian–Ottoman victory • Fez is conquered
Territorial changes	Fez becomes an Ottoman vassal

Belligerents
Ottoman Empire; Wattasid Dynasty; Regency of Algiers; Kingdom of Kuku	Saadi Sultanate

Commanders and leaders
Salah Rais; Ali Abu Hassun	Mohammed ash-Sheikh

Strength
6,000 musketeers 1,000 sipahis 4,000 Kabyle horsemen or 4,000 men	30,000 horsemen 10,000 infantrymen or 20,000 men

Casualties and losses
Unknown	Unknown
- Location within Morocco

The Conquest of Fez or Capture of Fez took place in 1554 between the Algerian forces of Salah Rais and the ruler of the Saadi Sultanate, Mohammed ash-Sheikh. The battle took place on 7 January at Qudyat-al-Mahali, a suburb near Fez and occurred after Salah Reis’ two previous victories against the Saadians, one at Taza and another at the Sebou river. One of the objectives of the expedition is to restore Ali Abu Hassun, a Wattassid pretender, to the throne.

== Background ==
Despite the Ottoman domination of most of North Africa, Morocco had managed to remain independent. At the heart of this kingdom was Fez, which became one of the most opulent cities in the medieval world under the rule of the Marinid dynasty. In the latter part of the 15th century the Wattasid sultans were in control and they started losing the coast to the Portuguese and Spanish forces. An account also said that the last of the Wattasid sultans forged a tactical alliance with the Portuguese, which diminished his standing among religious leaders. As their power crumbled, the regime faced a new threat from the Saadis, who claimed they were shorfa or descendants of Muhammad. These migrants from north Africa expanded their territory and forged support and alliances.

In 1544/1545 Ali Abu Hassun, the Wattasid ruler of northern Morocco, hoping to gain military support from the Ottomans, formally recognised the authority of the Ottoman Sultan and declared himself a vassal of the Ottomans. However the Ottomans were unable to intervene in 1549 when Abu Hassun lost Fez to Mohammed al-Shaykh, the first Saadi sultan. For his part, the Wattassid Ali Abu Hassun, who expected Portuguese help to regain his throne, found himself on board a ship captured, on July 5, 1553, in the harbor of Vélez, by Salah Raïs on his return from a naval expedition against Majorca and Menorca. Salah Raïs saw this as an opportunity to intervene in Morocco by supporting the Wattassids.

The relations between the regency of Algiers and the Saadian sultan Mohammed al-Shaykh did not have a good start, as the Ottomans supported their Wattasid rivals. The Saadian Sultan was treated as a subordinate and in a haughty manner by the Ottoman Sultan who referred to him as "governor of the province of Fez". Not accepting the haughty tone of the Sultan and wanting to take advantage of the resumption of the Ottoman war on other fronts, Mohammed al-Shaykh tried to annex Tlemcen and its region. The Moroccans captured the city but were expelled by Ottoman janissaries and local supporters. The following year, he repeated his attempt with an army of 17,000 fighters led by his three sons, but he was once again severely defeated. Following this defeat, Mohammed al-Shaykh welcomed with respect the ambassador of the beylerbey of Algiers to negotiate the end of the conflict and to fix the course of the Moulouya as the border between the Saadian dynasty and the regency of Algiers. However, Mohammed al-Shaykh resumed his incursions to the east of the Moulouya shortly afterwards and concluded an alliance with the Spaniards, which rekindled the war between him and Salah Raïs.

== Battle ==
In 1553, Salah Rais left for Fez with 6,000 musketeers, 1,000 sipahis and a contingent of 4,000 cavalrymen who were partisans of the Kingdom of Kuku. The Sultan of Fez, having been alerted to this offensive, gathered 30,000 horsemen and 10,000 men to defend Fez. Shortly thereafter, the Sultan of Fez prepared his army for battle. The pasha of Algiers, although he had a much smaller army, also prepared his army for battle against the advice of his officers.

The Sultan of Fez met the troops of the Regency of Algiers near Taza on December 5, 1553, but withdrew from that city to a fortress once he realized the superiority of the Ottoman artillery. Shortly thereafter, Salah Raïs undertook a surprise night attack on the fortress where he charged a corps of 1,500 men he had selected. According to historian Ernest Mercier, this first attack was a great success and the Moroccan soldiers were frightened by the detonations and forced to retreat to the heights in the direction of Fez. After receiving a reinforcement of 600 men, brought from the province of Velez by the sons of Abu Hassun, the beylerbey launched the final assault on the city of Fez during the night of 4 to 5 January 1554 from the locality of Sebou where the Algerian army was stationed. Salah Reis defeated al-Shaykh at Qudyat-al-Mahali, a suburb near Fez.

The troops of Salah Rais entered victoriously in Fez in the night of January 7 to 8, 1554, and Wattasid Ali Abu Hassun was declared sovereign, as a vassal of the Ottoman sultan.

== Consequences ==
The Sharif's chief wife and two daughters were captured by the Pasha of Algiers. The Algerians gained an immense booty after pillaging Fez and the Pasha managed to extort 300,000 ducats from the Jewish quarter. The population of Fez were happy about the return of the Wattasid sovereign and gave Salah Reis an excellent welcome, however they began rebelling against him when they saw the Turks laying hands on the women and children and looting whatever they wanted. Numerous complaints arose about the Turks in Fez who seized women and committed all sorts of acts of violence. For four months the Ottoman troops, Turks and Berbers from Kabylia, stayed in Fez and harassed its population until Ali Abu Hassun bought the withdrawal of the Turks. Upon withdrawal, Salah Raïs assured the Saadi ruler that he would grant his enemy, Ali Abu Hassun, no further assistance. The latter reigned for nearly nine months over Fez before the Saadian Mohammed ech-Sheikh took over the city. Salah Raïs was installed in part for his services at the Penon of Velez Gomara, an advance base for raiding the Spanish coast and shipping.
