= Battle of Alcácer Quibir =

1578 battle in Morocco

Coordinates: 35°01′N 5°54′W

- Part of the Moroccan–Portuguese conflicts
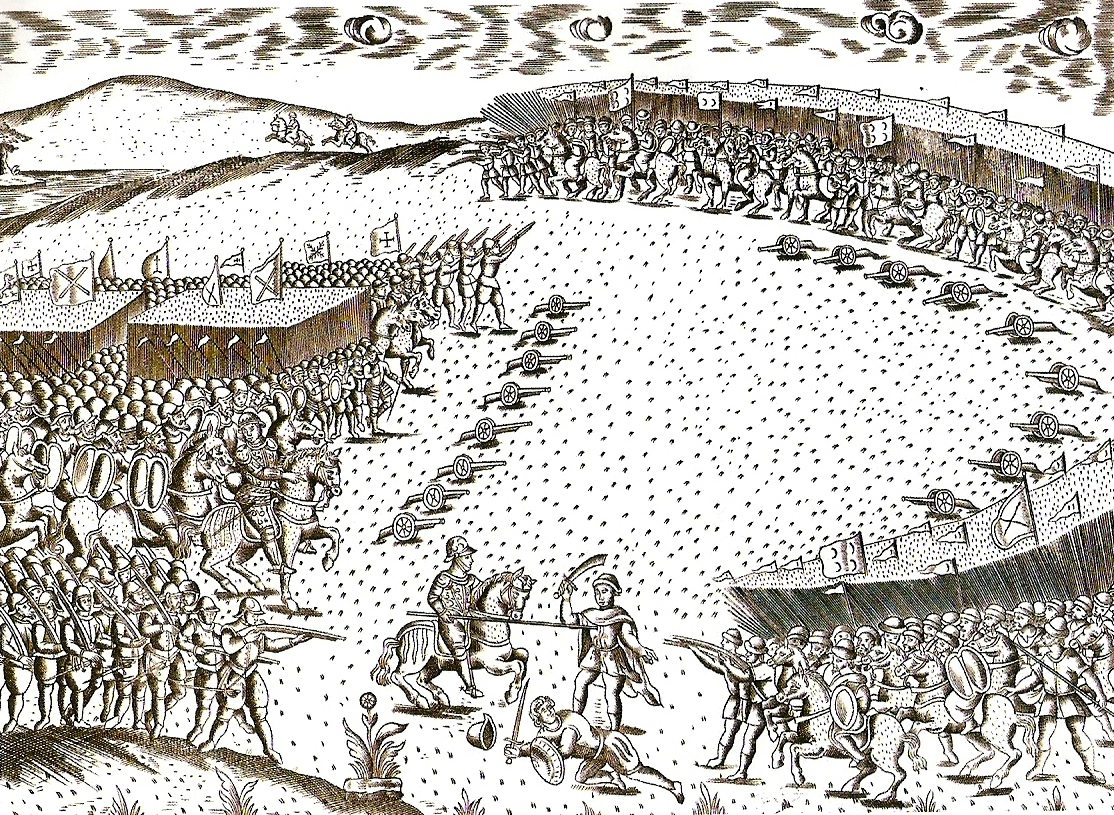
- Battle at Ksar el Kebir, depicting the encirclement of the Portuguese army on the left
Date	August 4, 1578; 448 years ago
Location	Alcácer Quibir, Morocco
Result	Moroccan victory

Belligerents
Kingdom of Portugal; Saadi allies	Saadi Sultanate; Ottoman Empire

Commanders and leaders
Sebastian I (MIA) (Note: Sebastian disappeared in the battle and was later presumed dead. This would lead to Sebastianism, a myth based on the belief that he would reappear and return to Portugal at some critical point in the future.); Mohammed II †	Abd al-Malik I # Ahmad al-Mansur

Strength
23,000 men; 6,000 Moors; 3,000 Flemish and Germans; 2,000 Castilians; 600 Italians; 40 cannons	60,000–100,000 men; 12,000 cavalrymen; Several thousand irregular troops; 4,000 Zwawa; 3,500 Jazulas; 3,000 Andalusians; 2,500 Renegades; 1,500 riflemen; 1,000 Turks; 34 cannons

Casualties and losses
8,000 killed 15,000 captured or 12,000 killed (Spanish sources)	7,000 killed (Portuguese sources) or 1,500 killed (Spanish sources)

The Battle of Alcácer Quibir (also known as "Battle of Three Kings" (Arabic: معركة الملوك الثلاثة) or "Battle of Wadi al-Makhazin" (Arabic: معركة وادي المخازن) in Morocco) was fought in northern Morocco, near the town of Ksar-el-Kebir (variant spellings: Ksar El Kebir, Alcácer-Quivir, Alcazarquivir, Alcassar, etc.) and Larache, on 4 August 1578.

A Moroccan victory, the battle has been described as "the greatest military disaster the Portuguese ever suffered in the course of their overseas expansion." It marked an end to Portuguese attempts to reconquer territories it had lost in Morocco.

The combatants were the army of the deposed Moroccan Sultan Abu Abdallah Mohammed II, with his ally, the King of Portugal Sebastian I, against a large Moroccan army under the new Sultan of Morocco (and uncle of Abu Abdallah Mohammed II) Abd Al-Malik I.

The Christian king Sebastian I had planned a crusade after Abu Abdallah asked him to help recover his throne. Abu Abdallah's uncle, Abd Al-Malik, had taken it from him with Ottoman support. The defeat of Portugal and disappearance of the childless Sebastian led to the end of the Aviz dynasty, and the integration of the country into the Iberian Union for 60 years under the Philippine dynasty in a dynastic union with Spain.

== Prelude ==
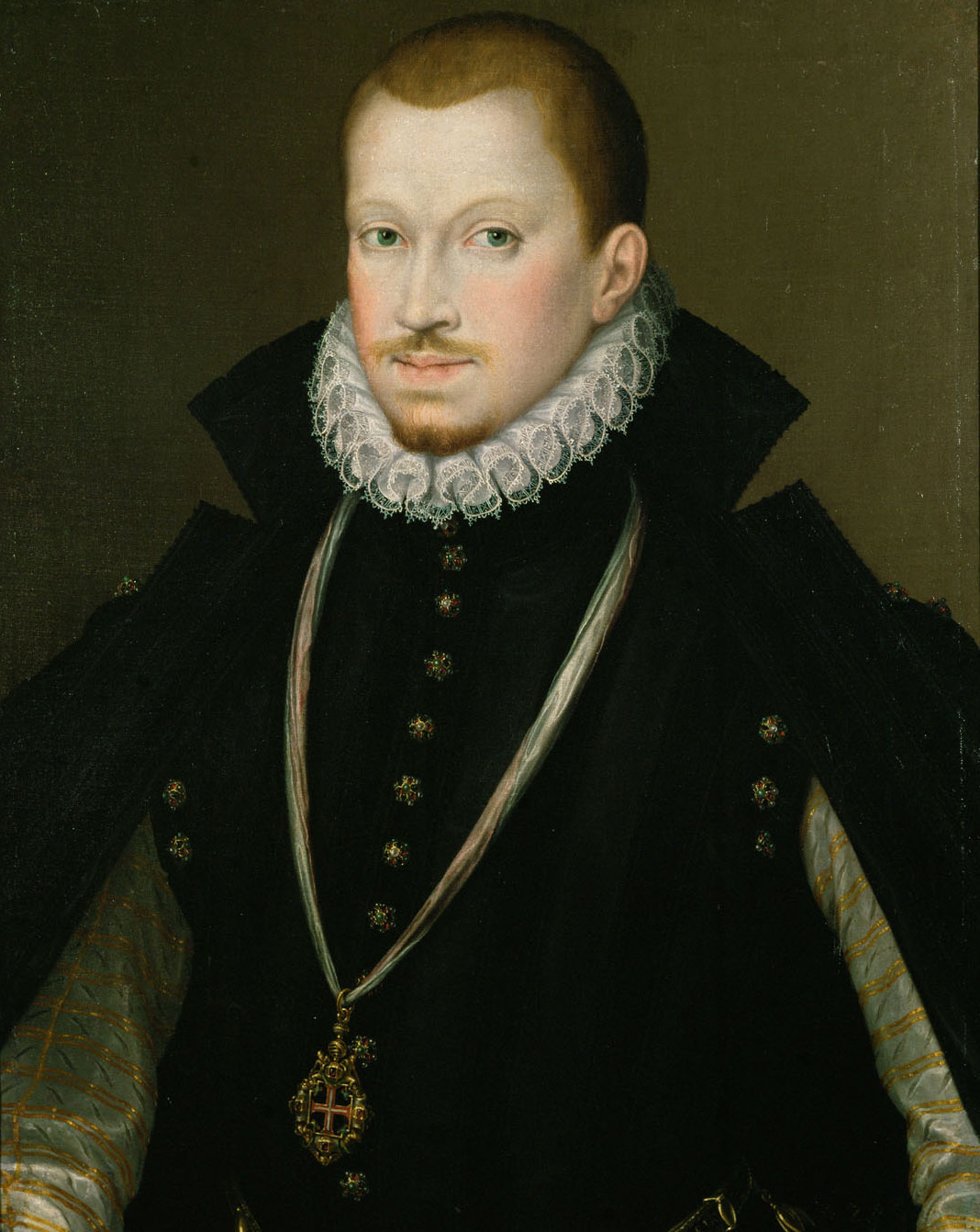
King Sebastian of Portugal

=== King Sebastian of Portugal ===
Sebastian, who would later be known in Portugal as the Desired, was the son of the Infante Dom John (son of John III of Portugal) and Joanna, daughter of the Emperor Charles V. His father died before he was born, and he became king at the age of three after the death of his grandfather in 1557. He was educated almost entirely by Jesuits, by his guardian and tutor Aleixo de Meneses and by Catherine of Austria, sister of Charles V and wife of King John III. Some, judging him after his defeat, alleged that under these influences his youthful idealism soon mutated into religious fanaticism, although he never joined the Holy League.

The Portuguese Cortes asked Sebastian several times to go to Morocco and stop the turmoil of the advancing Turkish military presence, because the Ottomans would be a threat to the security of the Portuguese coasts and to the commerce with Guinea, Brazil, and the Atlantic Islands, like the Azores and Madeira. But it was only when Abu Abdallah Mohammed II al-Mutawakkil went to Portugal and asked for Sebastian's help in recovering his throne from his uncle that Sebastian decided to mount a military effort. Sebastian felt driven to revive lost glories by intervening in North Africa, influenced by the events such as the defense of Mazagan in 1562 from a Moroccan siege. Accordingly, in 1568, the kingdom began to prepare for intervention in Morocco.

This policy was not only supported by the mercantile bourgeoisie as it would benefit commerce in this area (primarily, gold, cattle, wheat, and sugar), but also by the nobility. Up to that time Portuguese military action in Africa had been confined to small expeditions and raids; Portugal had built its vast maritime empire from Brazil to the East Indies by a combination of trade, sea exploration, and technological superiority, with Christian conversion of subject peoples being one, but by no means the only, end in view. Sebastian proposed to change this strategy entirely.

In 1574 Sebastian visited some of the Portuguese bases in North Africa and led a successful raid on Muslim territory beyond the then Portuguese city of Tangier, engaging in several skirmishes and in a confrontation of greater magnitude on 21 October. Although at a numerical disadvantage but with a heavy contingent of cavalry, he was successful, which encouraged him to grander designs against the new Saadian ruler of Morocco. He gave his support to Al-Mutawakkil, who was engaged in a civil war to recover the throne of Morocco from his uncle, the Emir Abd Al-Malik—who was aided by the Ottomans. Despite the admonitions of his mother and his uncle Philip II of Spain (who had become very cautious after the Battle of Djerba), Sebastian was determined to wage a military campaign, and he used much of Portugal's imperial wealth to equip a large fleet and gather an army which included soldiers of several nationalities: 2,000 volunteers from Spain (Castile), 3,000 mercenaries from Flanders and Germany, and 600 Italians initially recruited to aid in an invasion of Ireland under the leadership of the English adventurer, Thomas Stukley. It is said that the expeditionary force numbered 500 ships, and the army in total numbered about 23,000 men, including the flower of the Portuguese nobility.

=== Sultan Abd al-Malik of Morocco ===
Morocco, meanwhile, was under the rule of the Saadi (or Saadian) dynasty, a Moroccan Sharifian dynasty. Their rise to power began as a resistance to the Portuguese presence in Agadir and by the 1550s they controlled most of present-day Morocco and had supplanted the earlier Wattasid dynasty. Upon the death of Sultan Abdallah al-Ghalib in 1574 his son Muhammad II al-Mutawakkil inherited the throne, but two years later he was overthrown by his uncle Abd al-Malik. Abd al-Malik had travelled to Istanbul in 1574 and secured Ottoman support from the Sultan there himself. The beylerbey of Algiers provided him with troops and with these Abd al-Malik was able to depose his nephew after winning a decisive victory near Fez. Once on the throne, as an Ottoman vassal he had the Friday prayers and the khutba in mosques delivered in the Ottoman sultan's name (Murad III), adopted Ottoman clothing, and organized his army along Ottoman lines with the help of Turkish officers. After this, the Saadi army, whose bulk was recruited from guich troops ("military tribes" mobilized to serve as regular levies), combined mounted arquebusiers, infantry armed with rifles, large numbers of light cavalry, and a detachment of artillery; most of which were newly trained in Ottoman tactics. In addition to his local guich troops and Berber contingents, many of the soldiers were recruited from Andalusis previously expelled from the Iberian Peninsula (or descended from those refugees), Berber tribes from the east such as the Zwawa, and from the Turks and ex-Ottoman soldiers in the region.

=== Ottoman presence ===
When the Ottoman council received news that a large Crusader army, led by the Portuguese, was planning to land in Morocco, they appointed Ramazan Pasha, who had been appointed governor of Tunis, to lead the expedition due to his familiarity with the region and his friendship with Sultan Abdülmelik. Ramazan Pasha then arrived with a force of 80,000.

Indications of the presence of an Ottoman force accompanying the Moroccans to the battlefield vary between sources. Historian Stephen Cory, in reviewing relations between the Saadians and Ottomans in this period, states that the battle was won by the Saadians "without direct Ottoman assistance." Abderrahmane El Moudden, in a large study of Ottoman-Saadian diplomacy in this period, notes that some modern Turkish sources attribute the 1578 victory to Ottoman forces led by Ramazan Pasha on the field—though he also notes that some of these sources are liable to exaggerate Turkish military history.

In an encyclopedic entry about King Sebastian, historian Allen Fromherz indicates the presence of Ottoman forces at the battle, including Janissaries. Historian R. G. Grant states that Abd al-Malik's army was "partly supplied by the Ottoman Turks" and that it combined "Moroccan cavalry with Ottoman musket-armed infantry and cannon". Professor of Islamic Studies, Jamil M. Abun-Nasr, states that the Turks "could not take over the affairs of Morocco after [the Battle of Alcácer's] victory to which they contributed much". He also mentions that Abd al-Malik's army included Turkish troops, that its officers were Turks and so was the commander of his army, who is alleged to have had Abd al-Malik poisoned in order to secure total Ottoman control over Morocco.

== Campaign ==
After haranguing his troops from the windows of the Church of Santa Maria in Lagos, Sebastian departed that port in his armada on 24 June 1578.

He landed at Arzila, in Portuguese Morocco, where Abu Abdallah joined him with an additional 6,000 Moorish allied troops, and marched into the interior.

Abd al-Malik I, who was gravely ill, had meanwhile collected a large army, rallying his countrymen to jihad against the Portuguese invaders. The two armies approached each other near Ksar-el-Kebir, camping on opposite sides of the Loukkos River.

=== Battle ===
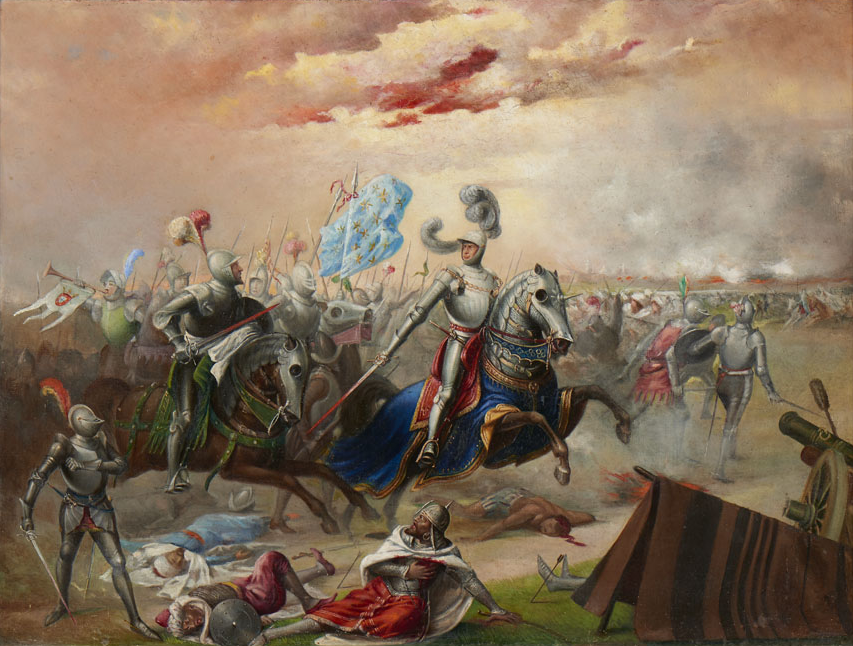
A scene of the battle. 19th-century depiction

On 4 August 1578, the Portuguese and Moorish allied troops were drawn up in battle array, and Sebastian rode around encouraging the ranks. But the Moroccans advanced on a broad front, planning to encircle his army.

The Sultan had 10,000 cavalry on the wings, and in the center had placed Moors who had been driven out of Spain and thus bore a special grudge against Christians. Despite his illness, the Sultan left his litter and led his forces on horseback joined by his doctor and the commander of the left wing, Mohamed Zarqun. Accounts note that the Moroccans employed a lunar or semi-lunar formation, likening it to that of the Ottoman model.

The battle started as both sides exchanged several volleys of gunfire from musketry and artillery. Stukley, commanding the Portuguese center, was killed by a cannonball early in the battle. The Moroccan cavalry advanced and began to encircle the Portuguese army. Both armies soon became fully engaged in a melee.

The flanks of the Portuguese army began to give way to the Moorish cavalry, and eventually the center became threatened as well. Seeing the flanks compromised, and having lost its commander early in battle, the Portuguese center lost heart and was overcome.

The Zwawa and the renegades unleashed a heavy shot charge that scattered the Portuguese forces and was likely the main cause of their defeat as it gave courage to the rest of the Moroccan army.

The battle ended after nearly four hours of heavy fighting and resulted in the total defeat of the Portuguese and Abu Abdallah's army with 8,000 dead, including the slaughter of almost the whole of Portugal's nobility. 15,000 were captured and sold into slavery, and around 100 survivors escaped to the coast. The body of King Sebastian, who led a charge into the midst of the enemy and was then cut off, was never found.

Sultan Abd Al-Malik died during the battle from unknown causes. Other accounts claim he was poisoned by some of his officers of Turkish background as part of an Ottoman conspiracy, but the news was concealed from his troops until total victory was secured. Abu Abdallah attempted to flee but drowned in the river. Because of the deaths of Sebastian, Abu Abdallah, and Abd Al-Malik, the battle became known in Morocco as the Battle of the Three Kings.

== Legacy ==
Abd Al-Malik was succeeded as Sultan by his brother Ahmad al-Mansur, also known as Ahmed Addahbi, who conquered Timbuktu, Gao, and Jenne after defeating the Songhai Empire. The Moroccan army which invaded Songhai in 1590–91 was made up mostly of European captives, including a number of Portuguese taken prisoner at the battle of Alcácer Quibir.

For Portugal, the battle was an unmitigated disaster. Sebastian died on the battlefield along with most of the Portuguese nobility. The captive nobles were ransomed, nearly bankrupting Portugal. Despite the lack of a body, Sebastian was presumed dead, at the age of 24. In his piety, he had remained unmarried and had sired no heir. His aged, childless uncle Henry of Portugal, a cardinal of the Roman church, succeeded to the throne as closest legitimate relative. His brief reign (1578–1580) was devoted to attempting to raise the crippling financial reparations demanded by the disastrous Morocco venture. After his death, legitimate claimants to the throne of the House of Aviz, which had ruled Portugal for 200 years, were defeated by a Castilian military invasion. Philip II of Spain, a maternal grandson of Manuel I of Portugal, and nearest male claimant (being an uncle of Sebastian I), invaded with an army of 40,000 men, defeating the troops of Anthony, Prior of Crato at the Battle of Alcântara and was crowned Philip I of Portugal by the Cortes of Tomar in 1581.

Later, at the beginning of his reign, Philip II ordered that the mutilated remains said to be Sebastian's (and so recognized after the battle by some of his close companions), and still in North Africa, be returned to Portugal, where they were buried at the Jerónimos Monastery, in Lisbon. Portugal and its Empire were not de jure incorporated into the Spanish Empire, and remained as a separate realm of the Spanish Habsburgs until 1640 when it broke away through the Portuguese Restoration War.

Partly in reaction to the national trauma of this disastrous defeat, a cult of 'Sebastianism' which portrayed the lost monarch in terms similar to King Arthur arose. The legend of Portugal's "Once and Future King" who would some day return to save his nation has ebbed and flowed in Portuguese life ever since.

== In fiction ==
- The battle was the subject of the George Peele English Renaissance play, The Battle of Alcazar, and is also a central event to the anonymously written The Famous History of the Life and Death of Captain Thomas Stukeley. It is also mentioned peripherally in Thomas Heywood's 1605 play If You Know Not Me, You Know Nobody. The real story of one of the most unfortunate and latest ransomed captives, Dom João de Portugal of the Counts de Vimioso, inspired the play Frei Luís de Sousa by Almeida Garrett.
- The battle is reenacted in the 1990 film The Battle of the Three Kings.
- In the 1990 film "Non", ou A Vã Glória de Mandar by the Portuguese director Manoel de Oliveira features a representation of the battle.
- The battle is represented in the 2020 video game Age of Empires III: Definitive Edition as a historical battle mission under the name "The Battle of the Three Kings".
- The battle is mentioned in the story "Among the Hairy Earthmen" by R. A. Lafferty, where it is depicted as one of a series of Renaissance battles provoked by extraterrestrial juvenile delinquents inhabiting human bodies.

== See also ==
- History of Morocco
- History of Portugal
- Military history of Morocco
- Military history of Portugal

== Bibliography ==
- Partly based on an entry on Sebastian in The Popular Encyclopedia; or, Conversations Lexicon (London: Blackie & Son, 1864)
- E. W. Bovill, The Battle of Alcazar (London: The Batchworth Press, 1952).
- Mary Elizabeth Brooks, A King for Portugal. The Madrigal conspiracy, 1594–95. On the impersonation of King Sebastian by Gabriel de Espinosa. With plates, including portraits (Madison and Milwaukee: The University of Wisconsin Press, 1964), Chapter 1.
- Marshall Cavendish: World and Its Peoples (2009)
- Lyle N. McAlister, Spain and Portugal in the New World, 1492–1700, Volume 3 (1984)
- Segal, Robert; Błocian, Ilona; Kuzmicki, Andrew, eds. (2022). Collective Structures of Imagination in Jungian Interpretation. Brill. ISBN 978-90-04-46875-7.
- Tucker, Spencer C. (2009). A Global Chronology of Conflict: From the Ancient World to the Modern Middle East. ABC-CLIO. ISBN 978-185109-672-5.
- Ralph Peters, Endless War: Middle-Eastern Islam Vs. Western Civilization (2011) ISBN 978-0-81170-823-4
