= Abu Abdallah Muhammad II Saadi =

Saadi Dynasty ruler from 1574 to 1576

Abdallah Mohammed Al-Mutawakkil عبد الله محمد المتوكل

Sultan
- Reign: 1574 – 1576
- Predecessor: Abdallah al-Ghalib
- Successor: Abd al-Malik
- Died: 4 August 1578; Ksar el-Kebir, Morocco
- Issue: Muley Xeque
Names
- Abu Abdallah Mohammed II Saadi bin Abdallah al-Ghalib
- Dynasty: Saadi dynasty
- Father: Abdallah al-Ghalib
- Religion: Sunni Islam
- Military career
- Conflicts: Capture of Fez (1576); Battle of Alcácer Quibir (1578) †

Abu Abdallah Mohammed II, Al-Mutawakkil, often simply Abdallah Mohammed (Arabic: محمد المتوكل السعدي) (died 4 August 1578) was the Sultan of Morocco from 1574 to 1576. He was the oldest son of Abdallah al-Ghalib and became Sultan after his father's death.

== Life ==
Immediately after his accession to the throne, he had one of his brothers executed and another (Mulay en-Naser, the governor of Tadla) imprisoned.

Abu Abdallah's uncle, Abd al-Malik, who, like his father Abdallah al-Ghalib, was a son of Mohammed ash-Sheikh, had fled to Constantinople in the Ottoman Empire in 1574. Meanwhile in Ottoman Algeria, Abd al-Malik succeeded in organising his own army, consisting of Ottoman soldiers, and in 1576 he invaded Morocco and conquered Fez from his nephew. The two sides fought a battle at al-Rukn in the lands of Banu waritin, near Fez and then fought again near Salé (Rabat) in Jandaq al-Rayhan. Each time Abd al-Malik defeated his nephew. A third battle, also won by Abd al-Malik, took place in Taroudant.

Both Abd al-Malik and Abu Abdallah died two years later during the Battle of Alcácer Quibir, in 1578. In that battle, Abu Abdallah fought against his uncle Abd al-Malik with the help of his Portuguese allies and European mercenaries.

== See also ==
- Muley Xeque, son.
- List of rulers of Morocco
- History of Morocco
- Saadi dynasty

== Notes ==
Preceded by Abdallah al-Ghalib	Saadi dynasty 1574–1576	Succeeded by Abu Marwan Abd al-Malik I
