= Abdallah al-Ghalib =

Saadi Dynasty ruler from 1557 to 1574

Abdallah al-Ghalib عبد الله الغالب

Saadi Sultan
- Reign: 1557–1574
- Predecessor: Mohammed al-Shaykh
- Successor: Abu Abdallah Mohammed
- Born: c. 1517; Marrakesh, Saadi Sultanate
- Died: 22 January 1574; Marrakesh, Saadi Sultanate
- Burial: January 1574; Saadian Tombs
- Issue: Abu Abdallah Mohammed II Saadi
Names
- Abdallah al-Ghalib bin Mohammed al-Shaykh
Era dates
- 16th Century
- House: Saadi Dynasty
- Father: Mohammed al-Shaykh
- Mother: Sayyida Rabia Al-Sâadiya of Tidsi
- Religion: Sunni Islam
- Military career
- Conflicts: Battle of Wadi al-Laban (1558)

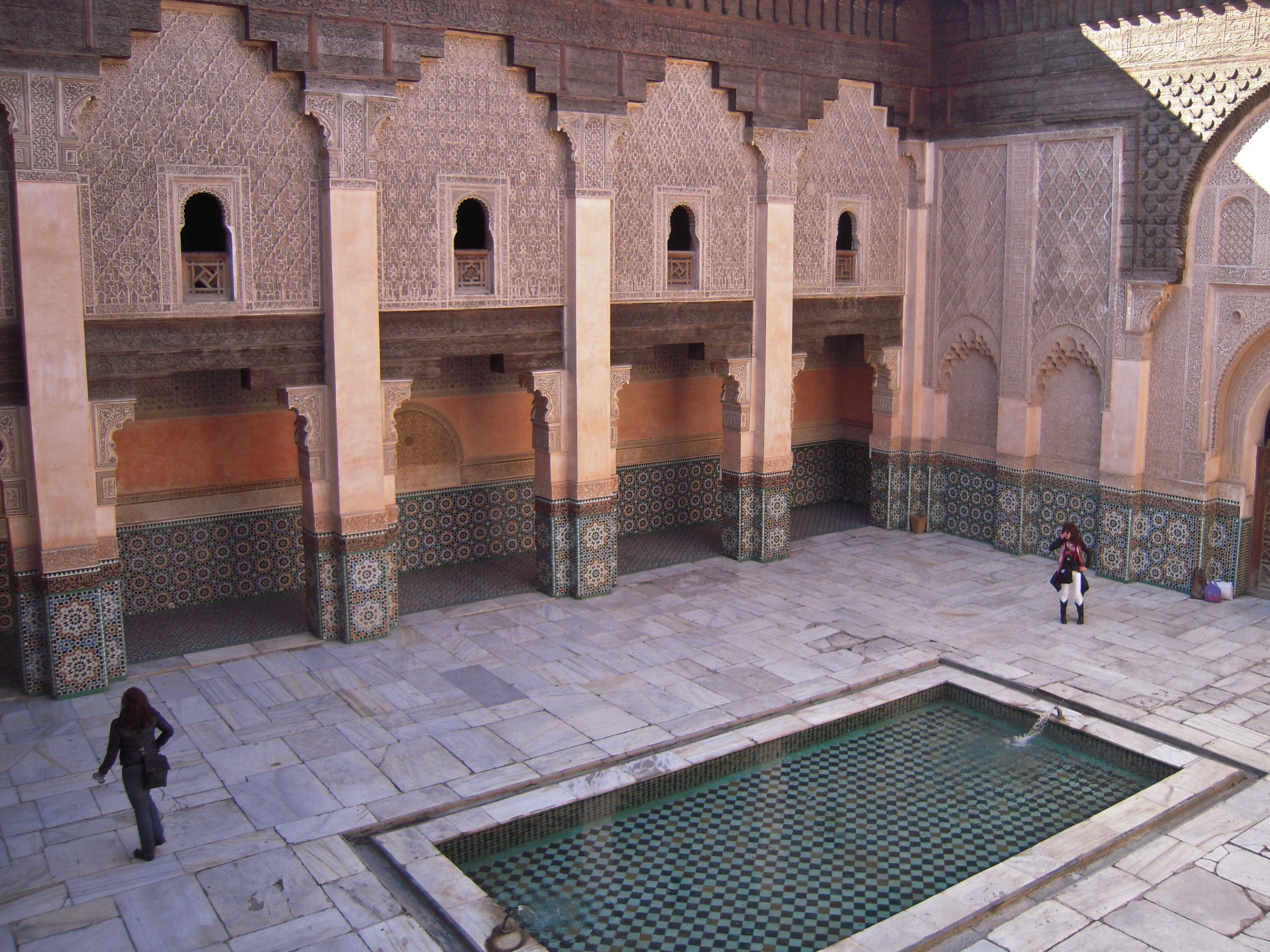
Abdallah al-Ghalib built the Ben Youssef Madrasa

Abdallah al-Ghalib Billah (Arabic: عبد الله الغالب; 1517 – 22 January 1574, r. 1557–1574) was the second Saadian sultan. He succeeded his father Muhammad al-Shaykh.

== Biography ==
=== Early life and accession ===
With his first wife, Sayyida Rabia, Muhammad al-Shaykh had three sons, but the two oldest had died while he was still alive (in 1550 and in 1551). Abdallah, the third, was 40 years old when he became sultan and received the name al-Ghalib Billah. Before that he had been vice-king of Marrakesh and governor of Fez.

Shortly after Abdallah came to power, three of his younger brothers fled the country and joined the Ottoman Turks. Abd al-Malik and Ahmad, both future Saadi sultans, spent 17 years in exile in the Ottoman Empire, moving between Algiers and Constantinople, where they were trained by the Ottomans.

=== Battle of Wadi al-Laban ===
He fought the invading Turks in 1558 at the Battle of Wadi al-Laban. The Ottomans then had to retreat because the Spaniards launched an expedition on Oran. The Saadi ruler formed an alliance with the Spanish against the Ottomans. After his victory, he even occupied Tlemcen for a short period. In 1568 he supported the insurrection of the Moriscos in Spain.

=== Architecture and construction projects ===
During his reign, Abdallah al-Ghalib Billah resided in Marrakesh. He was a prolific builder who was responsible for building, among other projects, the Mouassin Mosque, a maristan (a hospital usually attached to a mosque), and the Ben Youssef Medrassa. He repaired and restored the originally Almohad-built Kasbah Mosque and he is also believed to have begun the first mausoleum of the Saadian Tombs located behind the mosque.

== Death ==
Abdallah al-Ghalib Billah died on 22 January 1574 of an asthma attack. After his reign, a period of civil war was to follow that lasted four years. He was succeeded by his son, Abdallah Mohammed, despite a Saadian inheritance rule that decreed that the throne pass on to his eldest surviving brother, the exiled Abd al-Malik.

== See also ==
- List of rulers of Morocco
- History of Morocco

| Preceded by Mohammed ash-Sheikh | Saadi Dynasty; 1557–1574 | Succeeded by Abu Abdallah Mohammed II |
