= Mohammed al-Shaykh =

3rd Ruler of Saadi Dynasty

Mohammed al-Shaykh محمد الشيخ

Sultan of Morocco
- Reign: 1549–1557
- Predecessor: Ali Abu Hassun
- Successor: Abdallah al-Ghalib

Emir of Marrakesh
- Reign: 1544–1549
- Predecessor: Ahmad al-Araj
- Born: c. 1490
- Died: 23 October 1557; Morocco
- Burial: 1557; Saadian Tombs
- Spouse: Sayyida Rabia Al-Sâadiya of Tidsi; Sahaba al-Rehmania; Lalla Masuda al-Wizkitiya; Princess Lalla Halou al-Wattāsi (m.1550)
- Issue: Abdallah al-Ghalib; Lalla Maryam; Abd al-Mu'min; Lalla Fatima Zahra; Mohammed al-Harran; Abd al-Malik; Ahmad al-Mansur
Names
- Muhammad al-Shaykh bin Abu Abdallah al-Qaim
Era dates
- (15th–16th Centuries)
- Dynasty: Saadian dynasty
- Father: Abu Abdallah al-Qaim
- Religion: Sunni Islam

Mawlay Mohammed al-Shaykh al-Sharif al-Hassani (Arabic: محمد الشيخ الشريف الحسني), known as Mohammed al-Shaykh (Arabic: محمد الشيخ; b. c. 1490 – d. 23 October 1557), was the first sultan of the Saadian dynasty (1544–1557). He was particularly successful in expelling the Portuguese from most of their bases in Morocco. He also eliminated the Wattasids and resisted the Ottomans.

== Biography ==
=== War against the Wattasids and Portuguese ===
After the death of his father, Abu Abdallah al-Qaim in 1517, Mohammed al-Shaykh (together with his brother, Ahmad al-Araj) took command of the war of the Saadi against the Portuguese. They conquered Marrakesh in 1524. Ahmad became Emir of Marrakesh while still recognizing the Wattasid Sultan of Fez, and Mohammed remained as ruler of Taroudannt.

In 1527, the Treaty of Tadla was agreed upon between the Saadians and the Wattasids, following the Wattasid defeat in the Battle of Wadi al-Abid. Both dynasties agreed on their respective territorial control, which was separated by the Tadla region.

After 1536 and the rise in power of Ahmad, the brothers came into conflict with each other. Ahmad had in effect allied himself with the Wattasids under the regent Ali Abu Hassun (1524–54). Mohammed could maintain his position in Southern Morocco and conquered Agadir in 1541 and other coastal towns, ousting the Portuguese. After the loss of Agadir, the Portuguese immediately evacuated Azamor (which they held between 1513 and 1541) and Safi (1488–1541). While Ahmad fled to Tafilalet.

=== Relationship with the Andalusis ===
The Andalusi relationship with the Saadian Sultanate was not good, although the victories of Muhammad al-Shaykh against the Portuguese had a good impact on the Andalusis, who fully supported him as a man of jihad. Muhammad al-Shaykh tried to ally with the Ottoman Empire to save Al-Andalus, but his conflicts with the Andalusi stopped him from doing so.

=== War against the Ottomans ===
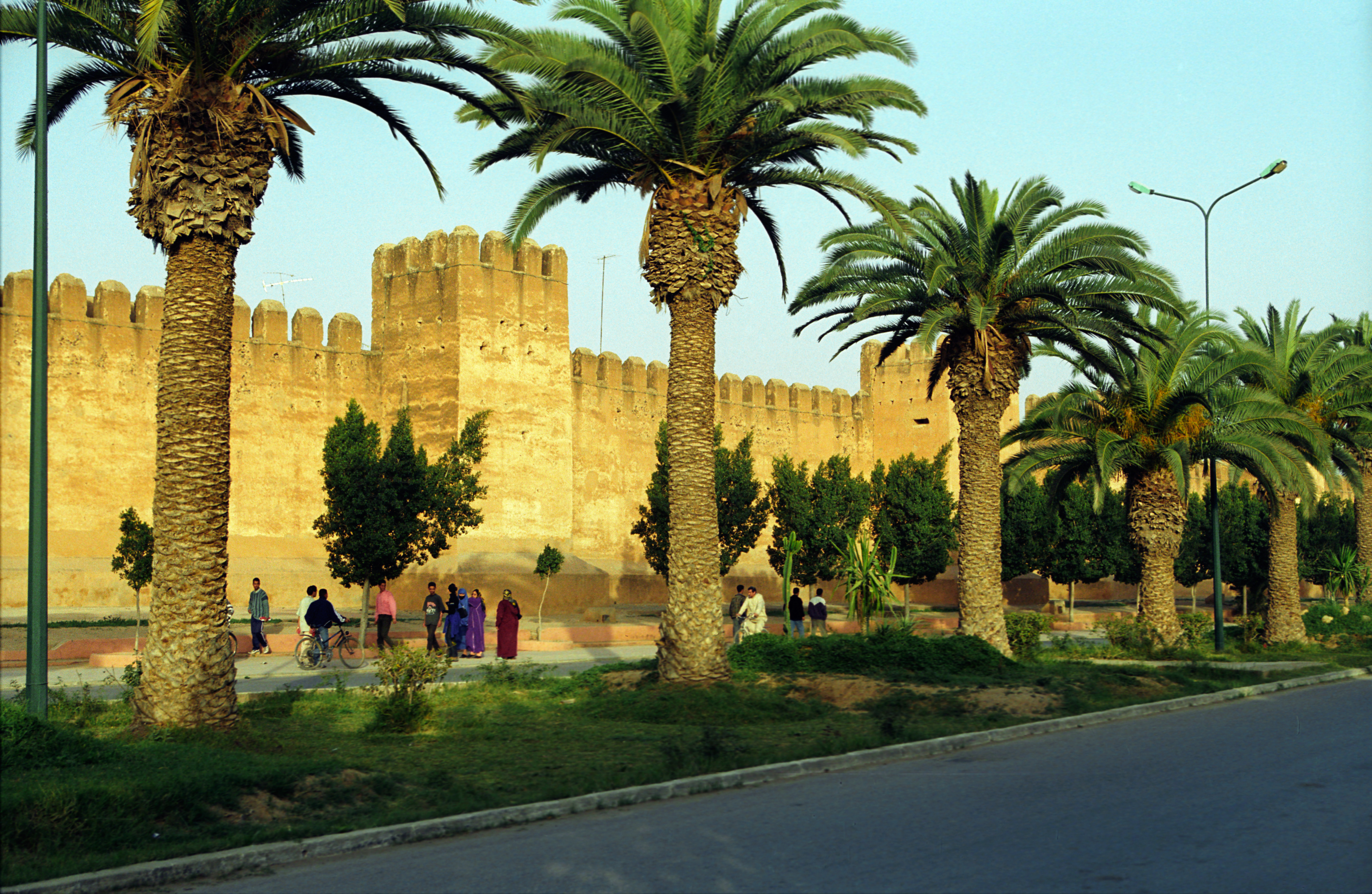
Mohammed al-Shaykh initially had his capital in the southern Moroccan city of Taroudannt, the walls of which he built. The capital was then moved to Marrakesh after its conquest in 1524.

After reorganizing his army after the Ottoman example, he succeeded in conquering Fez in 1549, causing the downfall of the Wattasids. In the conquest of Fez he again used European artillery, which he had also used in the Fall of Agadir in 1541. He then provided an army to his son, who was able to conquer Tlemcen in 1550, and throw out the Spanish-backed Zayyanid Sultan of Tlemcen.

After the fall of Fez, Ksar-el-Kebir and Asila; the Portuguese were ousted in 1550. Finally, only Ceuta (1415–1668), Tangier (1471–1661) and Mazagan (1502–1769) remained in Portuguese hands.

With help of the Ottomans, the Wattasids under Ali Abu Hassun were able to conquer Fez once more in early 1554; but that conquest was short-lived, and Mohammed al-Shaykh was able to vanquish the last Wattasids at the Battle of Tadla, and recapture the city of Fez in September 1554. During the Ottoman Siege of Oran (1556), Mohammed, who was allied with the Spanish, managed to capture Tlemcen from the Ottomans. With the final victory of the Saadians and the death of Ali Abu Hassun in 1554, the war was decided.

=== Death ===
Mohammed al-Shaykh was assassinated by the Ottomans in 1557 by order of Hasan Pasha, son of Hayreddin Barbarossa, as Mohammed was preparing for an alliance with Spain against the Ottomans. Some Ottoman soldiers had falsely entered into his service, claiming to be deserters, but later assassinated him. He was buried in the Saadian Tombs of Marrakesh. He was succeeded by his son Abdallah al-Ghalib, who successfully defeated the invading Turks in the Battle of Wadi al-Laban in 1558, who took advantage of Mohammed's assassination.

== Notes ==
Preceded by Ahmad al-Araj	Saadian dynasty 1544–1557	Succeeded by Abdallah al-Ghalib
