= List of wars involving the Ottoman Empire =

This is a list of wars involving the Ottoman Empire ordered chronologically, including civil wars within the empire.

The earliest form of the Ottoman military was a nomadic steppe cavalry force. This was centralized by Osman I from Turkoman tribesmen inhabiting western Anatolia in the late 13th century. Orhan I organized a standing army paid by salary rather than looting or fiefs. The Ottomans began using guns in the late 14th century.

The Ottoman Empire was the first of the three Islamic Gunpowder Empires, followed by Safavid Persia and Mughal India. By the 14th century, the Ottomans had adopted gunpowder artillery. By the time of Sultan Mehmed II, they had been drilled with firearms and became "perhaps the first standing infantry force equipped with firearms in the world." The Janissaries are thus considered the first modern standing army.

The Ottoman Classical Army was the military structure established by Mehmed II. The classical Ottoman army was the most disciplined and feared military force of its time, mainly due to its high level of organization, logistical capabilities and its elite troops. Following a century long reform efforts, this army was forced to disbandment by Sultan Mahmud II on 15 June 1826 by what is known as Auspicious Incident. By the reign of Mahmud the Second, the elite Janissaries had become corrupt and an obstacle in the way of modernization efforts, meaning they were more of a liability than an asset.

== Rise (1299–1453) ==
Ottoman victory
Ottoman defeat
Another result

Date	Conflict	Ottomans (and allies)	Opposition	Result
1284	Battle of Mount Armenia	Kayi tribe	Byzantium	Status quo ante bellum: Kayıs escape the raid without significant casualties.; Osman I besieges Kulaca Hisar as revenge.
1285	Siege of Kulaca Hisar	Kayi tribe	Byzantium	Kayi victory: The Kayi Tribe captures Kulucahisar Castle from the Byzantines; Foundation of the Ottoman Beylik
1287	Battle of Domaniç	Kayi tribe	Byzantium	Kayi victory: Attack repelled.; Byzantine commander Kalanoz killed in action.
1288	Siege of Karacahisar	Kayi tribe	Byzantium	Kayi victory: Karacahisar falls into the hands of the Kayi.
1299	Siege of İnegöl	Kayi tribe	Byzantium	Kayi victory
1302	Battle of Bapheus	Ottoman Beylik	Byzantine Empire	Ottoman victory: Koyunhisar and castles near Bursa fall to the Ottomans
1303	Battle of Dimbos	Ottoman Beylik	Byzantine Empire	Ottoman victory
1317/1326	Siege of Bursa	Ottoman Beylik	Byzantine Empire	Ottoman victory: The Ottomans capture Bursa and establish their first capital.; Bursa becomes the first official capital of the Ottoman Beylik.
1328–1331	Siege of Nicaea	Ottoman Beylik	Byzantine Empire	Ottoman victory
1337	Siege of Nicomedia	Ottoman Beylik	Byzantine Empire	Ottoman victory
1341–1347	Byzantine civil war of 1341–1347	(Byzantine Empire) John VI Kantakouzenos; Allies: (Serbian Empire) Serbia (1342–1343); Beylik of Aydin (1342/3–1345) Ottoman Beylik (1345–1347); Beylik of Saruhan; Principality of Albania; Principality of Muzaka	(Byzantine Empire) John V Palaiologos; Regents: (Byzantine Empire) Anna of Savoy (Byzantine Empire) John XIV Kalekas (Byzantine Empire) Alexios Apokaukos; Allies: Zealots of Thessalonica (Serbian Empire) Serbia (1343–1347); Bulgaria; Principality of Karvuna	Kantakouzenos victory: Serbia gained Macedonia and Albania, and soon after Epirus and Thessaly, establishing the Serbian Empire; Bulgaria gains northern Thrace.
1352–1357	Byzantine civil war of 1352–1357	(Byzantine Empire) John VI Kantakouzenos (Byzantine Empire) Matthew Kantakouzenos (POW); Allies: Ottoman Beylik	(Byzantine Empire) John V Palaiologos; Allies: (Serbian Empire) Serbian Empire; Second Bulgarian Empire; Republic of Venice; Republic of Genoa	Partial Defeat: John V Palaiologos becomes sole ruler, deposes the Kantakouzenoi; Byzantine ruled by John V Palaiologos
1354	Fall of Gallipoli	Ottoman Beylik	Byzantine Empire	Victory: Ottoman takeover of Gallipoli; John VI Kantakouzenos overthrown as Eastern Roman Emperor; Savoyard crusade; Europe becomes open to Turkish expansion
1355	Battle of Ihtiman	Ottoman Beylik	Second Bulgarian Empire	Stalemate: Heavy losses stall Ottoman advance on Bulgarian capital of Sofia, however Ottomans are able to inflict a crushing blow on Bulgarian.
1362 or 1369	Ottoman conquest of Adrianople	Ottoman Empire	Byzantine Empire	Victory: Adrianople becomes the New Capital of the Ottoman Empire
1364	Battle of Sırpsındığı	Ottoman Empire	Serbian Empire; Second Bulgarian Empire; Wallachia; Banate of Bosnia; Kingdom of Hungary Middle Ages	Victory: Ottomans conquer Adrianople and make it new capital
1366–1526	Hungarian–Ottoman Wars: Battle of Nicopolis; Siege of Golubac; Battle of Hermannstadt; Battle of Nish (1443); Battle of Zlatitsa; Battle of Kunovica; Battle of Varna; Battle of Kosovo (1448); Battle of Kruševac; Siege of Belgrade (1456); Siege of Jajce (1464); Battle of Zvornik (1464); Battle of Vaslui; Battle of Breadfield; Ottoman conquest of Otranto; Battle of Krbava Field; Siege of Belgrade (1521); Battle of Mohács	Ottoman Empire	Kingdom of Hungary: Kingdom of Croatia; Kingdom of Poland; Grand Duchy of Lithuania; Principality of Wallachia; Principality of Moldavia; European allies: Holy Roman Empire; Papal States; Crown of Aragon; Kingdom of Naples; Republic of Venice; Republic of Genoa; Bulgarian Empire; Kingdom of France; Knights of Rhodes; Kingdom of Bosnia; Moravian Serbia; Serbian Despotate; Duchy of Savoy; Kingdom of England; Teutonic Order; Byzantine Empire; Crown of Castile; Kingdom of Portugal; Kingdom of Navarre	Victory: Start of Ottoman–Habsburg wars; Destruction of the medieval Kingdom of Hungary and its partition between the Ottomans and the Habsburgs
1371	Battle of Samokov	Ottoman Empire	Second Bulgarian Empire; Moravian Serbia	Victory
1371	Battle of Maritsa	Ottoman Empire	Serbian Empire	Victory: Ottomans conquer parts of Macedonia and Thrace
1371	Byzantine civil war of 1373–79	(Byzantine Empire) John V Palaiologos; Ottoman Empire; Republic of Venice	(Byzantine Empire) Andronikos IV Palaiologos (Ottoman Empire) Savci Bey; Republic of Genoa	Victory: Byzantine Empire cedes Gallipoli to Ottomans and essentially become Ottoman vassals
1381–1384	Albanian-Epirote War (1381–84)	Despotate of Epirus in Ioannina; Ottoman Empire	Despotate of Arta	Defeat: Preljubović, leader of Epirus, appealed for help from the Ottomans and Frank's who provide the Epirotes with an auxiliary force.; Thomas Preljubović uses his new auxiliary to good use by capturing many fortresses in the Despotate of Arta, but Albanians under Gjon Shpata, together with the Mazarakii tribe held their defensive positions and ultimately defeated Thomas once again.
1382–1385	Zetan-Albania War	Princedom of Albania; Ottoman Empire	Lordship of Zeta	Victory: Zetan forces under Balša II capture the Princedom's capital, Durrës.; In 1385 Zetan Forces are defeated by Thopia with help of Ottoman forces in the Battle of Savra.; Thopia recaptures capital of Durrës and reestablished the Princedom of Albania.
1382–1393	Ottoman Conquest of Bulgaria	Ottoman Empire	Bulgarian Empire: Tsardom of Vidin	Victory: Ottomans conquer Bulgaria and the Second Bulgarian Empire falls in 1396
1385	First Zenebishi Uprising against the Ottomans	Ottoman Empire	Albanian Zenebishi Family	Defeat: Albanians under Gjon Zenebishi successfully capture the fortress of Gjirokastër.; The Principality of Gjirokastër is declared.
1385	Battle of Savra	Ottoman Empire; Albanian Thopia family	Principality of Zeta	Victory: Since the Ottomans were victorious, most of the local Serbian and Albanian lords became vassals. Immediately after this battle Thopia recaptured Durrës, probably under the Ottoman suzerainty. The Ottomans captured Krujë, Berat, and Ulcinj and soon retreated from them keeping only Kastoria under their permanent control.
1388	Battle of Bileća	Ottoman Empire	Kingdom of Bosnia	Defeat: Bosnians and Serbs ally against Ottoman threat, culminating in Battle of Kosovo
1389	Battle of Kosovo (1389)	Ottoman Empire	Moravian Serbia; District of Branković; Kingdom of Bosnia; Knights Hospitaller Albanian principalities	Unknown Result; Some sources claim Tactically Inconclusive whereas some claim Victory: Heavy losses on both sides devastate less numerous Serbs, while Ottomans are able to bring troops from the east.; Ottoman Sultan Murad I and Serbian Prince Lazar are killed and Bayezid I becomes new sultan.; Serbian lords eventually became vassals of the Ottomans.
1389–1390	Albanian-Epirote War of 1389–90	Despotate of Epirus (all four battles); Thessaly (second battle); Ottoman Empire (third and fourth battles)	Despotate of Arta (all four battles); Malakasi Tribe (second battle)	Victory: Albanian and Aromanian forces are defeated in four battles against Epirote, Thessalian and Ottoman forces around Jannina.; Albanian forces withdraw into the surrounding mountains
1390	Fall of Philadelphia	Ottoman Empire	Byzantine Empire	Victory: In 1390, Sultan Bayezid summoned the co-emperors of Byzantium, John VII and Manuel II and ordered them to accompany the besieging Turkish force to Philadelphia. The co-emperors submitted to the degradation, and Philadelphia surrendered when it saw the imperial banner hoisted among the horse-tails of the Turkish pashas above the camp of the besiegers. The humiliation of the empire could go no further than when the heir of Justinian and Basil Bulgaroktonos took the field at the behest of a Turkish Emir, in order to extinguish the last relics of freedom in his own country.
1391	Siege of Constantinople (1391)	Ottoman Empire	Byzantine Empire; Kingdom of Hungary	Stalemate: Ottomans retreat due to Hungarian invasion by Sigismund of Luxembourg.
1394–1395	Bayezid's Campaign against Wallachia	Ottoman Empire: Moravian Serbia	Wallachia	Tactical Defeat: Ottoman advance in Wallachia halted till Crusade of Nicopolis
1394–1395	Siege of Constantinople (1394–1402)	Ottoman Empire	Byzantine Empire; Crusade of Nicopolis; Kingdom of France; Republic of Venice	Siege pulled: Bayezid I is forced to march to Ankara to meet Timurid Amir Timur
1396	Crusade of Nicopolis	Ottoman Empire: Moravian Serbia	Holy Roman Empire: Bohemian Crown; Duchy of Savoy; Swiss Confederacy; Kingdom of France: Duchy of Burgundy; Kingdom of Hungary Middle Ages: Voivodship of Transylvania; Kingdom of Croatia; Principality of Wallachia; Knights Hospitaller; Republic of Venice; Republic of Genoa; Second Bulgarian Empire; Poland Middle Ages; Crown of Castile; Crown of Aragon; Kingdom of Portugal; Kingdom of Navarre; Teutonic Knights; Byzantine Empire	Victory: Ottomans defeat Crusades and no new Anti-Ottoman alliance is formed till the 1440s; Ottomans maintain pressure on Constantinople, tightened control over the Balkans, and became a greater threat to central Europe; Collapse of Second Bulgarian Empire
1399–1402	Ottoman-Timurid War: Sack of Sebaste; Siege of Ankara; Battle of Ankara	Ottoman Empire: Anatolian beyliks; Black Tatars Albanian principalities Moravian Serbia District of Branković Wallachia Co-belligerant: Mamluks Kingdom of Georgia Knights Hospitaller	Timurid Empire: Anatolian beyliks; Aq Qoyunlu Germiyanids	Defeat: Anatolian Beyliks got independence.; Bayezid I is captured by Timur and dies in captivity, leaving the Ottoman Empire without a sultan; Ottoman Interregnum begins; Ottoman Empire on the brink of collapse; Timurid conquests and invasions ends.
1402–1413	Ottoman Interregnum	(Ottoman Empire) Mehmed Çelebi; Serbian Despotate	(Ottoman Empire) İsa Çelebi (Ottoman Empire) Süleyman Çelebi; Byzantine Empire (Ottoman Empire) Musa Çelebi; Wallachia	Mehmed Victory: Mehmed Çelebi becomes Mehmed I; Ottoman Empire is re-united
1402	Battle of Tripolje	Ottoman Empire; District of Branković	Serbian Despotate	Defeat: The two sides clashed on 21 November 1402, at Tripolje, near the Gračanica Monastery. The date of the battle coincided with the Presentation of Mary. Lazarević divided his army into two groups. Constantine of Kostenets, Lazarević's biographer (ca. 1431), wrote that the army was divided between the two brothers, in case one fell the other would be saved and stay a "good shepherd of the flock". Lazarević assigned the larger group to his brother Vuk, while he took the smaller group. It is unknown whether the army that Balšić contributed as security was present at the battle. Branković enjoyed significant Ottoman support.
1404	Uprising of Konstantin and Fruzhin	(Ottoman Empire) Suleyman Çelebi	Prince Fruzhin; Tsar Konstantin II	Victory: Ottomans crush the Bulgarian revolt
1411	Siege of Constantinople (1411)	(Ottoman Empire) Musa Çelebi	Byzantine Empire (Ottoman Empire) Mehmed Çelebi	Defeat: Mehmet Celebi lifts the siege
1414	Ottoman-Gjirokastër War	Ottoman Empire	Albanian Zenebishi Family: Principality of Gjirokastër	Victory: Ottomans conquer the territory of the Principality.; Ruler of the Principality, Gjon Zenebishi, goes into exile in Corfu.
1416	Battle of Gallipoli (1416)	Ottoman Empire	Republic of Venice	Defeat: Pietro Loredan crushes the Ottoman fleet to ensure Venetian superiority in the Aegean for the next few decades
1416–1420	Revolt of Sheikh Bedreddin	Ottoman Empire	Sheikh Bedreddin	Victory: Sheikh Bedreddin's revolt is suppressed and he and his followers are executed
1418	Second Ottoman-Gjirokastër War	Ottoman Empire	Albanian Zenebishi Family: Principality of Gjirokastër	Victory: Ottomans successfully besiege Gjirokastër and reconquer the territory of the Principality.; Ruler of the Principality, Depë Zenebishi, goes into exile in Corfu.
1422	Siege of Constantinople (1422)	Ottoman Empire	Byzantine Empire	Defeat: Murad II forced to suppress the revolt of his younger brother, Küçük Mustafa
1422–1430	Siege of Thessalonica	Ottoman Empire	Byzantine Empire Republic of Venice	Victory: Ottomans capture Thessalonica
1421–1522	2nd Conquest of Anatolia	Ottoman Empire	Beylik of Karaman; Beylik of Isfendiyar; Beylik of Aydin; Empire of Trebizond; Sultanate of Eretna; Beylik of Teke; Byzantine Empire; Beyliks of Canik; Beylik of Germiyan; Beylik of Menteşe; Beylik of Karasi; Beylik of Saruhan	Victory: Ottomans conquer Anatolia
1426–1428	Ottoman-Hungarian War of 1426–1428	Ottoman Empire	Kingdom of Hungary Middle Ages; Serbian Despotate; Wallachia Transylvania; Kingdom of Bosnia; Grand Duchy of Lithuania	Inconclusive: The Kingdom of Hungary recognized the Ottoman annexation of Alacahisar and Güvercinlik and their rule over the Serbian Despotate and the Wallachian Voivodeship
1428	Siege of Golubac	Ottoman Empire	Kingdom of Hungary Middle Ages; Wallachia; Grand Duchy of Lithuania	Victory: Serbia becomes vassal state of the Ottoman Empire; Ottomans invade Bosnia
1432–1436	Albanian Revolt of 1432–1436	Ottoman Empire	Various Albanian rebels	Victory: Suppression of Revolt. Restoration of Ottoman Rule in Albania
1432–1479	Albanian–Ottoman Wars (1432–1479): Battle of Torvioll; Battle of Mokra (1445); Battle of Otonetë; Siege of Svetigrad; Battle of Oranik (1448); Siege of Krujë (1450); Battle of Polog; Siege of Berat (1455); Battle of Oranik (1456); Battle of Albulena; Battle of Mokra (July 1462); Skanderbeg's Macedonian campaign; Battle of Ohrid; Battle of Vaikal; Ballaban's campaign of 1465; Siege of Krujë (1466–1467); Siege of Krujë (1467); Siege of Shkodra (1474); Siege of Krujë (1478); Siege of Shkodra	Ottoman Empire	1443–44: Kastrioti Family; Arianiti Family 1444–46: League of Lezhë 1446–50: League of Lezhë; Angevin Kingdom of Naples: State of Arianiti; 1450–51: Albanians under Skanderbeg; Muzaka Lordship Angevin Kingdom of Naples: State of Arianiti; 1451–54: Angevin Kingdom of Naples: Principality of Kastrioti; State of Arianiti; Muzaka Lordship; 1454–56: Angevin Kingdom of Naples: Principality of Kastrioti; Principality of Dukagjini; Muzaka Lordship 1456–68: Angevin Kingdom of Naples: Principality of Kastrioti; Principality of Dukagjini; Muzaka Lordship; Republic of Venice: State of Arianiti; 1468–78: Angevin Kingdom of Naples: Principality of Kastrioti; Principality of Dukagjini; 1478–79: Angevin Kingdom of Naples: Principality of Dukagjini; Republic of Venice: State of Arianiti; Albanian resistance forces; Lordship of Zeta (Siege of Shkodra only)	Victory: Resistance weakens after Skanderbeg's death; Shkodër falls in 1479
1440	Siege of Belgrade (1440)	Ottoman Empire	Kingdom of Hungary; Serbian Despotate	Defeat
1440–1441	Siege of Novo Brdo	Ottoman Empire	Serbian Despotate	Victory: During the siege of Novo Brdo its population suffered heavy casualties. On 27 June 1441 Novo Brdo surrendered to the Ottoman forces, who then robbed and burned the captured town.
1443–1444	Crusade of Varna	Ottoman Empire	Poland Middle Ages; Kingdom of Hungary Middle Ages; Kingdom of Croatia; Grand Duchy of Lithuania; Serbian Despotate; Crown of Bohemia; Principality of Wallachia; Bulgarian rebels Kingdom of Bosnia; Papal States; Teutonic Knights; Duchy of Burgundy; Republic of Venice; Republic of Ragusa	Victory: Ottomans halt European attempt to check their rapid expansion
1447–1448	Albanian–Venetian War	Ottoman Empire Republic of Venice	League of Lezhë	Defeat: The League of Lezhë gains all lands on the Albanian side of the Drin River
1448	Battle of Kosovo (1448)	Ottoman Empire	Kingdom of Hungary Middle Ages; Poland Middle Ages; Principality of Wallachia; Principality of Moldavia	Victory: Defeat of the European Crusaders; Balkans slowly fall to the Ottomans; Mehmed II free to siege Constantinople
1453	Fall of Constantinople	Ottoman Empire	Byzantine Empire; Genoese volunteers Venetian volunteers Sicilian volunteers Papal States (Ottoman Empire) Ottoman defectors	Victory: Constantinople is conquered by the Ottomans and becomes new Ottoman capital; Morea and Trebizond continue as Byzantine rump states, until their conquest in 1460 and 1461 respectively; Ottoman Empire proclaimed successor to the Roman Empire; Beginning of the Classical Age (1453–1566)

== Classical Age (1453–1566) ==
Date	Conflict	Ottomans (and allies)	Opposition	Result
1454	Battle of Leskovac	Ottoman Empire	Serbian Despotate	Defeat: Skobaljić on November 16, 1454, defeating his army at Tripolje (near Novo Brdo), where Voivode Nikola and his men fought to the last man, inflicting disproportionately large casualties on the Ottoman force.
1454	Battle of Kruševac	Ottoman Empire	Serbian Despotate	Defeat: Nikola Skobaljić continued his forays against the Ottomans, operating between Leskovac and Priština, and won several major victories against the armies of the sultan.
1455	Siege of Trepča	Ottoman Empire	Serbian Despotate	Victory: Mehmed directed his forces towards Southern Serbia in 1455. He captured the Trepça, Novo Brdo and silver mines.
1455	Siege of Novo Brdo (1455)	Ottoman Empire	Serbian Despotate	Victory: The notables of the city were executed; 320 young men were recruited into the Janissaries and 700 Serbian women were enlisted into the army. The roof of St. Nicholas Church, popularly known as the Saxon church, was removed along with its bells. In 1467, the rest of the people were taken to Istanbul. The Ottoman colony established in the conquered city could not prevent its cultural and economic decline. Novo Brdo, which became noteworthy as the eventual site of an Ottoman mint, maintained its importance until the reign of Murad IV
1455	Siege of Berat (1455)	Ottoman Empire	League of Lezhë	Victory: Berat falls to the Ottomans
1456	Siege of Belgrade (1456)	Ottoman Empire	Kingdom of Hungary Middle Ages; Serbian Despotate; Crusader peasant and local gentry recruits	Defeat: John Hunyadi repels the Ottomans; Mehmed II's advance into Central Europe halted
1459	Siege of Smederevo (1459)	Ottoman Empire	Serbian Despotate	Victory: The fall of Smederevo led to the surrender of all the small forts in northern Serbia. By the end of 1459, all of Serbia was under Mehmed's control, with some 200,000 Serbian captives, thus beginning more than 400 years of Ottoman rule.
1460	Siege of Amasra	Ottoman Empire	Republic of Genoa	Victory: Annexation of Amasra by the Ottoman Empire
1461	Siege of Trebizond (1461)	Ottoman Empire	Empire of Trebizond	Victory: Ottomans conquer Empire of Trebizond
1462	Night attack at Târgoviște	Ottoman Empire	Wallachia	Inconclusive: Failure of Wallachian attempt to assassinate Mehmed II; Vlad III impales over 20,000 Turks
1462	Ottoman conquest of Lesbos	Ottoman Empire	Gattilusio lordship of Lesbos; Knights Hospitaller	Victory: Ottomans conquer the island of Lesbos
1463–1479	First Ottoman-Venetian war	Ottoman Empire	Republic of Venice; Papal States; League of Lezhë; Principality of Zeta; Kingdom of Hungary (Sovereign Military Order of Malta) Knights Hospitaller; Crown of Aragon; Kingdom of Naples; Aq Qoyunlu; Duchy of Burgundy; Holy Roman Empire; Principality of Moldavia; Kingdom of Croatia; Duchy of Saint Sava; Kingdom of France; Republic of Ragusa; Grand Duchy of Lithuania; Crown of Castile; Florence; Karamanids; Maniots; Greek rebels	Victory: Ottomans conquer the Morea, Negroponte and Albania from Venetians
1463	Siege of Jajce	Ottoman Empire	Kingdom of Hungary Middle Ages; Republic of Venice; Kingdom of Bosnia; Republic of Ragusa (logistics, goods); Bohemian (Hussite) mercenaries	Victory: Collapse of the Kingdom of Bosnia
1473	Battle of Otlukbeli	Ottoman Empire	Aq Qoyunlu	Victory: Aq Qoyunlu power nearly wiped out in the East, paving way for Shah Ismail I of the Safavids to take over Persia
1475–76	Moldavian War of Mehmed II	Ottoman Empire; Wallachia	Moldavia	Defeat: Mehmet II fails to follow up his victory at Valea Albă during siege of Neamț Citadel; Mehmet's son Bayezid continues the war with the Moldavians in 1484
1475	Crimean Campaign (1475)	Ottoman Empire	Republic of Genoa	Victory: The process that started with the conquest of the Anatolian coast of the Black Sea continued with Crimea on the opposite shore, and during the reign of Mehmed the Conqueror, the Black Sea became a Turkish lake.
1479	Battle of Breadfield	Ottoman Empire	Kingdom of Hungary Middle Ages; Serbian Despotate; Wallachia	Defeat: Ottoman raids into Hungary halted
1480	First Ottoman siege of Rhodes	Ottoman Empire	(Sovereign Military Order of Malta) Knights Hospitaller	Defeat: Ottomans fail to conquer Rhodes
1480–1481	Invasion of Otranto	Ottoman Empire	Kingdom of Naples; Crown of Aragon; Kingdom of Sicily; Kingdom of Hungary; Papal States; Kingdom of Portugal	Defeat: Ottomans conquer Otranto and gain foothold in Southern Italy; Ottoman garrison surrender the city after 13 months
1481–1484	Albanian Uprisings of 1481–1484	Ottoman Empire	Albanian rebels Kastrioti family Dukagjini Family; Muzaka family	Inconclusive: Albanian forces under Nicholas Pal Dukagjini and Lekë Dukagjini land on the north Albanian coastline in early Summer 1481, sparking rebellion in former Dukagjini territories. Lezhë and Shkodër are attacked, forcing Ottomans to send reinforcements.; Meanwhile, Gjon Kastrioti II lands in Durrës, gathering support from 7,000 Albanian infantrymen, and his cousin Konstandin Muzaka lands in the coastal region around Himara. Rebellion breaks out in Central and Southern Albania.; Forces under Gjon Kastrioti defeat a force of 2,000 to 3,000 Ottomans in August 1481 and capture Himara and Borsh Castle.; Rebellion in Northern, Central and Southern Albania prevents Ottomans from sending reinforcements to Italy, resulting in Otranto being recaptured by Christian forces in September 1481.; The rebellions are eventually crushed, and Gjon Kastrioti retreats to Italy in 1484.
1484–1486	Moldavian War of Bayezid II	Ottoman Empire; Wallachia	Moldavia	Victory: Ottomans conquer Chilia and Akkerman
1484–1486	Mamluk War of Bayezid II	Ottoman Empire	Mamluks	Stalemate: Ottoman incursions into Cilicia halted
1485–1503	Polish–Ottoman War (1485–1503)	Ottoman Empire; Crimean Khanate; Moldavia	Poland Middle Ages; Duchy of Masovia; Teutonic Knights; Grand Duchy of Lithuania	Victory: Polish King Aleksander Jagiellonczyk forced to sign truce with Ottomans
1490–1494	War of the Hungarian Succession	Ottoman Empire	John Corvinus Vladislaus John Albert Maximilian I, Holy Roman Emperor	Victory: Near elimination of Croatian Nobility at Krbava Field; Eventual Ottoman expansion into Croatia
1492–1792	Spanish–Ottoman wars: Algiers expedition (1516); Algiers expedition (1519); Capture of Peñón of Algiers; Battle of Formentera; Siege of Coron; Conquest of Tunis (1534); Conquest of Tunis (1535); Sack of Mahón; Siege of Castelnuovo; Battle of Preveza; Battle of Girolata; Algiers expedition; Siege of Tripoli (1551); Capture of Béjaïa (1555); Siege of Oran (1556); Raid of the Balearic islands (1558); Expedition to Mostaganem (1558); Battle of Djerba; Great Siege of Malta; Capture of Tunis (1569); Battle of Lepanto; Conquest of Tunis (1574); Battle of Cape Corvo; Battle of Cape Gelidonya	Ottoman Empire: Regency of Algiers; (Ottoman Empire) Regency of Tunis; Tripolitania; (Ottoman Empire) Ottoman Egypt; (Bosnia Eyalet) Eyalet of Bosnia; France (until 1538)	Spanish Empire: Kingdom of Naples; Kingdom of Sicily; Duchy of Milan; Kingdom of Portugal; (Spanish Empire) Plazas de soberanía; Hafsid Kingdom; Kingdom of Tlemcen; Holy Roman Empire: Archduchy of Austria; Kingdom of Bohemia; Duchy of Bavaria; Duchy of Burgundy Duchy of Savoy; (Sovereign Military Order of Malta) Malta; Republic of Genoa; Republic of Florence; Papal States Republic of Venice Kingdom of Hungary: Kingdom of Croatia	In North Africa Ottoman victory In Italian peninsula Spanish victory In Mediterranean Inconclusive: Algeria, Tunisia and Libya became Ottoman territory
1493–1593	Hundred Years' Croatian–Ottoman War: Battle of Una; Battle of Vrpile; Battle of Krbava Field; Battle of Dubica; Battle of Jajce (1518); Siege of Knin; Battle of Mohács; Siege of Güns; Siege of Klis; Katzianer's Campaign; Battle of Hrastovica (1561); Battle of Obreška; Siege of Krupa; Siege of Szigetvár; Siege of Gvozdansko; Battle of Slunj; Siege of Bihać (1592); Battle of Brest (1592); Battle of Sisak	Ottoman Empire	Until 1526: Kingdom of Croatia; Kingdom of Hungary From 1527: Habsburg Monarchy: Kingdom of Croatia; Kingdom of Hungary; Duchy of Carniola; Serbian Despotate	Inconclusive: Ottoman Empire conquered areas of Kingdom of Croatia between Vrbas river and Kupa river. Their advance was conclusively halted in 1593 in Third Battle of Sisak. The remaining land remained under the control of Kingdom of Croatia.; Kingdom of Croatia reduced to "Remnants of the remnants"; Croatia joins Habsburg Monarchy; Formation of Military Frontier; Start of the Long Turkish War
1497–1499	Moldavian Campaign	Ottoman Empire	Kingdom of Poland	Victory: Ottoman vassal Moldavia gets Pokuttia; Ottomans raid Red Ruthenia and Podolia, reaching as far as Przeworsk
1499–1503	Second Ottoman-Venetian War	Ottoman Empire	Republic of Venice; Spanish Empire	Victory: Venetian strongholds of Modon and Coron fall to the Ottomans; Cephalonia and Ithaca are taken by Venice
1505–1517	Mamluk–Portuguese conflicts: Battle of Cannanore; Battle of Diu; Portuguese conquest of Goa; Siege of Jeddah	Mamluk Sultanate Indian states: Gujarat Sultanate; Bijapur Sultanate; Calicut kingdom; Kannur; Supported by: Republic of Venice Ottoman Empire	Portuguese Empire Supported by: Safavid Empire	Defeat: Portuguese Indian Armadas got the dominance of the Indian Ocean trade in detritment of Muslims and Arabs; Establishment of Portuguese India
1505–1517	Ottoman–Persian wars (1505–1517): Şahkulu rebellion; Battle of Chaldiran; Battle of Tabriz (1514); Battle of Ovacık (1515); Siege of Harput (1516); Battle of Koçhisar (1516); Siege of Mosul (1517)	Ottoman Empire	Safavid Empire	Victory: Eastern Anatolia and Northern Iraq annexed by Ottomans
1507–1542	Ajuran-Portuguese wars	Ajuran Sultanate Ottoman Empire	Portuguese Empire	Defeat: Portuguese retake Pate, Mombasa and Kilwa from Somali/Ottoman forces.
1508	Georgian campaign (1508)	Ottoman Empire	Kingdom of Imereti	Victory: Imereti and Guria subjugated by the Ottomans
1508–1573	Gujarati–Portuguese conflicts: Battle of Diu (1509); Siege of Diu (1531); Siege of Diu (1538)	Gujarat Sultanate Supported by: Mamluks; Kingdom of Calicut; Ottoman Empire	Portuguese Empire: Portuguese India	Defeat: Establishment of Portuguese Diu. Ottomans and Gujarati fail to relieve Diu and Portugal keeps control of the port; Treaty of Bassein (1534); Establishment of Portuguese Bassein; Establishment of Portuguese Daman
1509–1513	Ottoman Civil War (1509–13)	(Ottoman Empire) Şehzade Selim	(Ottoman Empire) Şehzade Ahmet Şahkulu: Safavid Empire	Victory for Selim: Şehzade Selim becomes Selim I; Şehzade Ahmet puts down Şahkulu's rebellion; Selim executes Ahmet and relations between Ottomans and Safavids worsen
1515	Battle of Turnadağ	Ottoman Empire	Beylik of Dulkadir	Victory: After the battle, Beylik of Dulkadir ceased to exist. It was converted to an Ottoman sanjak, (Ottoman administrative unit). The first governor of the sanjak became Ali Bey of the Dulkadir. Hadim Sinan Pasha was promoted to be the grand vizier. The next year, Selim I waged a war against Egypt, and Egypt as well as Syria and Palestine came under the Ottoman rule.
1516–1517	Second Ottoman-Mamluk War	Ottoman Empire	Mamluks	Victory: Ottomans take over the entire Mamluk Sultanate, including Cairo, Mecca, Aleppo and Damascus; Ottoman Sultans become Caliphs of the Islamic world and the most powerful Muslim leader
1517	Siege of Jeddah	Ottoman Empire; Mamluks	Portuguese Empire	Victory: End of Portuguese blockade in Red Sea; Jeddah, the remaining stronghold of the Mamluk sultanate, is captured by Selim I
1518	Fall of Tlemcen	Ottoman Empire	Kingdom of Tlemcen	Victory: Ottoman Corsair Oruç Reis in control of territory size of 1916 French Algeria
1519–1610	Celali rebellions	Ottoman Empire	Celali	Victory: The rebellions were suppressed bloodily
1519–1639	Acehnese–Portuguese conflicts: Battle of Perlis River; Ottoman embassy to Aceh; Siege of Malacca (1568); Battle of Duyon River	Aceh Sultanate Supported by: Ottoman Empire; Sultanate of Kalinyamat; Sultanate of Golkonda; Dutch East India Company	Portuguese Empire: Portuguese India; Portuguese Malacca; Supported by: Kingdom of Aru; Sultanate of Johor; Sultanate of Kedah; Sultanate of Pasai; Sultanate of Pedir; Sultanate of Perak; Sultanate of Perlis	Inconclusive
1521	3rd Ottoman Siege of Belgrade	Ottoman Empire	Kingdom of Hungary Middle Ages	Victory: Suleiman I conquers the Hungarian stronghold of Belgrade, exposing the weakness of the Hungarian Nobility, something he would exploit at Mohács
1521	Siege of Šabac (1521)	Ottoman Empire	Kingdom of Hungary	Victory: In 1520 Suleiman the Magnificent ascended to the throne. The Ottomans under the leadership of Ahmed Pasha conquered the fortress of Šabac on 7 July 1521. In the conquest. All of its defenders were killed. After its conquest Suleiman said that it was one of the cities he had conquered and that it must be improved. He ordered towers to be built around the fortress and a moat around it filled with water from Sava. Suleiman spent 10 full days on the Sava at Šabac overseeing the construction of the pontoon bridge.
1522	2nd Ottoman Siege of Rhodes	Ottoman Empire	(Sovereign Military Order of Malta) Knights Hospitaller; Republic of Venice	Victory: Ottoman Empire annexes Rhodes; Knights move initially to Sicily, but then to Malta, Gozo, and Tripoli; Ottoman supremacy over trade in the Eastern Mediterranean is secured
1523	Expedition to Kamaran	Ottoman Empire	Portuguese Empire	Victory: In 1523 under the orders of Kanuni, Captain Selman Reis went on an expedition in the Red Sea. During this expedition Selman Reis discovered that the Kamaran Island was occupied by the Portuguese. The Portuguese used their base to raid the coast of Arabia, Salman Reis and Husayn al Rumi had an Ottoman force composed of 4,000 men. After their arrival in Yemen, the Ottomans attacked the Portuguese which resulted in the complete destruction and expulsion of Portuguese forces and the occupation of the island by the Ottomans.
1526	Battle of Mohács	Ottoman Empire: Crimean Khanate	Kingdom of Hungary Middle Ages Kingdom of Croatia; Crown of Bohemia; Holy Roman Empire; Duchy of Bavaria; Papal States	Victory: End of Ottoman–Hungarian wars; Start of Ottoman–Habsburg wars; Collapse and partition of Medieval Hungary and Hungary never regained its former political power; End of Middle Ages in Central Europe
1526–1791	Ottoman–Habsburg wars In Hungary and Balkans: Hungarian campaign of 1527–1528; Balkan campaign of 1529; Little War in Hungary; Siege of Vienna; Siege of Szigetvár; Long Turkish War; Austro-Turkish War (1663–1664); Great Turkish War; Austro-Turkish War (1716–1718); Russo-Turkish War (1735–1739); Austro-Turkish War (1788–1791); In Mediterranean: Battle of Formentera; Siege of Coron; Conquest of Tunis (1535); Sack of Mahón; Siege of Castelnuovo; Battle of Girolata; Battle of Alboran; Algiers expedition; Capture of Mahdia; Siege of Oran; Ottoman raid of the Balearic islands; Battle of Djerba; Sieges of Oran and Mers El Kébir; Great Siege of Malta; Battle of Lepanto; Conquest of Tunis (1574); Battle of Cape Corvo; Battle of Cape Celidonia	Ottoman Empire Vassals: Moldavia; Transylvania; Wallachia; Cossack Hetmanate (Doroshenko's faction); Crimean Khanate	Habsburg Dynasty: Holy Roman Empire: Archduchy of Austria; Kingdom of Bohemia; Republic of Genoa; Kingdom of Hungary: Kingdom of Croatia; Spanish Empire; Non-Habsburg allies: Moldavia; Transylvania; Wallachia; Tsardom of Russia; Cossack Hetmanate (Muscovite and Polish vassals); Holy League Allies: Polish–Lithuanian Commonwealth; Duchy of Mantua; Republic of Venice (Sovereign Military Order of Malta) Order of Saint John	Inconclusive End of Ottoman expansion: Decline of both the Ottoman and Habsburg empires; Prolonged military conflict contributed to decline of both Ottomans and Habsburgs which caused significant shift in the balance of power from both of these empires to the emerging France, Britain and Russia
1527–28	Hungarian Campaign of Ferdinand I	Ottoman Empire; Moldavia; Eastern Hungarian Kingdom	Habsburg Austria; Holy Roman Empire; Kingdom of Bohemia; Kingdom of Croatia; Royal Hungary; Rascians	Defeat: Austria occupies Győr, Komárom, Esztergom, Buda, and Székesfehérvár while Suleiman takes no action immediately despite his vassals' pleas
1529	Hungarian Campaign of Suleiman I	Ottoman Empire; Moldavia; Eastern Hungarian Kingdom	Habsburg Austria; Holy Roman Empire; Kingdom of Bohemia; Kingdom of Croatia; Royal Hungary; Rascians	Victory: Ottomans re-occupy Győr, Komárom, Esztergom, and Buda, reversing all of Ferdinand I's gains in his invasion of Hungary the previous year
1529–43	Ethiopian–Adal War	Adal Sultanate Ottoman Empire	Ethiopian Empire Portuguese Empire (1541–43)	Stalemate and Status quo ante bellum: Withdrawal of the few remaining Adal-Ottoman troops from the Ethiopian Highlands after the death of Ahmad ibn Ibrahim al-Ghazi.
1529	1st Ottoman siege of Vienna	Ottoman Empire: Moldavia	Holy Roman Empire: Kingdom of Bohemia; Electorate of the Palatinate; Spanish Empire; Kabyle soldiers	Defeat: Suleiman fails to conquer Vienna; Ferdinand unable to counter-attack after Suleiman lays waste to Styria and Habsburg Hungary
1530–52	Little War in Hungary	Ottoman Empire Moldavia; Eastern Hungarian Kingdom; Wallachia; Supported by: France	Holy Roman Empire: Habsburg Austria; Kingdom of Bohemia; Royal Hungary; Kingdom of Croatia; Spain; Papal States	Victory: Hungary divided into larger Ottoman and smaller Habsburg spheres of influence, as well as a semi-independent Ottoman vassal state of Transylvania
1532–55	2nd Ottoman–Safavid War	Ottoman Empire	Safavid Empire	Victory: Ottomans gain large parts of Mesopotamia, Western Kurdistan, Western Armenia, and Western Georgia; Persians retain Tabriz, Eastern Georgia, Eastern Armenia, Eastern Kurdistan, Dagestan, and Azerbaijan and the rest of their north-western borders as they were prior to the war; Erzurum, Van, and Shahrizor become buffer zones; Kars is declared a neutral zone
1533	Expedition of Irakeyn	Ottoman Empire	Safavid Empire	Victory: Although the Ottoman army reached Sultaniye under difficult conditions, they could not find any trace of the Shah. From here, the Ottoman army headed towards Baghdad, struggling with the difficult terrain and climatic conditions. Baghdad was easily captured by the Ottoman forces on November 28, 1534, after the Safavid forces under the command of Tekelü Mehmed Khan, who were defending Baghdad, fled the city.
1534	Ottoman conquest of Tunis	Ottoman Empire	Hafsid dynasty	Victory: Tunis captured by Barbarossa
1535	Habsburgian conquest of Tunis	Ottoman Empire; Kingdom of France	Holy Roman Empire: Republic of Genoa; County of Flanders; Habsburg Spain: Kingdom of Naples; Kingdom of Sicily; Hafsid dynasty Kingdom of Portugal; Papal States; Knights of Malta	Defeat: Muley Hassan of the Hafsid dynasty restored as client ruler of Tunis and Spanish-Imperial tributary.
1536–38	Italian War of 1536–1538	Ottoman Empire Regency of Algiers; Kingdom of France	Holy Roman Empire; Spain	Inconclusive: Franco-Ottoman alliance strengthened and Charles V forced to negotiate peace to avoid two-front war; Spain strengthens control over Italy; Holy Roman Emperor Charles V loses to Ottomans at Preveza
1536–37	Siege of Klis	Ottoman Empire	Kingdom of Croatia; Holy Roman Empire; Papal States	Victory: Ottomans take Klis
1537–40	Third Ottoman-Venetian war	Ottoman Empire; Regency of Algiers France	Holy League: Republic of Venice; Spanish Empire: Kingdom of Naples; Kingdom of Sicily; Republic of Genoa; Papal States (Sovereign Military Order of Malta) Knights of Malta	Victory: Venice loses most foreign possessions and can no longer take on the Ottoman navy
1538–1560	Ottoman–Portuguese conflicts (1538–1557): Siege of Diu (1538); Battle of Suakin (1541); Attack on Jeddah (1541); Battle of El Tor; Battle of Suez (1541); Ethiopian–Adal War; Capture of Aden (1548); Siege of Qatif (1551); Ottoman campaign against Hormuz; Battle of the Strait of Hormuz (1553); Battle of the Gulf of Oman; Red Sea Campaign (1556); Ottoman expeditions to Indian Ocean	Ottoman Empire: (Ottoman Empire) Ottoman Egypt; (Ottoman Empire) Ottoman Arabia; Gujarat Sultanate Adal Sultanate	Portuguese Empire: Portuguese India; Kingdom of Hormuz; Ethiopian Empire	Stalemate: Portugal maintains control of the Persian Gulf; Ottomans expand their influence in the Red Sea, annexing Yemen and the west bank of the Red Sea (coastal strip of Sudan and Eritrea)
1542–46	Italian War of 1542–1546	Ottoman Empire Regency of Algiers; France: (Old Swiss Confederacy) Swiss mercenaries Jülich-Cleves-Berg	Holy Roman Empire: Saxony; Brandenburg; Spain; Kingdom of England	Inconclusive: No territorial changes for Ottomans; Barbarossa increases Ottoman control over the Mediterranean with the Sack of Nice
1543	Battle of Karagak	Ottoman Empire	Kingdom of Imereti: Principality of Guria	Defeat
1545	Battle of Sokhoista	Ottoman Empire	Kingdom of Imereti; Kingdom of Kartli; Principality of Guria	Victory: The victory at Sokhoista gave to the Ottomans the upper hand in southwestern Caucasus and allowed them to overrun Samtskhe, where they installed their protégé, atabek Kaikhosro III. Tortum, İspir, and Pasin were detached from Samtskhe and annexed to the Ottoman Empire.
1547	Ottoman invasion of Guria	Ottoman Empire	Principality of Guria	Victory: Ottomans conquer Adjara
1551–1559	Spanish-Ottoman War (1550–1560): Capture of Mahdia; Siege of Tripoli; Campaign of Tlemcen (1551); Capture of Béjaïa; Raid of the Balearic islands; Expedition to Mostaganem; Battle of Djerba; Part of German-Ottoman war 1550–1562, Spanish-Ottoman Wars of 1515–1577 and Conflicts between the Regency of Algiers and Morocco	Ottoman Empire: Regency of Algiers; (Ottoman Empire) Regency of Tunis	Spain (Sovereign Military Order of Malta) Knights of Malta Saadi Sultanate	Victory: Béjaïa under Ottoman rule.; Ottomans capture Tripoli.; Mahdia was abandoned by Spain.; Ottomans temporarily occupy parts of the Balearics.; Ottoman supremacy on Mediterranean sea until Battle of Lepanto.
1551	Ottoman conquest of Tripolitania	Ottoman Empire	(Sovereign Military Order of Malta) Order of Saint John	Victory: Ottomans conquer Tripoli
1551	Invasion of Gozo	Ottoman Empire	(Sovereign Military Order of Malta) Order of Saint John (Sovereign Military Order of Malta) Maltese civilians	Victory: Gozo population decimated and majority of islanders forced into slavery
1551–59	Italian War of 1551–1559	Ottoman Empire Kingdom of France (Old Swiss Confederacy) Swiss mercenaries Republic of Siena; Papal States	Holy Roman Empire: (Spain) Spanish Empire; Duchy of Mantua; Republic of Florence; Duchy of Savoy; Kingdom of England	Inconclusive: Spanish-Imperial victory; Ottoman victory in the Mediterranean; Dragut's numerous victories against Genoese and Habsburgian fleets gives it near dominance in the Mediterranean; France occupies Calais from English; France cedes Corsica to Genoa after Dragut conquered it for the Franco-Ottoman alliance
1552	Hungarian Campaign of 1552	Ottoman Empire	Hungary; Spain; Bohemia; Holy Roman Empire	Inconclusive: Ottomans conquer Temesvár but fail to take Eger
1554/1557–1589	Ottoman conquest of Habesh	Ottoman Empire Medri Bahri Adal Sultanate	Ethiopian Empire	Victory: Establishment of Habesh Eyalet.
1554–1576	Ottoman expeditions to Morocco: Capture of Fez (1554); Capture of Fez (1576)	Ottoman Empire: Regency of Algiers; Kingdom of Kuku Principality of Debdou Wattasid Sultanate (1554) Abd al-Malik Forces (1576)	Saadi Sultanate	Victory: Ottoman Algerian forces conquer Fez and then Marrakesh. Installing vassal rulers on Morocco.
1557	Campaign of Tlemcen (1557)	Ottoman Empire: Regency of Algiers; Kingdom of Beni Abbas	Saadi Sultanate	Victory: Moroccan failure to conquer Algeria.
1558–66	Ottoman–Portuguese conflicts (1558–1566): Siege of Bahrain; Battle of Kamaran Island (1560)	Ottoman Empire: (Ottoman Empire) Ottoman Arabia; Ajuran Sultanate	Portuguese Empire: Portuguese India; Kingdom of Hormuz	Inconclusive due to Suleiman the Magnificent death: Portuguese tactical victory
1560	Battle of Djerba	Ottoman Empire	Republic of Genoa Spanish Empire; Papal States; Duchy of Savoy (Sovereign Military Order of Malta) Order of Saint John	Victory: Dragut ensures Ottoman naval superiority (Note: The sixteenth century saw only three such large battle: Preveza in 1538, Djerba in 1560 and Lepanto in 1571. These battles were spectacular..[...].Nevertheless, these battles were not really decisive; a galley fleet can be built in a few months and the logistical limitations of galleys prohibit the strategic exploitation of victory.)
1565–1898	Spanish conquest of the Philippines	Sultanate of Sulu; Sultanate of Maguindanao; Confederation of sultanates in Lanao Supported by: Sultanate of Ternate; Bruneian empire; Ottoman Empire	Spanish Empire: (Spain) Captaincy General of the Philippines	Inconclusive
1565	Great Siege of Malta	Ottoman Empire; Kingdom of Beni Abbas	(Sovereign Military Order of Malta) Order of Malta; (Sovereign Military Order of Malta) Maltese militia; Spanish Empire; Relief force: Spanish Empire; Republic of Genoa; Duchy of Savoy; (Tuscany) Duchy of Florence; Papal States	Defeat: Christian Victory; Dragut dies in action leading to conflict between remaining Ottoman generals; Myth of Ottoman Invincibility in Europe destroyed
1566	Siege of Szigetvár	Ottoman Empire: Eastern Hungarian Kingdom	Habsburg Empire: Kingdom of Hungary Kingdom of Croatia	Victory: Suleiman the Magnificent dies in his tent before the final assault.; The whole Hungarian-Croatian army (2300–3000) is killed, Miklós IV Zrínyi is killed in the final battle.; Miklós IV Zrínyi ordered a fuse be lit to the powder magazine. After cutting down the last of the defenders the Ottoman Army entered the remains of Szigetvár and fell into the trap. 3,000 Turks perished in the explosion.; 20,000–30,000 Ottomans were killed.; Ottomans captured Szigetvár fortress and it became part of Budin Eyalet

== Transformation (1566–1703) ==
Date	Conflict	Ottomans (and allies)	Opposition	Result
1567–1872	Philippine revolts against Spain	Filipino rebel groups: Muslim resistance; British supporters; Bruneian and Ottoman supporters; (Japan) Japanese and Chinese supporters	Spain: New Spain; Filipino loyalists	Defeat: Most revolts failed
1568–1570	Astrakhan Expedition	Ottoman Empire; Crimean Khanate	Tsardom of Russia	Defeat: Treaty of Constantinople 1570
1570–1572	Russo-Crimean Wars	Crimean Khanate; Ottoman Empire	Tsardom of Russia	Defeat: The Russians defeat the Crimean Tatars at the Battle of Molodi in 1572
1570–1573	Fourth Ottoman–Venetian War	Ottoman Empire	Holy League: Republic of Venice; Spain; Papal States; Kingdom of Naples; Republic of Genoa; Kingdom of Sicily; Grand Duchy of Tuscany; Duchy of Urbino; Duchy of Savoy (Sovereign Military Order of Malta) Knights of Malta	Victory: Cyprus under Ottoman rule
1571	Battle of Lepanto	Ottoman Empire	Holy League: Republic of Venice; (Spain) Spanish Empire (with Naples and Sicily); Republic of Genoa; Papal States; Grand Duchy of Tuscany; Duchy of Savoy; Duchy of Urbino; (Sovereign Military Order of Malta) Order of Saint John	Defeat
1574	Conquest of Tunis	Ottoman Empire	(Spain) Spanish Empire	Victory: Ottomans capture Tunis
1576	Capture of Fez	Ottoman Empire: Beylerbeylik of Algiers	Saadi Sultanate: Abd al-Malik Forces	Victory: Ottoman force conquers Fez and then Marrakesh; Abd al-Malek assumes rule over Morocco as an Ottoman vassal
1578	Castilian War	Brunei; Sulu Sultanate; Maguindanao; Supported by: Ottoman Empire	Spanish Empire: Captaincy General of the Philippines; Pro-Spanish Bruneians	Inconclusive: The Burning and destruction of the Bruneian Mosque of Kota Batu and the Spanish retreating to Manila; Sultan Saiful Rijal 's reconstruction of the Capital of the Sultanate; Brunei ceasing to be an empire at sea; Spanish-Bruneian relations improved
1578	Battle of Alcácer Quibir	Saadi Sultanate; Ottoman Empire	Portuguese Empire	Victory: Death of Abd al-Malik, Abdallah Mohammed and Sebastian of Portugal
1578–1590	Ottoman–Safavid War of 1578	Ottoman Empire; Crimean Khanate	Safavid Empire; Kingdom of Kartli	Victory: Ottomans gain the Safavid provinces of Georgia, the Erivan province, Daghestan, Shirvan, Karabakh, Lorestan, Khuzestan, and most of Azerbaijan; Treaty of Constantinople (1590)
1581	Capture of Muscat (1581)	Ottoman Empire	Portuguese Empire	Victory
1585	Ottoman expedition against the Druze	Ottoman Empire	Druze	Victory
1585–1589	Ottoman–Portuguese conflicts (1585–1589) in Swahili coast	Ottoman Empire Adal Sultanate supported by: Mogadishu; Barawa; Lamu; Pate; Faza; Mombasa; Pemba	Portuguese Empire supported by: Malindi; Zimbas	Defeat: Portuguese control in the South East African coast restored and Mir Ali Bey captured
1593–1606	Long Turkish War	Ottoman Empire: Khanate of Crimea	Holy Roman Empire: Habsburg Monarchy; Saxony; Grand Duchy of Tuscany; Duchy of Ferrara; Duchy of Mantua; Duchy of Savoy; Knights of St. Stephen; Kingdom of Hungary; Kingdom of Croatia; Duchy of Carniola; Principality of Transylvania Wallachia Moldavia France Spain: (Spain) Spanish Netherlands; (Spain) Spanish Italy; Kingdom of Sicily; Kingdom of Naples; Zaporozhian Cossacks Serbian hajduks Papal States	Inconclusive: Peace of Zsitvatorok
1596–1597	Serb uprising of 1596–1597	Ottoman Empire	Serb rebels	Victory: Rebellion suppressed by the Ottoman Empire
1598	First Tarnovo Uprising	Ottoman Empire	Bulgarian Rebels	Victory: Rebellion Suppressed
1599	Battle of Nakhiduri	Ottoman Empire	Kingdom of Kartli	Victory: King Simon, was taken captive.
1602–1612	Ottoman–Safavid War	Ottoman Empire	Safavid Empire; Kingdom of Kartli; Kingdom of Kakheti	Defeat: Treaty of Nasuh Pasha (1612); Safavids regain control over the territories ceded in 1590 to the Ottomans; Azerbaijan, Georgia, Erivan province, Daghestan, Shirvan, Karabakh, Lorestan, and Khuzestan
1616–1618	Ottoman–Safavid War	Ottoman Empire	Safavid Empire	Defeat: Treaty of Serav (1618); The terms of the treaty was similar to those of treaty of Nasuh Pasha with several minor rectifications of the border line Also, the annual tribute of the Persian side was reduced from 200 loads to 100 loads.
1609	Battle of Tashiskari	Ottoman Empire	Kingdom of Kartli	Defeat: The Georgians, led by Giorgi Saakadze won a victory over the Ottoman Turks.
1620–1621	Polish–Ottoman War	Ottoman Empire Crimean Khanate Principality of Wallachia	Polish–Lithuanian Commonwealth Principality of Moldavia	Inconclusive: Beneficial treaty in favor of the Ottoman Empire, Poland withdraws behind the Dniester, the Ottomans renew their suzerainty over the Danubian principalities; Treaty of Khotyn
1623	Battle of Anjar	Ottoman Empire	Mount Lebanon Emirate; Grand Duchy of Tuscany	Defeat: Fakhreddine captures Mustafa Pasha; Beylerbey confirms the Ma'ns' governorships
1623–1639	Ottoman–Safavid War	Ottoman Empire	Safavid Empire	Victory: Permanent partition of the Caucasus; Western Georgia and Western Armenia goes to the Ottomans, while Eastern Armenia, Dagestan, Eastern and Southern Georgia, and Azerbaijan remain under Persian rule. Ottomans decisively gain control over Mesopotamia
1624–1632	Abaza Revolts	Ottoman Empire	Abaza Mehmed Pasha forces	Victory: Revolts suppressed
1627	Turkish Abductions	Ottoman Empire	Iceland	Victory: Abduction of 400-800 Icelanders
1633–1634	Polish–Ottoman War	Ottoman Empire Crimean Khanate Principality of Wallachia Principality of Moldavia	Polish–Lithuanian Commonwealth	Inconclusive
1645–1669	War of Candia	Ottoman Empire	Republic of Venice (Sovereign Military Order of Malta) Order of Saint John; Papal States; France; Maniots	Victory: Crete conquered by the Ottoman Empire Venetian gains in Dalmatia
1654–1679	Sirko's Campaigns	Ottoman Empire Crimean Khanate Nogai Horde	Zaporozhian Cossacks Don Cossacks Kalmyk Khanate	Defeat: Deterrence of Ottoman campaigns in Ukraine until 18th century; Failure to destroy Zaporozhian Sich
1658–1667	Druze power struggle	Ottoman Empire	Ma'ani Druze rebels	Victory: Maʿnīs lost control of Safad
1663–1664	Austro-Turkish War (1663–1664)	Ottoman Empire	League of the Rhine: Kingdom of France; Holy Roman Empire: Electorate of Saxony; Brandenburg-Prussia; Electorate of Bavaria; Baden-Baden; Swabia; Piedmont-Savoy; Kingdom of Hungary; Kingdom of Croatia; Polish–Lithuanian Commonwealth	Victory: Peace of Vasvár; The Ottomans retain Oradea in Transylvania and gain Nové Zámky from the Kingdom of Hungary; Construction of a Habsburg fort along the Waag river, and granted a twenty-year truce.
1672–1676	Polish–Ottoman War	Ottoman Empire Crimean Khanate Principality of Moldavia	Polish–Lithuanian Commonwealth Principality of Wallachia (1673)	Victory: Treaty of Buchach: Ottoman Empire gains Podolia and parts of Central Ukraine. Polish-Lithuanian Commonwealth is turned into a fief of the Ottoman Empire for 4 years; Treaty of Żurawno: Polish-Lithuanian Commonwealth regains Bila Tserkva and Pavoloch
1676–1681	Russo-Turkish War	Ottoman Empire; Crimean Khanate	Tsardom of Russia	Inconclusive: The border between Russia and the Ottoman Empire was to constitute the river Dnipro, with Russia being awarded Kiev together with the towns of Stajki, Trypillia, Vasylkiv, Didowszczyzna, Radomyshl, located on the right "Ottoman" bank of the river, the Ottoman Empire recognized the sovereignty of Russia over Left-bank Ukraine.; Treaty of Bakhchisarai
1683–1699	Great Turkish War	Ottoman Empire Vassal states: Crimean Khanate; Shamkhalate of Tarki; Upper Hungary (1683–5); Moldavia; Wallachia; Transylvania	Holy Roman Empire: Habsburg monarchy; (Electorate of Bavaria) Bavaria; Franconia; Saxony; Swabia; Duchy of Styria; Royal Hungary; Kingdom of Croatia; Duchy of Mantua; Polish–Lithuanian Commonwealth; Tsardom of Russia: Cossack Hetmanate; Republic of Venice; Spanish Empire; Montenegro; Albanian rebels Serbian rebels Greek rebels Bulgarian rebels Romanian rebels Croatian rebels	Defeat: Treaty of Karlowitz; Ottoman decline in Europe; The Habsburg monarchy wins lands in Hungary, the Principality of Transylvania and the Balkans.; Poland-Lithuania captures Podolia.; Russia captures the port of Azov.; Venice captures Morea and inner Dalmatia.; Montenegro gains de facto independence.
1686	Second Tarnovo Uprising	Ottoman Empire	Bulgarian Rebels	Victory: Rebellion Suppressed
1688	Chiprovtsi Uprising	Ottoman Empire	Rebels	Victory: Rebellion Suppressed
1689	Karposh's Rebellion	Ottoman Empire	Bulgarian Rebels	Victory: Rebellion Suppressed; Ottomans suppressed rebellions in Kratovo, Kriva Palanka, Kumanovo and Skopje
1700–1721	Great Northern War: Russo-Turkish War; Skirmish at Bender	Swedish Empire; Ottoman Empire (1710–14); Crimean Khanate (1710–14)	Tsardom of Russia; Cossack Hetmanate; Moldavia (1711)	Inconclusive for Ottomans: Sweden was defeated; Ottoman victory in Pruth River; The Tsardom of Russia establishes itself as a new power in Europe; Treaty of the Pruth: Azov area is ceded back to the Ottoman Empire. Russia demolishes strategic castles such as Taganrog. Charles XII of Sweden gets safe passage from Turkey to Sweden in 1711.

== Old Regime (1703–1789) ==
Date	Conflict	Ottomans (and allies)	Opposition	Result
1710–1711	Russo-Turkish War	Ottoman Empire	Tsardom of Russia	Victory: Russians would not interfere in Polish internal affairs.; Russians will not have a permanent ambassador in Istanbul.; They would allow Swedish King return to his country freely.; Azov returns to Ottoman territory. Taganrog and other Russian fortresses are destroyed.; Treaty of Pruth
1713	Skirmish at Bender	Ottoman Empire	Swedish Empire	Victory: The Swedish King and the soldiers were captured by the Turks and taken prisoner.
1714–1718	Ottoman–Venetian War	Ottoman Empire	Republic of Venice (Habsburg monarchy) Austria (from 1716); Portugal; Order of Malta; Papal States; Kingdom of Spain; Himariotes	Victory: Morea ceded back to Ottoman Empire
1715	Battle of Van	Ottoman Empire	Yazidis	Defeat
1716–1718	Austro-Turkish War	Ottoman Empire	Habsburg Monarchy	Defeat: The Banat, Serbia, Oltenia and portions of northern Bosnia were ceded to the Habsburgs; Treaty of Passarowitz
1722–1730	Syunik rebellion	Ottoman Empire	Armenian Rebels	Victory: Syunik is occupied by the Ottomans.
1726–1727	Ottoman–Hotaki War	Ottoman Empire	Hotaki dynasty	Both sides make gains: Ottoman political gains, annexing territories in Zanjan, Soltaniyeh, and Abhar.; Hotak military victory, Ottoman recognition of Hotaks as Shah of Iran; Treaty of Hamedan
1730–1735	Ottoman–Safavid War	Ottoman Empire	Safavid Empire	Defeat: Persian (Nader) reconquest of the entire Caucasus.; Ottoman Empire recognized Nader as the new shah of Persia; Ottoman Empire conceded Caucasus to Persia; The Ottomans also agreed to allow the Iranian hajis (pilgrims) to Mecca (then under Ottoman control); Treaty of Constantinople
1730	Patrona Halil	Ottoman Empire	Patrona Halil	Tulip Period is ended: Grand Vizier Nevşehirli Damat İbrahim Pasha was executed.; Ahmed III had to abdicate the throne. Mahmud I ascended the throne.
1732	Spanish reconquest of Oran	Regency of Algiers; Ottoman Empire	Kingdom of Spain	Defeat: Spanish reconquest of Oran; Spanish reconquest of Mers el-Kebir
1735–1739	Russo-Turkish War	Ottoman Empire	Russian Empire; Cossack Hetmanate	Inconclusive: Azov Castle was destroyed, its territory became the border between the Ottoman Empire and Russia.; Russians will withdraw from Crimea.; Ottoman Empire cedes Azov to Russia.; Treaty of Niš
1737–1739	Austro-Turkish War	Ottoman Empire	(Holy Roman Empire) Habsburg monarchy	Victory: Habsburg monarchy cedes Kingdom of Serbia, Oltenia, southern Banat to Ottoman Empire; Treaty of Belgrade
1743–1746	Ottoman–Afsharid War	Ottoman Empire	Afsharid dynasty	Inconclusive: The boundary line between the two countries was the same boundary line drawn roughly a century earlier according to the Treaty of Zuhab of 1639 (i.e., which included roughly the demarcation of the modern Turkey-Iran and Iraq-Iran border lines).; Treaty of Kerden, Status Quo Ante Bellum
1757	Battle of Khresili	Ottoman Empire	Kingdom of Imereti: Principality of Mingrelia; Principality of Guria; Principality of Abkhazia (Samurzakano)	Defeat: After the battle of Khresili, in 1758–1766, the Ottomans attacked Imereti many times, but they could not subjugate Solomon I. Ottomans were eventually forced to sign a treaty with the kingdom of Imereti
1768–1774	Russo-Turkish War	Ottoman Empire (Autonomous Republic of Crimea) Crimea	Russia	Defeat: Ottoman Empire cedes Kerch, Enikale and part of Yedisan to Russia. Crimean Khanate becomes a Russian client state.; Treaty of Küçük Kaynarca
1769–1772	Danish–Algerian War	Deylik of Algiers; Ottoman Empire	Denmark–Norway	Victory
1770	Orlov Revolt	Ottoman Empire	Greeks; Supported by: (Russian Empire) Russia	Victory: Ottoman military victory; Treaty of Küçük Kaynarca
1770	Invasion of Mani (1770)	Ottoman Empire	Mani	Defeat: Ottoman retreat
1775–1776	Ottoman–Zand War	Ottoman Empire	Zand Iran	Defeat: Basra captured by the Zands; Change of territories for the benefit of the Safavids for 4 years and restoration of the previous borders after the peace.
1785–1789	First Scutari-Ottoman War	Ottoman Empire: Bosnia Eyalet; Rumelia Eyalet; Pashalik of Yanina; Pashalik of Berat; Toptani family; Ulcinj rebels	Pashalik of Scutari	Inconclusive
1787–1791	Austro-Turkish War	Ottoman Empire	(Holy Roman Empire) Habsburg monarchy	Inconclusive: Orșova and Croatian borderlands ceded to the Habsburg monarchy; Treaty of Sistova; After this treaty, the two empires never fought each other until their collapse after WWI
1787–1792	Russo-Turkish War	Ottoman Empire	Russia	Defeat: Russian annexation of Ottoman Sanjak of Özi Yedisan or Ochacov Oblast Local Black Sea Cossack Host deported to Kuban as a "reward"; Treaty of Jassy

== Decline and modernization (1789–1908) ==
Date	Conflict	Ottomans (and allies)	Opposition	Result
1791–1795	Second Scutari-Ottoman War	Ottoman Empire; Pashalik of Yanina; Pashalik of Berat; Bushati family	Pashalik of Scutari; Pashalik of Vidin	Defeat
1798	Mediterranean campaign of 1798: War of the Second Coalition	Great Britain; After June 1798: Portugal; Russia; Ottoman Empire; Kingdom of Naples (Sovereign Military Order of Malta) Hospitaller Malta	France; Spain	Coalition victory
1798–1801	French invasion of Egypt and Syria: War of the Second Coalition	Ottoman Empire: Egypt; Mamluks; Regency of Algiers; Great Britain (1798–1800); United Kingdom (1801); Irregular and auxiliary forces: Nablus tribesmen; Bedouin tribesmen (1798–1799, 1801); Albanian bashi-bazouks	French Republic	Anglo-Ottoman victory
1806–1812	Russo-Turkish War: Napoleonic Wars	Ottoman Empire: Budjak Horde (1806–1807)	Russian Empire Principality of Mingrelia; Principality of Guria; Principality of Abkhazia; Moldavia; Wallachia; Revolutionary Serbia; Prince-Bishopric of Montenegro	Defeat: See § Aftermath; Treaty of Bucharest; Russia annexes the eastern half of Moldavia, which became known as Bessarabia
1807–1809	Anglo-Turkish War: Napoleonic Wars	Ottoman Empire; Egypt Eyalet; Supported by: (First French Empire) French Empire	(United Kingdom of Great Britain and Ireland) United Kingdom; Supported by: Russian Empire	Treaty of the Dardanelles
1804–1813	First Serbian Uprising	Dahije (1804); From 1805: Ottoman Empire: (Bosnia Eyalet) Ayans; Pashalik of Scutari; Pashalik of Yanina; From 1813: Wallachia; Great Banship of Craiova	Revolutionary Serbia; Supported by: Russian Empire (1807–1812); Wallachia (1804)	Ottoman victory (see Aftermath section): Abolishment of the Serbian rebel government
1811–1818	Ottoman-Saudi War	Ottoman Empire: Egypt Eyalet	Diriyah	Victory: End of the First Saudi State
1815–1817	Second Serbian Uprising	Ottoman Empire	(Principality of Serbia) Serbian rebels	Defeat: Establishment of the autonomous Principality of Serbia; Ottoman Empire loses control over the Sanjak of Smederevo
1820–1824	Turco-Egyptian conquest of Sudan	Ottoman Empire: Egypt	Sennar Sultanate; Shayqih Kingdom; Sultanate of Darfur	Ottoman-Egyptian military victory: Conquest of the region and start of Turco-Egyptian Sudan rule.
1821	Wallachian Revolution of 1821	Ottoman Empire: Danubian Sich; Arnauts; Austrian Empire: (Ottoman Empire) Moldavian insurgents	Wallachia (revolutionary): (Wallachia) Wallachian Divan (conservative); Arnauts	Ottoman military victory, Wallachian political victory: End of the Phanariote Era
1821–1832	Greek War of Independence	Ottoman Empire: Egypt; Algeria; Tripolitania; Tunis	Filiki Eteria; Greek revolutionaries After 1822: Hellenic Republic Supported by: Romanian Revolutionaries (1821) (Greece) Philhellenes; United Kingdom (after 1826); Russian Empire (after 1826); Kingdom of France (after 1826); Serb and Montenegrin volunteers	Defeat: First Hellenic Republic established and recognized
1821–1823	Ottoman–Iranian War of 1821	Ottoman Empire	Qajar Iran	Defeat: Recognition of the border established by the Treaty of Zuhab (1639); Treaty of Erzurum
1828–1829	Russo-Turkish War	Ottoman Empire	Russia	Defeat: In recognition of the Treaty of London, the independence of Greece, or autonomy under Ottoman suzerainty, was accepted.; The Ottoman Empire had nominal suzerainty over the Danube states of Moldavia and Wallachia; for all practical purposes, they were independent.; Russia took control of the towns of Anape and Poti in Caucasus.; The Russian traders in Turkey were placed under the legal jurisdiction of the Russian ambassador.; Treaty of Adrianople
1829–1831	Third Scutari-Ottoman War	Ottoman Empire: Pashalik of İpek (from 1831); Pashalik of Priştine (from 1831); Pashalik of Prizren (from 1831); Pashalik of Üsküp (from 1831); Pashalik of Vranje (from 1831); Pashalik of Leskovac (from 1831)	Pashalik of Scutari: Pashalik of Priştine (until 1831); Pashalik of Prizren (until 1831); Pashalik of Üsküp (until 1831); Pashalik of Vranje (until 1831); Pashalik of Leskovac (until 1831); Bajrak of Mirdita; Southern Albanian rebels (annihilated in 1830)	Victory
1830–1903	French conquest of Algeria	Ottoman Empire: Regency of Algiers; Emirate of Abdelkader; Kingdom of Ait Abbas; Kel Ahaggar	France	Defeat: Pacification of Algeria
1831–1832	Bosnian Uprising of 1831–1832	Ottoman Empire	(Bosnia Eyalet) Bosnian Landlords	Victory: Rebellion suppressed by the Ottoman Empire; Herzegovina Eyalet was seceded from Bosnia Eyalet; Ayan system was abolished
1831–1833	Egyptian–Ottoman War	Ottoman Empire	Egypt Eyalet	Defeat: Egypt gained the Aleppo Vilayet and the Syria Vilayet.; Convention of Kütahya; Egypt becomes an autonomous vassal of the Ottoman Empire; Unresolved tensions result in a second war six years later
1832–1848	Ottoman–Ethiopian border conflicts	Ottoman Empire: Egypt	Ethiopian Empire	Inconclusive: Ethiopia retains territorial integrity and independence; Ottoman-Egyptians expand south into the Great Lakes region
1833	Albanian Revolt of 1833 in Kolonjë	Ottoman Empire	Tosk Rebels	Defeat: Revolts begin in protest to new Ottoman reforms in Albania; Following this, many revolts follow in the coming decades
1833	Albanian Revolt of 1833 in Shkodër	Ottoman Empire	Shkodran Rebels; Malsor Rebels	Defeat: Shkodër is captured by the Rebels.; Ottomans unsuccessfully besiege Shkodër for three months.; The Ottomans give in to Albanian demands.; Violations of agreements by the Ottomans in 1835 starts another revolt
1833	Albanian Revolt of 1833 in Southern Albania	Ottoman Empire	Tosk Rebels; Lab Rebels	Defeat: Large areas of Southern Albania are captured by the Rebels, including the Castle of Berat; The Ottomans give in to Albanian demands
1834	Albanian Revolt of 1834	Ottoman Empire	Tosk Rebels; Lab Rebels	Defeat: Berat is captured by the Rebels after two months of siege; The Ottomans give in to Albanian demands in January 1835 following the fall of Berat; Agreements of peace are violated by the Ottomans later in 1835, starting another revolt
1835	Albanian Revolt of 1835 in South Albania	Ottoman Empire	Tosk Rebels; Lab Rebels; Çam Rebels	Victory: Rebels march against Ioannina; Ottoman reinforcements force the Rebels to retreat
1835	Albanian Revolt of 1835 in North Albania	Ottoman Empire	Shkodran Rebels; Reinforcements: Kosovar Rebels Volunteers: Malsor Volunteers; Gheg Volunteers; Mirdita Tribesmen; Mati Tribesmen; Dibran Volunteers	Defeat: Large areas of North Albania rise up in revolt, with Shkodër besieged and the rebels defeat the Ottomans in battle; Albanian reinforcements to the Shkodrans are sent from Postribe, Kosovo, Malësia, Ulqin (now Ulcinj), Podgorica, Mirditë, Mat and Dibra; Ottoman forces are defeated in battle by the insurgents in July; Ottomans trick many rebels into withdrawing through a false ceasefire, and successfully capture Lezhë in order to relieve Shkodër; Ottomans carry out Albanian demands in order to calm the situation
1836	Albanian Revolt of 1836 in South Albania	Ottoman Empire	Tosk Rebels; Lab Rebels	Inconclusive
1836	Expedition to Najd (1836)	Ottoman Empire: Egypt	Emirate of Najd	Victory: Khalid bin Saud Al Saud appointed as ruler of Najd on behalf of the Ottoman Empire; Mehmet Ali occupies Najd, al-Hasa and Qatif and gains the submission of Bahrain, Qatar and Trucial Oman
1837	Albanian Revolt of 1837 in Mat	Ottoman Empire	Mati Tribesmen	Inconclusive
1837	Albanian Revolt of 1837 in Myzeqe	Ottoman Empire	Myzeq Rebels; Tosk Rebels	Victory: Rebel victory at the Battle of Berat.; Rebel defeat at the Battle of Frakulla.; Local leaders captured and rebellion in Myzeqe is suppressed
1837	Albanian Revolt of 1837 in North Albania	Ottoman Empire	Kosovar Rebels; Gheg Rebels	Victory: Gjakova, Pejë, Plava, Gucia are captured by the rebels but then retaken by the Ottomans
1837	Albanian Revolt of 1837 in Dibër	Ottoman Empire	Dibran Rebels	Defeat: Upper and Lower Dibër are captured by the rebels; Ottomans meet rebel demands
1839	Albanian Revolt of 1839 in South Albania	Ottoman Empire	Tosk Rebels; Lab Rebels	Defeat: Berat is besieged and the rebellion spreads to the Sanjak of Vlora; Ottomans meet Albanian demands
1839	Albanian Revolt of 1839 in Prizren	Ottoman Empire	Kosovar Rebels	Defeat: Prizren is captured by rebels in protest of new reforms; Ottomans drop reforms and the revolt ends
1839–1841	Egyptian–Ottoman War	Ottoman Empire; British Empire; Austrian Empire; Russia; Prussia	Egypt Eyalet; France; Spain	Victory: Egypt renounced its claim to Syria; Convention of London enforced by allied powers Ottoman failure to take Syria by military force; Recognition of Muhammad Ali and his descendants as legitimate rulers of Egypt
1843–1844	Uprising of Dervish Cara	Ottoman Empire	Dibran Rebels	Victory: Albanians under Dervish Cara capture large areas in northern Albania, Kosovo and Macedonia.; Ottomans promise Albanian autonomy but then launch an invasion, retaking areas and suppressing the rebellion, aided by Catholic Mirdita tribesmen under Bibë Dodë
1847	Albanian revolt of 1847	Ottoman Empire	Tosk Rebels; Lab Rebels; Çam Rebels	Victory: Rebels defeat the Ottomans in four separate battles and besiege the castles of Berat and Gjirokastër. Large areas of Southern Albania are captured.; Ottomans organise a false amnesty, in which many of the rebel leaders are captured.; Ottomans lift the sieges and areas are retaken
1848	Wallachian Revolution of 1848	Wallachia; Ottoman Empire; Russian Empire	Revolutionaries: Liberals; Nationalists	Counterrevolutionary victory: Gheorghe Bibescu overthrown; Provisional government formed; Conservative coup d'état; Wallachia invaded by the Russian and Ottoman Empires; Revolution suppressed; Barbu Dimitrie Știrbei brought to the throne
1852–1853	Montenegrin–Ottoman War (1852–53)	Ottoman Empire	Montenegro	Defeat: Without significant territorial changes
1852–1862	Herzegovina uprising (1852–1862)	Ottoman Empire	Rebels	Victory
1853–1856	Crimean War	Ottoman Empire; France: Egypt; Tunis; Britain (Note: From 1854) (Kingdom of Sardinia) Sardinia (Note: From 1855); Supported by: Austrian Empire Caucasus Imamate (Note: Until 1855); Circassia; Abkhazia	Russian Empire: Mingrelia; Greece (Note: Until 1854)	Victory: Treaty of Paris
1854	Macedonian Revolution of 1854	Ottoman Empire Supported By: France; Britain	Greek Revolutionaries Supported By: (Kingdom of Greece) Greece	Victory
1858	Battle of Grahovac	Ottoman Empire	Montenegro	Defeat
1861–1862	Montenegrin–Ottoman War (1861–62)	Ottoman Empire	Montenegro	Victory: Convention of Scutari
1862	First Zeitun Resistance	Ottoman Empire	Armenian fedayees	Defeat: Ottoman troops pillage Alabaş; Ottoman troops withdraw from the region
1866–1869	Cretan Revolt	Ottoman Empire Egypt	Greek Revolutionaries; Supported by: Kingdom of Greece	Victory: Suppression of the revolt
1874–1876	Egyptian–Ethiopian War	Ottoman Empire Egypt	Ethiopian Empire	Defeat: Hewett Treaty
1875	Herzegovina uprising (1875–1877)	Ottoman Empire	Serb rebels: Aided by: Montenegro; Serbia	Victory: Revolt suppressed
1876	April Uprising	Ottoman Empire	Bulgarian revolutionaries	Victory: Uprising suppressed; Suppression led to the Constantinople Conference, then to the Russo-Turkish War (1877–1878) and ultimately to the Liberation of Bulgaria
1876–1878	Montenegrin–Ottoman War (1876–78)	Ottoman Empire	Montenegro	Defeat: Montenegro gains the towns of Nikšić, Kolašin, Spuž, Podgorica, Žabljak and Bar.; Montenegro's territory increases from 4,405 km^{2} to 9,475 km^{2}; De jure independence of Montenegro; Treaty of San Stefano; Treaty of Berlin
1876–1877	First Serbian–Ottoman War	Ottoman Empire: Egypt	Serbia: Montenegro; (Russia) Russian Volunteers; Bulgarian Volunteers	Defeat: British public opinion turns against the Ottomans; Russian-mediated truce
1877–1878	Russo-Turkish War	Ottoman Empire	Russia; Romania Bulgarian volunteers Serbia; Montenegro	Defeat: Treaty of San Stefano; Treaty of Berlin; Treaty of Constantinople; Reestablishment of the Bulgarian state; De jure independence of Romania, Serbia and Montenegro from Turkey; The annexation of Kars and Batum into Russia; Kars and Batum Oblasts become part of the Russian Empire, Britain occupies Cyprus, Austria-Hungary occupies Bosnia; Russian annexation of Southern Bessarabia from Romania, Romanian annexation of Northern Dobruja; Official recognition of de facto and de jure independence of the Balkan states.
1877–1878	Second Serbian–Ottoman War	Ottoman Empire	Serbia; Russia	Defeat: De jure independence of Serbia; Tens of thousands of Turkish, Jewish and Albanian civilians expelled
1877-1878	Osman Pasha Bedir Khan Revolt	Ottoman Empire	Kurdish forces; (Kurdistan Region) Bedirkhan family; Kurdish tribes; Reşkotan; Motkan	Victory: Revolt suppressed
1878	Austro-Hungarian occupation of Bosnia and Herzegovina	Ottoman Empire: Bosnia	Austria-Hungary	Defeat: Incorporation of Bosnia and Herzegovina into Austria-Hungary
1878	Al–Ahsa Uprising	Ottoman Empire	Sultanate of Nejd Second Saudi state	Victory: Revolt suppressed
1878-1879	Kresna–Razlog uprising	Ottoman Empire	Unity Committee	Victory
1879-1882	Urabi revolt	Ottoman Empire: Egypt; Supported By: France; Britain	Ahmed Urabi Egyptian rebel forces	Defeat
1880	Battle of Ulcinj (1880)	Ottoman Empire	Albanian irregulars: League of Prizren	Victory: The Albanians clashed with the Ottomans at the Kodra e Kuqe, near the village of Kllezna. The Albanians defeated the first wave of Ottoman forces but when reinforcements arrived the Albanians were temporarily defeated and returned. The commander Isuf Sokoli was wounded and died later that day. In 1880, on 23 November, the Ottomans continued to march in the city and surrendered the city to the Montenegrin army. The city had officially been handed over to Montenegro and after a 30-month-long negotiation process, with European powers involved, the battle ended.
1881	French conquest of Tunisia	Ottoman Empire: Ottoman Tunisia	France	Defeat: Tunisia becomes a French protectorate
1882	Anglo-Egyptian War: Bombardment of Alexandria	Ottoman Empire Egypt	Britain: British Raj	Defeat: British occupation of Egypt; British intervention in Sudan
1893–1908	Macedonian Struggle	Ottoman Empire Greek Kingdom Serbian Kingdom Romanian Kingdom	Bulgarian Principality	Inconclusive: Bulgaria, Serbia, Greece, Romania and the Ottoman Empire fight a four way war; War end inconclusively after Young Turk Revolution; Bulgaria gains full independence in 1908
1893	Ottoman–Qatari War	Ottoman Empire	Qatar	Defeat: Relinquishment of Qatari captives; Eventual independence of Qatar from the Ottoman Empire
1895–1896	Zeitun rebellion (1895–96)	Ottoman Empire	Hunchak Party	Defeat
1897	Greco-Turkish War of 1897	Ottoman Empire	(Kingdom of Greece) Greece: (Kingdom of Italy) Italian volunteers; (Armenia) Armenian volunteers	Victory: Small parts of Thessaly ceded to the Ottoman Empire
1897–1898	Cretan Revolt (1897–1898)	Ottoman Empire	Cretan revolutionaries Kingdom of Greece; British Empire; France (Kingdom of Italy) Italy; Russian Empire; Austria-Hungary (until April 12, 1898); German Empire (until March 16, 1898)	Defeat: Establishment of the Cretan State; Withdraw of Ottoman forces from Crete
1903	Ilinden–Preobrazhenie Uprising	Ottoman Empire	IMARO; SMAC; Kruševo Republic; Strandzha Commune	Victory: Suppression of the uprising; Direct involvement of Russian and the Austro-Hungarian Empires to resolve the Macedonian issue and implementation of the Mürzsteg reforms; Ottoman reprisals against Christian civilians; 30,000 refugees flee to Tsardom of Bulgaria.
1904	Sasun Uprising	Ottoman Empire	Armenian fedayi	Victory
1905	Shoubak revolts	Ottoman Empire	Inhabitants of Shoubak	Victory

== Dissolution (1908–1922) ==
Date	Conflict	Ottomans (and allies)	Opposition	Result
1908	Young Turk Revolution	(Ottoman Empire) Ottoman Imperial Government	CUP	Young Turks victory: Second Constitutional Era begins; Repromulgation of the Constitution; Reinstatement of the Parliament; General elections are called; Bulgaria declares independence; Bosnian Crisis begins
1910	Albanian Revolt of 1910	Ottoman Empire	Albanian rebels	Ottoman victory: Rebellion suppressed
1911	Albanian Revolt of 1911	Ottoman Empire	Albanian tribes Support: Kingdom of Montenegro	Albanian victory
1911–1912	Italo-Turkish War	Ottoman Empire; Senussi Order	Italy; Emirate of Asir	Italian victory: Italy gains Tripolitania, Cyrenaica and the Dodecanese Islands
1912	Albanian Revolt of 1912	Ottoman Empire	Albanian rebels	Albanian victory; De-jure establishment of the Albanian Vilayet
1912–1913	First Balkan War	Ottoman Empire	Balkan League: Bulgaria; Greece; Serbia; Montenegro	Balkan League victory: Treaty of London; Treaty of Athens
1913	Second Balkan War	Serbia; Romania; Greece; Montenegro; Ottoman Empire	Bulgaria	Serbian, Romanian, Greek, Montenegrin and Ottoman victory: Treaty of Bucharest; Treaty of Constantinople; Bulgaria ceded; East Thrace to the Ottoman Empire; Southern Dobruja to Romania; Most of Vardar Macedonia to Serbia; Parts of Western Thrace to Greece
1914–1918	World War I: Middle Eastern theatre; Eastern theatre; Balkans theatre; African theatre	Central Powers: German Empire; Austria-Hungary; Ottoman Empire; Bulgaria (from 1915); and others ...	Allied Powers: France; United Kingdom; and Empire: Australia; Canada; Ceylon; Egypt; Newfoundland; New Zealand; India; South Africa; Russia (until 1917) (Note: The Russian Empire during 1914–1917, the Russian Republic during 1917. The Bolshevik government signed a separate peace with the Central Powers shortly after their armed seizure of power, resulting in a Central Powers victory on the Eastern Front of the war, and the Russian Soviet Federative Socialist Republic's defeat. However, this peace treaty was nullified by an Allied Powers victory on the Western Front, and the end of the war.); Italy (from 1915); United States (from 1917); Japan; and others ...	Allied Powers victory (see Aftermath of World War I): Partition of the Ottoman Empire, dissolution of Austria-Hungary, transfer of German colonies and territories to other countries; Formation of new countries in Europe and the Middle East, such as Poland, Yugoslavia, Weimar Germany, Soviet Russia and Soviet Union, Lithuania, Estonia, Latvia, Austria, Hungary, Czechoslovakia, Turkey, Hejaz, and Yemen
1917–1922	Russian Civil War: German Caucasus expedition; Armenian–Azerbaijani War; Battle of Baku	Central Powers: Germany; Austria-Hungary; Ottoman Empire	Bolsheviks: (Russian Soviet Federative Socialist Republic) Russian SFSR; (Byelorussian Soviet Socialist Republic) Byelorussian SSR; (Ukrainian Soviet Socialist Republic) Ukrainian SSR; (Transcaucasian Socialist Federative Soviet Republic) Transcaucasian SFSR; Regional forces; White movement: (Russia) Russian State; South Russia; Separatists: Poland; Finland; Ukraine; Belarus; Estonia; Latvia; Lithuania; (Georgia (country)) Georgia; Armenia; Azerbaijan; Northern Caucasus; Basmachi; Anti-Bolshevik left: Left SRs; Green Army; Makhnovshchina; Right SRs and Mensheviks; Allied Powers: Japan; United Kingdom; United States; France; Czechoslovakia	Bolshevik victory (see § Aftermath): Establishment of the Soviet Union
1918–1920	Armenian–Azerbaijani War	(Azerbaijan Democratic Republic) Azerbaijan; Ottoman Empire; Republic of Aras (1918–1919)	(First Republic of Armenia) Armenia: Russian SFSR; (Azerbaijan Soviet Socialist Republic) Azerbaijani communists; (Armenian Soviet Socialist Republic) Armenian communists; (Ottoman Empire) Turkish revolutionaries	Inconclusive: Soviet invasion of Armenia and Azerbaijan, and subsequent victory; Sovietization of Armenia and Azerbaijan; Disputes over Karabakh and Nakhchivan settled in favor of Soviet Azerbaijan; Most of Zangezur gained by Soviet Armenia
1918–1923	Occupation of Constantinople	Ottoman Empire	United Kingdom: (British Raj) British India; France: French West Africa; Italy; Greece; United States; Japan Turkish National Movement	Military occupation by the United Kingdom, France, Italy, Japan and Greece: Ottoman Parliament and Empire dismantled; Treaty of Sèvres; Turkish capture of Constantinople; Chanak Crisis; Armistice of Mudanya; Treaty of Lausanne; Recognition of Turkey with Treaty of Lausanne
1919–1923	Turkish War of Independence	Allied powers: Greece France (until 1921)^{[c]}: French West Africa; Armenian Legion; Algeria; Morocco; Tunisia; United Kingdom^{[d]}: India; Armenia (in 1920) Istanbul Government^{[e]} (in 1920): Other pro-Istanbul rebels; Georgia (in 1921) Separatists: Pontic Greek rebels; Kurdish rebels; Assyrian rebels; Green Army (1920–1921)	Turkish Nationalists: Ankara Government (1919–1920; 1920–1923) Also: Azerbaijan (1918–1920); Aras Republic (1918–1919); Iğdır National Republic (1918–1920); Provisional Kars Government (1918–1919); Green Army (1919–1920); Oltu Council Government (1919–1920); Kurdistan (1919; 1921–1923)	Turkish victory: Establishment of the Republic of Turkey

== See also ==
- List of wars involving Turkey
- List of battles involving the Ottoman Empire
- Sick man of Europe
- Eastern Question

== Sources ==
- Arnold, James R. (1995). Napoleon Conquers Austria: The 1809 Campaign for Vienna. Westport, Connecticut: Greenwood Publishing Group. ISBN 978-0-275-94694-4.
- Bartusis, Mark C. (1997), The Late Byzantine Army: Arms and Society 1204–1453, University of Pennsylvania Press, ISBN 978-0-8122-1620-2
- Baştav, Şerif (1989), Bizans İmparatorluğu Tarihi: Son Devir (1261-1461), Ankara: Türk Kültürünü Araştırma Enstitüsü Yayınları, ISBN 975-456-024-2
- Bullock, David (2008). The Russian Civil War 1918–22. Oxford: Osprey. ISBN 978-1-8460-3271-4.
- Ćirković, Sima (2004). The Serbs. Malden: Blackwell Publishing. ISBN 9781405142915.
- Dupuy, R. Ernest; Dupuy, Trevor N. (1993), The Harper Encyclopedia of Military History: From 3500 B.C. to the Present, New York: HarperCollins Publishers, ISBN 0-06-270056-1
- Emmert, Thomas Allan (1990), Serbian Golgotha: Kosovo, 1389, East European Monographs, ISBN 978-0-88033-175-3
- Esdaile, Charles (2009). Napoleon's Wars: An International History, 1803–1815. Penguin Books. ISBN 978-0-14-311628-8.
- Fine, John V. A. (1994) [1987]. The Late Medieval Balkans: A Critical Survey from the Late Twelfth Century to the Ottoman Conquest. Ann Arbor, Michigan: University of Michigan Press. ISBN 978-0-472-10079-8.
- Gingeras, Ryan (2022). The Last Days of the Ottoman Empire. Dublin: Random House. ISBN 978-0-241-44432-0.
- Hattendorf, John; King, Ernest (5 November 2013), Naval Strategy and Power in the Mediterranean: Past, Present and Future, Routledge, ISBN 978-1-136-71317-0
- Hochedlinger, Michael (2015). "The War of the Austrian Succession 1740-1748". Austria's Wars of Emergence: War, State and Society in the Habsburg Monarchy 1683–1797. Taylor & Francis. ISBN 9781317887935.
- İnalcık, Halil (1960). "Bāyazīd". In Gibb, H. A. R.; Kramers, J. H.; Lévi-Provençal, E.; Schacht, J.; Lewis, B. & Pellat, Ch. (eds.). The Encyclopaedia of Islam, Second Edition. Volume I: A–B. Leiden: E. J. Brill. pp. 1117–1119. OCLC 495469456.
- Kármán, Gábor; Kunčevic, Lovro, eds. (2013), The European Tributary States of the Ottoman Empire in the Sixteenth and Seventeenth Centuries, Leiden: Brill, ISBN 9789004246065
- Kohn, George Childs (1999). Dictionary of Wars (Revised ed.). New York: Facts On File, Inc. ISBN 0-8160-3928-3.
- Kondis, Basil (1977). Balkan Studies. Institute for Balkan Studies, Society for Macedonian Studies.
- Laiou, Angeliki E. (2002), "Political History: An Outline", in Laiou, Angeliki E. (ed.), The Economic History of Byzantium: From the Seventh through the Fifteenth Century, Dumbarton Oaks, ISBN 978-0-88402-332-6
- Leggiere, Michael V. (2014). Blücher: Scourge of Napoleon. University of Oklahoma Press. ISBN 978-0-8061-4567-9.
- Lipp, Charles T. (2011), Noble Strategies in an Early Modern Small State: The Mahuet of Lorraine, University of Rochester Press
- Nicol, Donald M. (1993) [1972]. The Last Centuries of Byzantium, 1261–1453 (Second ed.). Cambridge: Cambridge University Press. ISBN 978-0-521-43991-6.
- Pálffy, Géza (2021), Hungary Between Two Empires 1526–1711, translated by Evans, David Robert, Indiana University Press
- Panzac, Daniel (2005). Barbary Corsairs. Leiden: Brill. ISBN 9789004125940.
- Pollo, Stefanaq (1984), Historia e Shqipërisë: Vitet 30 të shek. XIX-1912 [History of Albania: 1830s–1912] (in Albanian), Akademia e Shkencave e RPS të Shqipërisë, Instituti i Historisë, OCLC 165705732
- Purković, Miodrag (1978). Knez i despot Stefan Lazarević. Sveti arhijerejski sinod Srpske pravoslavne crkve.
- Ruvarac, Ilarion (1879). "Прилошци..." Гласник. 47. Državna štamparija.
- Strathern, Paul (2008). "The Retreat from Acre". Napoleon in Egypt. Random House. ISBN 978-0553905885.
- Streusand, Douglas E. (2011), Islamic Gunpowder Empires: Ottomans, Safavids, and Mughals, Philadelphia: Westview Press, ISBN 978-0813313597
- Treadgold, Warren (1997). A History of the Byzantine State and Society. Stanford, California: Stanford University Press. ISBN 0-8047-2630-2.
- Treadway, John D. (1983), "The Malissori Uprising of 1911", The Falcon and Eagle: Montenegro and Austria-Hungary, 1908–1914, West Lafayette, Indiana: Purdue University Press, ISBN 978-0-911198-65-2, OCLC 9299144
- Tucker, Spencer C., ed. (2019). "Vasvar, Treaty of (August 10, 1664)". Middle East Conflicts from Ancient Egypt to the 21st Century: An Encyclopedia and Document Collection. Vol. III. ABC-CLIO.
- Zachariadou, Elizabeth A. (1980). "Manuel II Palaeologos on the Strife between Bāyezīd I and Ḳāḍī Burhān al-Dīn Aḥmad". Bulletin of the School of Oriental and African Studies, University of London. 43 (3): 471–481. doi:10.1017/S0041977X00137395. JSTOR 615736. S2CID 160126444.
