= Földvár =

Földvár means hillfort in Hungarian. It may refer to:

== Hungary ==
- Balatonföldvár, a town in Somogy County
- Dunaföldvár, a town in Tolna County
- Pusztaföldvár, a village in Békés County
- Százhalombatta-Földvár, a Bronze-Age archaeological site
- Tiszaföldvár, a town in Jász-Nagykun-Szolnok County
- Abbey Földvár, founding site for the village of Németkér in Tolna County

== Romania ==
- Székelyföldvár, Hungarian name for Războieni-Cetate, a village in the municipality of Ocna Mureș (Marosújvár) in Alba County
- Melegföldvár, Hungarian name for Feldioara, a village in the commune of Cătina in Cluj County
- Barcaföldvár, Hungarian name for Feldioara, a commune in Brașov County

== Serbia ==
- Bácsföldvár, Hungarian name for Bačko Gradište, a village in Vojvodina

== Other uses ==
- Battle of Földvár, a battle that took place after the Battle of Szina in the Kingdom of Hungary
