= Siege of İnegöl =

1299 Turkish victory over the Byzantines

- Part of the Byzantine–Ottoman wars
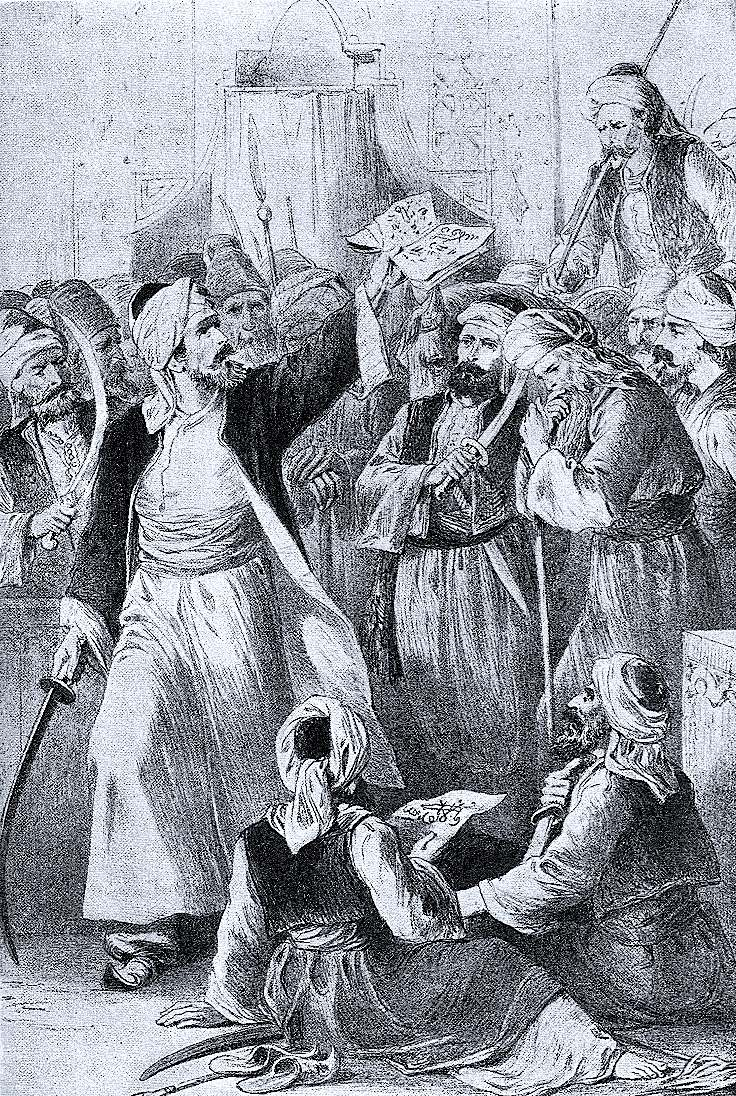
- Illustration of Osman rallying his warriors into battle
Date	28 September 1299
Location	İnegöl, Turkey
Result	Victory for Osman Ghazi's forces: Establishment of the Ottoman Beylik

Belligerents
Forces of Osman Ghazi: Kayı tribes	Byzantine Empire

Commanders and leaders
Osman Ghazi; Turgut Alp; Gündüz Alp †	(Byzantine Empire) Andronikos II Palaiologos (Byzantine Empire) Agios Nikolaos (executed)

The Siege of İnegöl took place between Agios Nikolaos, the governor of the fort, and the Kayı army under the command of Turgut Alp. This conquest was one of the first conquests in Ottoman history after the siege of Kulaca Hisar. After the end of the siege, Tekfur Nikolaos was executed by Turgut Alp. The conquest took place in 1299. This battle triggered the Battle of Bapheus, where the Byzantines attempted to reconquer the lost territory, which in turn led to the Siege of Bursa eventually leading to the establishment of the Ottoman Beylik.

== Prelude ==
Tensions had been rising between the Tekfur of İnegöl, Ayos Nikolaos, and Kayı Bey Osman I, which resulted in several clashes at Mount Armenia and the Domaniç, both of which resulted in Kayi victories (though with heavy losses including Osman I's brother Saru Batu Savcı Bey and his son Koca Saruhan Bey). Osman, in retaliation, conquered the fort of Kulaca Hisar, which was under the Nikolaos's dominion.

== Siege ==
The castle was besieged either during the end of 1298 or the beginning of 1299. The siege lasted for months, featuring relentless bombardment and starvation. However, Osman eventually gave the command to Turgut Alp to go and besiege the neighboring fort of Yarhisar. Turgut Bey stormed the fort, killing most of the garrison and executing Nikolaos (Osman conquered Yarhisar around the same time).

== Aftermath ==
This major conquest of a key fort in the Byzantine heartland of Anatolia led to the rise of the Kayi Beylik and to the eventual establishment of the Ottoman Empire. The chieftain Osman conquered other strategic forts along with the city of Yenişehir, literally translating to "New City", and turned it into a capital, thus forming the Ottoman Beylik.The Byzantines were alarmed by Osman's rapid conquests and eventually fought him in a climactic battle at Bapheus which resulted in a victory for the Ottoman Turks.
