= Turgut Alp =

Ottoman military commander

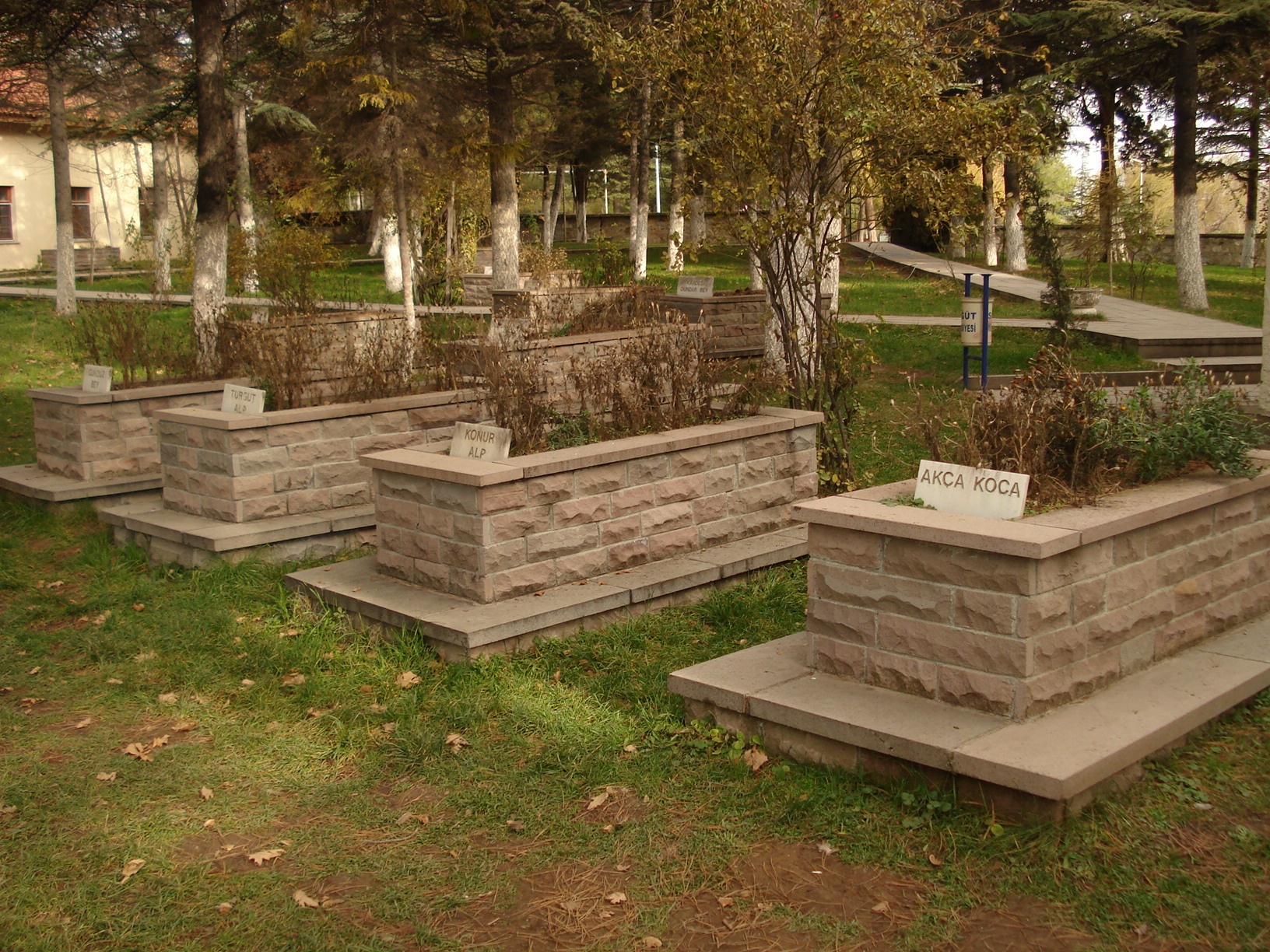
- Honorary grave of Turgut Alp (second from far-left)
- Died: after 1334; Inegöl
- Burial place: Turgutalp (Genci) village, İnegöl, Turkey
- Military career
- Allegiance: Ottoman Empire
- Service years: 1299-1335
- Rank: Military Commander
- Conflicts: Siege of İnegöl; Siege of Bursa

Turgut Alp (Ottoman Turkish: طورغود آلپ), also known as Turgut bey, was one of the warriors and Beys who fought for Ertuğrul, a Turkoman leader and bey, and Ertuğrul's son Osman I, the founder of the Ottoman Empire. After the establishment of the empire, he became one of its military commanders, serving Osman I, as well as his son, Orhan Gazi.

== Life ==
There is very little information about his life, and there is doubt he was a historical person. During the early Ottoman Conquests in the reign of Osman I, Turgut Alp was sent to Angelocoma (Αγγελόκωμα, present-day İnegöl) and he conquered the area. This area consisting some villages, was given to him by Osman I and his territory was called Turgut-ili (Province of Turgut). During the Siege of Bursa, Turgut Alp, along with Osman's warrior Mihal Gazi, participated in the conquest of Atranos Castle (later known as Orhaneli) in 1325, which played a key role in leading to the Ottoman conquest of Bursa during the reign of Sultan Orhan. He was also with Orhan during the conquest of Bursa (1326).

== Burial place ==
His tomb is located in the cemetery of Turgutalp (Genci) village, İnegöl, Turkey. The grave outside the Ertugrul Ghazi's mausoleum is an honorary grave, not the real burial place.

== Legacy ==
In 1877, during the Russo-Turkish War (1877-1878), a city was founded and named "Turgutalp" after him in the then-Ottoman Empire.

=== In fiction ===
Turgut Alp has been portrayed in the Turkish television series Kuruluş "Osmancık" (1988), Diriliş: Ertuğrul (2014—2019) and Kuruluş: Osman (2019—2025).

== See also ==
- Köse Mihal
- Konur Alp
- Abdurrahman Gazi
