= Turgutalp =

- Neighbourhood
- Location in Turkey Turgutalp (Turkey Aegean)
- Coordinates: 39°11′N 27°35′E
- Country: Turkey
- Province: Manisa
- District: Soma
- Elevation: 130 m (430 ft)
- Population (2022): 16,219
- Time zone: UTC+3 (TRT)
- Postal code: 45540
- Area code: 0236

Turgutalp is a neighbourhood of the municipality and district of Soma, Manisa Province, Turkey. Its population is 16,219 (2022). Before the 2013 reorganisation, it was a town (belde). It is situated to the south of Turkish state highway D240 and to the west of Soma to which it is almost merged to. The distance to Manisa is 97 kilometres (60 mi).

Turgutalp was founded by Muslim people from present Bulgaria in 1877, during the Russo-Turkish War (1877-1878). The settlement was named as Turgutalp upon the suggestion of the sultan (Turgut Alp was one of the early gazis of the Ottoman Empire). In 1986 it was declared a seat of township. Major economic sector of the town is agriculture. The main crops are tobacco, cotton, olive, tomato and wheat. Some town residents work in the power plant and coal mine of Soma.
