= Battle of Feldioara =

1529 battle between Habsburg Austria and Moldavia

- Part of the Campaign of 1529
Date	22 June 1529
Location	Földvár, Translyvania, Eastern Hungarian Kingdom (now Feldioara, Romania)
Result	Moldavian victory

Belligerents
Moldavia; Székelys	Holy Roman Empire (Austria) Habsburg Austria; Royal Hungary; Székelys (D)

Commanders and leaders
Petru Rareș; Grozav	(Holy Roman Empire) (Austria) Ferdinand I Bálint Török; István Majláth

Strength
10,000; 50 cannons	4,000; 50+ cannons

Casualties and losses
Unknown	Heavy: 50 cannons

The Battle of Feldioara or Battle of Földvár took place on 22 June 1529, between the forces of Moldavian voivode Petru Rareș and high vornic Grozav, and the army of Ferdinand I, King of Hungary and Archduke of Austria, which was commanded by Bálint Török and István Majláth. The battle resulted in Moldavian victory, with Székelys defecting to Moldavian side amidst the fighting.

== Prelude ==
During the power struggle between the two elected Hungarian kings, Ferdinand I and John Zápolya, over the Kingdom of Hungary, the Moldavian voivode Petru Rareș intervened in Transylvania, which was part of the Eastern Hungarian Kingdom ruled by King John. On 11 May or 10 June 1529, Zápolya asked Rareș for assistance in restoring his power, in exchange for placing Beszterce (now Bistrița, Romania) under Moldavian ownership. Voivode Rareș agreed to this proposal, leading to his involvement in the power struggle for Hungarian crown.

== Battle ==
On 22 June, Moldavian commander and high vornic (magistrate) Grozav led 10,000 troops supported by 50 cannons to an attack on Földvár (now Feldioara, Romania). The Habsburg side consisted of 4,000 defenders, notably commanded by Bálint Török and István Majláth.

The Moldavian side had a surprise advantage, as their sudden attack caught the Habsburg forces by surprise and didn't allow them to prepare their cannons. The situation of Habsburgs was worsened by the fact that Székelys parts of the Habsburg-led army defected to the Moldavian side, which further complicated the Habsburgs' position and led to their rout, losing a significant number of weapons during their chaotic retreat.

== Aftermath ==
The battle ended in Moldavian victory, with Székely elements of the Habsburg army defecting to Moldavians. The exact losses of the Habsburg forces are unknown, but were likely heavy and led to the capture of 50 cannons by Moldavians during the hasty retreat of Habsburg troops. The Brașov counts stated that "never has Țara Bârsei been struck by such a great misfortune".

On 11 November 1529, Moldavia placed Brașov, Bistrița, Rodna, Mediaș, Sighișoara and the region of Țara Bârsei under its control. Petru Rareș wanted to press further claims within Translyvania, stating in a 1530 letter addressed to the inhabitants of Brașov: "We have conquered Transylvania by the sword and we will not give it to anyone, neither to Ferdinand, nor to anyone else". He was unable to do so due to John Zápolya's threats to involve Ottomans in this matter, since Sultan Suleiman I supported Zápolya in his war against Habsburgs. Rareș didn't press further claims within Translyvania, instead shifting his focus to Polish-controlled Pokuttia for his expansion of Moldavia.
