= Siege of Kulaca Hisar =

1285 capture of the Byzantine fort of Kulaca by the Ottoman Empire

Siege of Kulacahisar
- Part of the Byzantine–Ottoman wars
Date	1285
Location	Kulaca, İnegöl, Turkey
Result	Kayi victory
Territorial changes	The Kayi Tribe captures Kulucahisar Castle from the Byzantines; Foundation of the Ottoman Beylik

Belligerents
Kayı	Byzantine Empire

Commanders and leaders
Osman Gazi; Turgut Alp; Konur Alp; Akçakoca; Abdurrahman Gazi	(Byzantine Empire) Agios Nikolaos

Strength
300 gazis	1,000

The Siege of Kulaca Hisar (Ottoman Turkish: فتحِ قلجه حصار, lit. 'Feth-i Kulaca Hisâr') was a battle fought between the Byzantines and the Turks under the command of Osman Gazi in 1285 for control of Fort Kulaca.

== Battle ==
After the reconquest of Constantinople, the Byzantine capital returned to Constantinople and their authority on the Anatolian frontiers was loosened. When Osman Bey came to power in the Kayi Tribe following the death of his father Ertuğrul Gazi, he established friendly relations with the Tekfurs of Yenisehir and Lefke. The landlord of Inegol, Aya Nikola was determined to reverse the encroachment of the Turks upon Bithynia and started plundering Kayi markets. When Osman Bey moved towards Inegol seeking retribution, he was ambushed at the Battle of Mount Armenia by Nikola and his retinue. The Kayi were vastly outnumbered so sustained heavy casualties. Even Bayhoca, son of his brother Savcı Bey and a renowned warrior, was killed. The Turkish cavalry managed to escape with their sword high to break the Byzantine line. There was no winner to this battle as both sides had to retreat back into their own lands and regroup.

== Siege ==
As revenge for all those slain on the mountain, Osman attacked the Byzantine-held Kulacahisar Castle, which is 5 kilometers away from Inegöl and located on the outskirts of Emirdağ to protect the city. A few men snuck into the fortress disguised as Romans, neutralized the guards and opened the gates. As a result of a night raid with a force of 2,000, the castle was captured by the Turks. This is the first castle conquered in the history of the Ottoman Empire. Since the captured Christian people of Kulaca Hisar accepted the rule of Osman Bey, they were not harmed.

== See also ==
- Siege of Bursa
- Karacahisar Castle
