= Uprising of Konstantin and Fruzhin =

Bulgarian uprising against Ottoman rule

- Part of the Bulgarian–Ottoman wars
Date	uncertain, 1404, 1408, 1413
Location	Ottoman Bulgaria, Bulgaria
Result	Ottoman victory

Belligerents
House of Sratsimir supported by: Kingdom of Hungary; Serbian Despotate; Principality of Wallachia	Ottoman Empire

Commanders and leaders
Konstantin II; Fruzhin	(Ottoman Empire) Süleyman Çelebi (Ottoman Empire) Musa Çelebi

Anonymous 19th-century (1800s) portraits
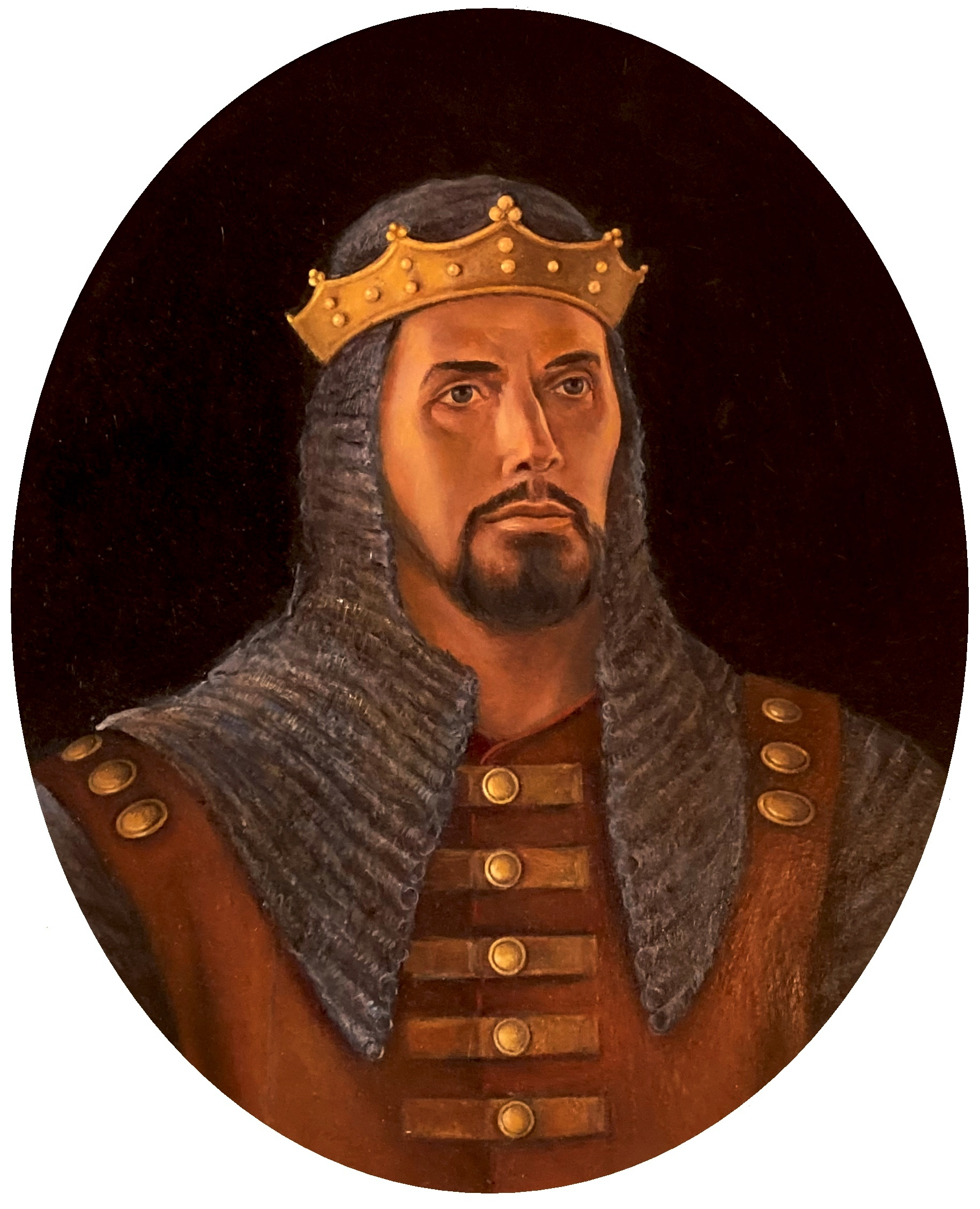
Konstantin

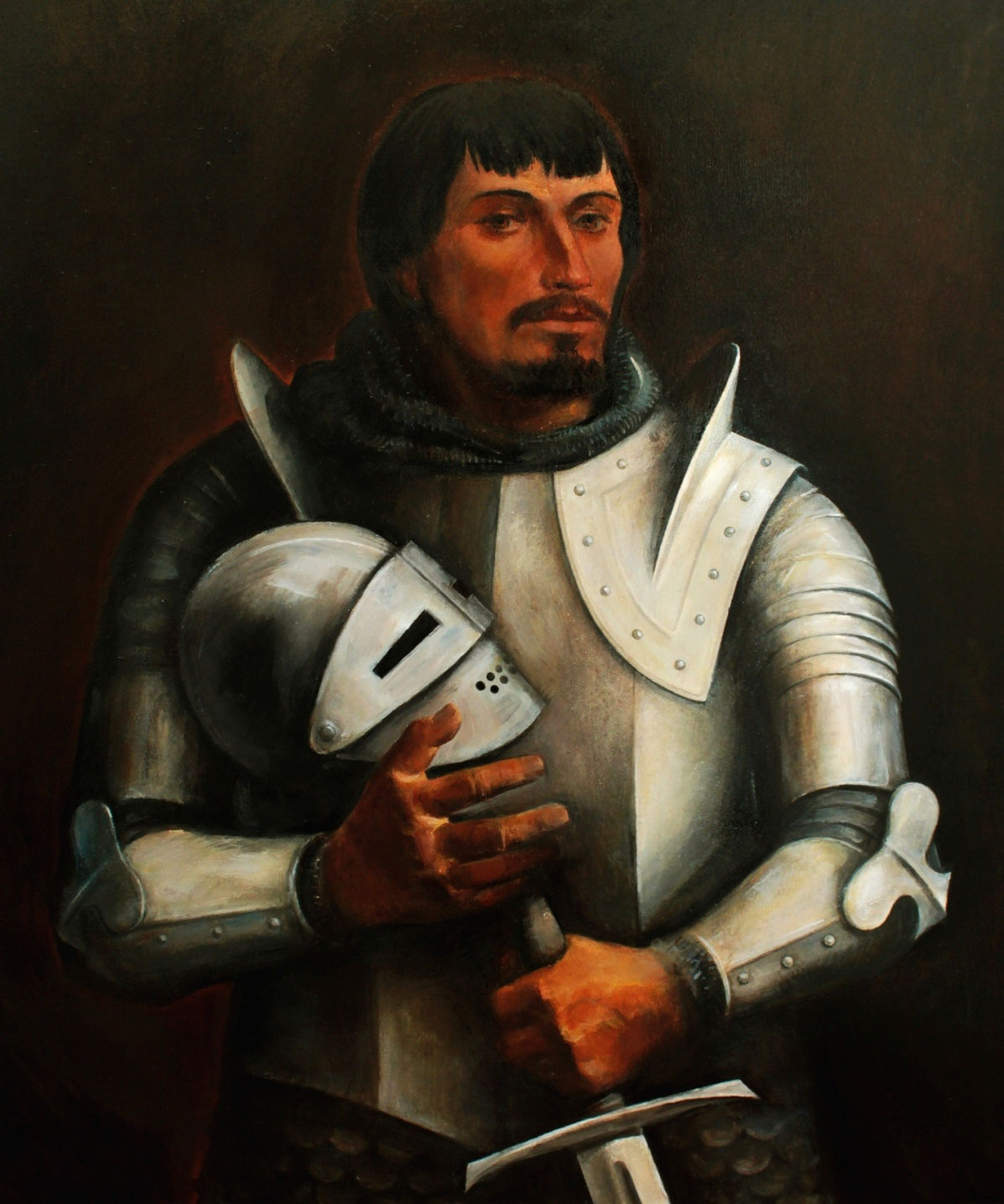
Fruzhin

The Uprising of Konstantin and Fruzhin (Bulgarian: Въстание на Константин и Фружин, Vastanie na Konstantin i Fruzhin) was the earliest Bulgarian uprising against Ottoman rule. It was organized in the early 15th century by two Bulgarian nobles, Fruzhin and his cousin Konstantin, and was supported by a Christian coalition, but failed to liberate Bulgaria.

Information about it is quite scarce and the details continue to be the subject of debate among historians. Almost nothing is known about the course of events; the years of its beginning and end, the exact area of its spread, etc. are controversial. Serbs, Hungarians, and Vlachs took part in the uprising on the side of Konstantin and Fruzin.

== Background ==
Fruzhin, the son of Tsar Ivan Shishman, and his cousin Konstantin, the heir of Ivan Sratsimir, who had emigrated to Hungary and Serbia as the Ottomans subjugated the Balkans (Note: However, some historians, such as Plamen Pavlov and Ivan Tyutyundzhiev, assume that Konstantin succeeded his father as Tsar (1397–1422), and controlled part of the Bulgarian lands, including Vidin, as a vassal, with some countries recognizing him as Tsar of the Bulgarians.), organized an uprising in northern Bulgaria aided by Wallachian ruler Mircea the Elder, Serbian despot Stefan Lazarević and Hungarian monarch Sigismund.

== Campaign ==
The Ottoman defeat by Timur in the Battle of Ankara of 1402 provided good conditions for an uprising, and the Christian forces crossed the Danube from the north into the Bulgarian lands: Mircea I, accompanied by Konstantin, invaded Dobruja, while Fruzhin together with the Serbian-supported Hungarian army entered the northwestern Bulgarian lands (around Vidin). These initially successful invasions were followed by an uprising of the Bulgarian population in some areas.

The scale, time and duration of the uprising is not certain. According to some sources, it broke out in 1404, but was quickly crushed by one of Bayezid I's sons, Süleyman, with Wallachia nevertheless retaining Dobruja and Stefan Lazarević extending his realm's territory, whereas Konstantin and Fruzhin's efforts were futile. Others claim that the uprising began in 1408, and Konstantin and Fruzhin managed to regain their domains from the late Bulgarian Empire south of the Danube at least until 1413, when Musa Çelebi, another son of Bayezid, is documented to have "ruined the Bulgarians". According to a third group of historians, who base their theory on the note of Doukas that Bulgarian delegates attended the Bursa negotiations between Mehmed I and Manuel II Palaiologos in 1413, the uprising was crushed as late as 1418 alongside several other unrelated rebellions.

== Aftermath ==
After the end of the uprising, its leaders Konstantin and Fruzhin once again settled abroad, Konstantin in Serbia and Fruzhin in Hungary. Konstantin died in 1422 in Serbia, while Fruzhin continued to work actively in Hungary to restore the Bulgarian Empire. He took part in Dan II's attack on Silistra in 1425, then again in 1426 against Vidin that is briefly recovered and put under Fruzhin's rule. Fruzhin also was granted the domain of Lippa (Lipova) in Temes (Timiș) by Sigismund at about the same time. Fruzhin was sent by the Hungarian king to help the Albanian rebels under Gjergj Arianit Komneni in 1435. He also participated in Władysław III of Poland's campaign that culminated in the Battle of Varna in 1444, and died around 1460.
