= Suleiman I's campaign of 1529 =

Military campaign

Hungarian campaign of Suleiman
- Part of the Ottoman–Habsburg wars Habsburg–Ottoman war of 1529–1533
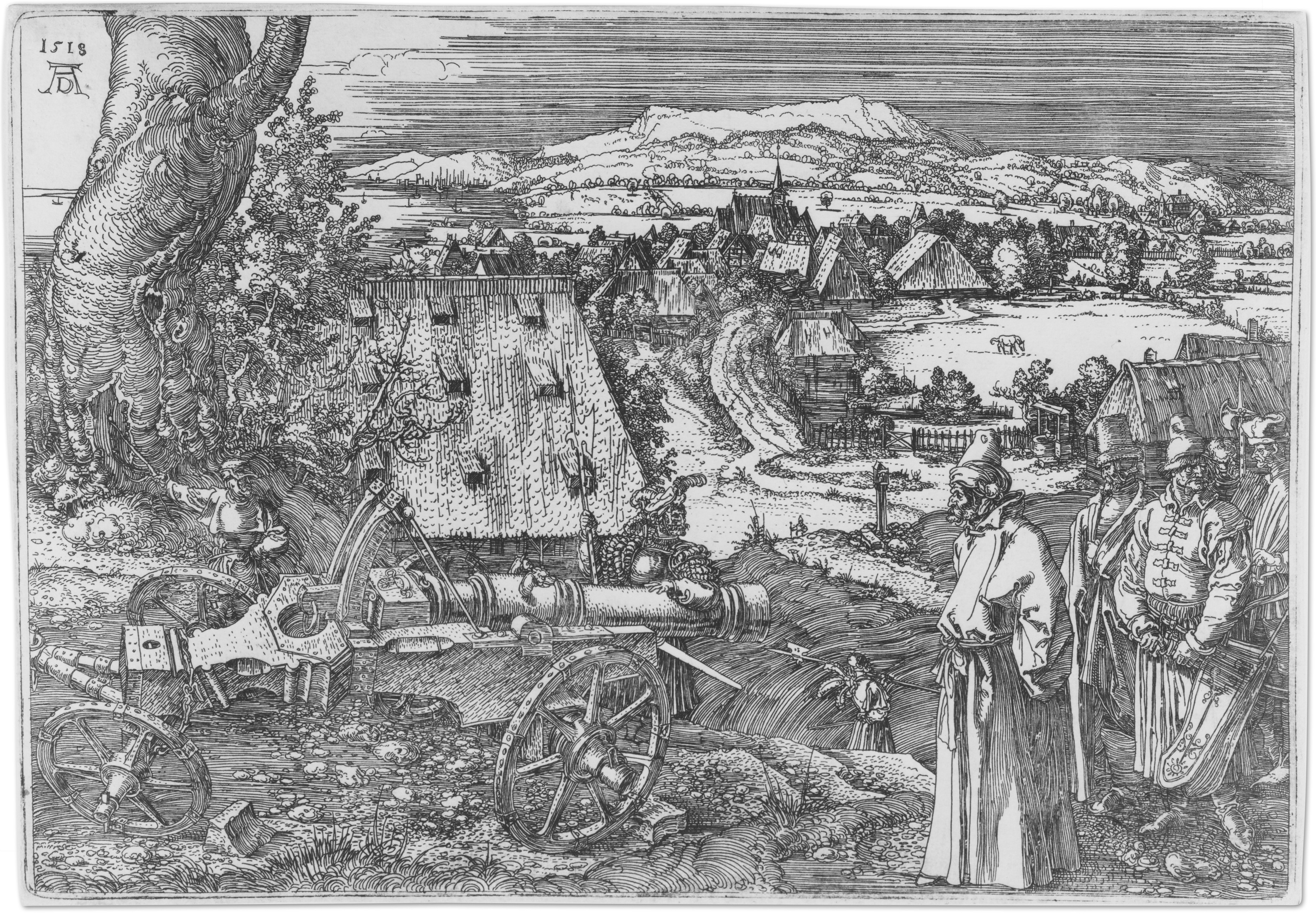
- "The Great Gun", a 1518 allegorical representation by Albrecht Dürer of the Turkish menace for the German lands.
Date	1529
Location	Kingdom of Hungary
Result	Ottoman–Moldavian victory
Territorial changes	Ottomans re-occupy Győr, Komárom, Esztergom and Buda; Moldavians occupy Brașov, Bistrița and Rodna

Belligerents
Habsburg Austria; Holy Roman Empire; Kingdom of Bohemia; Kingdom of Croatia; Ferdinand's Hungarian Kingdom	Ottoman Empire; Moldavia; John Szapolyai's Hungarian Kingdom

Commanders and leaders
Ferdinand I	Suleiman the Magnificent; Pargalı Ibrahim Pasha; Petru Rareș; John Szapolyai

Strength
Unknown	120,000 soldiers (including 12,000 Janissaries); 20,000 camels 300 guns 6,000 Hungarian horsemen

Casualties and losses
20,000 dead (soldiers and civilians)	40,000 dead

Suleiman I's campaign of 1529 was launched by the Ottoman Empire to take the Austrian capital Vienna and thereby strike a decisive blow, allowing the Ottomans to consolidate their hold on Hungary. This was in response to Ferdinand I's daring assault on Ottoman Hungary.

== Campaign ==
On 22 June 1529, the Moldavian army of voivode Petru Rareș inflicted a heavy defeat on Habsburg forces at the Battle of Feldioara, which strengthened the position of John Szapolyai and the faction of his Hungarian Kingdom.

Suleiman's march to Vienna was also an attempt to assist his vassal, John Szapolyai who claimed the throne of Hungary. Suleiman sent his army of 120,000 strong north on the 10 May. His campaign was marked by speedy success, on 8 September, Buda surrendered to the Ottomans and John Szapolyai was installed as King of Hungary. Suleiman then went further taking Esztergom, Tata, Komárom and Győr so that much of Ferdinand I's gains the previous two years were lost. On 27 September, Suleiman reached Vienna.

== Aftermath ==
The arrival of the Sultan's massive host in Central Europe caused much panic across Europe - Martin Luther, who had believed that the Ottomans were God's punishment against the sins of Christians modified his views and wrote the book the War with the Turks in 1529 urging that "the scourge of God" should be fought with great vigour. However, when Suleiman began besieging Vienna it would prove to be his first and most decisive blunder.

== Bibliography ==
- Clodfelter, M. (2017). Warfare and Armed Conflicts: A Statistical Encyclopedia of Casualty and Other Figures, 1492-2015 (4th ed.). McFarland. ISBN 978-0786474707.
- Madden, Thomas F. Crusades the Illustrated History. 1st ed. Ann Arbor: University of Michigan P, 2005
- Turnbull, Stephen. The Ottoman Empire 1326 - 1699. New York: Osprey, 2003.
