= Siege of Bursa =

1317–1326 capture of the Byzantine city of Prusa by the Ottoman Empire

Coordinates: 40.1833°N 29.0667°E

- Part of the Byzantine–Ottoman wars
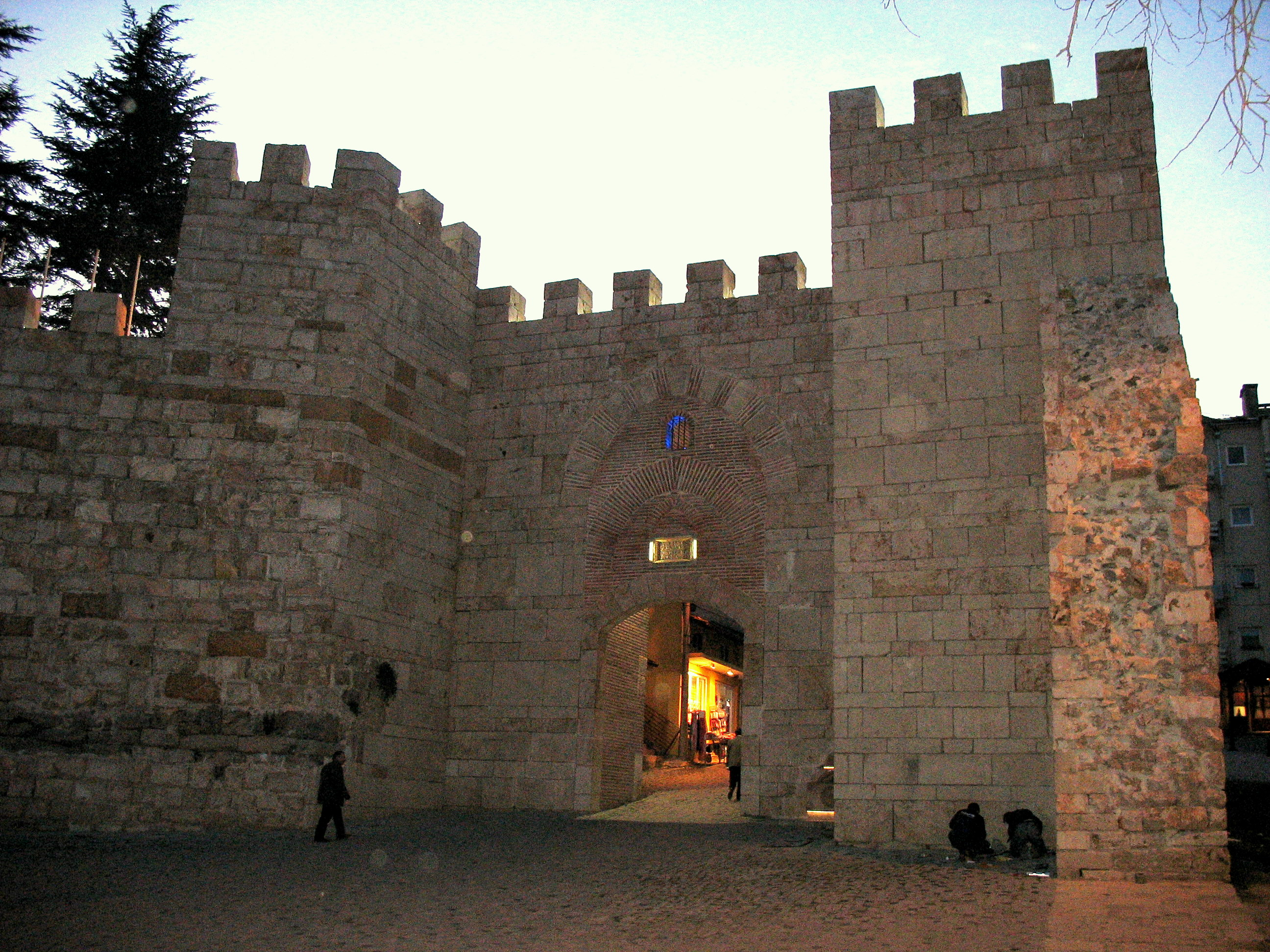
- Gate of Bursa castle
Date	1317 – April 6, 1326
Location	Prusa, Byzantine Empire (modern-day Bursa, Turkey)
Result	Ottoman victory; The Ottomans capture Bursa and establish their first capital.; Bursa becomes the first official capital of the Ottoman Beylik.

Belligerents
(Ottoman Empire) Ottoman Beylik	Byzantine Empire

Commanders and leaders
(Ottoman Empire) Osman Ghazi # (Ottoman Empire) Orhan Ghazi (Ottoman Empire) Köse Mihal	(Byzantine Empire) Saroz

Strength
Unknown	Unknown

The Siege of Bursa (Ottoman Turkish: فتحِ بورصه, romanized: Feth-i Bursa) took place from 1317 until the capture of Bursa on 6 April 1326, when the Ottoman Turks deployed a bold plan to seize the city, which was back then known as Prusa. The Ottomans had not captured a city before; the lack of expertise and adequate siege equipment at this stage of the war meant that the city fell only after six or nine years.

The historian, Laonikos Chalkokondyles, notes that the Ottomans took advantage of the Byzantine civil war of 1321–1328 to capture the city: "Andronikos decided that he should hold the throne himself, as his grandfather had already grown old, and so they fell out with each other. He was too stubborn to submit and caused endless trouble. He brought in the Serbs and allied himself with the leading Greeks in his struggle for the throne. As a result they could do nothing to prevent the Turks from crossing over into Europe. It was at this time that Prusa was besieged, starved out, and taken by Osman, and other cities in Asia Minor were also captured."

According to some sources Osman I died of natural causes just before the fall of the city, while others suggest that he lived long enough to hear about the victory on his death-bed and was buried in Bursa afterwards.

== Aftermath ==
After the fall of the city, his son and successor Orhan made Bursa the first official Ottoman capital and it remained so until 1366, when Edirne became the new capital. As a result, Bursa holds a special place in Ottoman history as their founding city, and also as the birthplace of Ottoman architecture (Bursa Grand Mosque (1399), Bayezid I Mosque (1395), Hüdavendigar Mosque (1385), and Yeşil Mosque) (1421). During his reign Orhan encouraged urban growth through the construction of buildings such as imarets, hammams, mosques, inns and caravanserais, and he also built a mosque and a medrese in what is now known as the Hisar district, and after his death was buried there in his türbe (mausoleum) next to his father. The Moroccan Muslim traveler Ibn Battuta who visited Bursa in 1331 was impressed by the sultan and found Bursa an enjoyable city "with fine bazaars and wide streets, surrounded on all sides by gardens and running springs."

== Importance ==
Paul K. Davis writes, "The capture of Bursa established Osman I and his successors as the major power in Asia Minor, beginning the Ottoman Empire."

== See also ==
- Siege of Kulaca Hisar
