= List of conflicts in Africa =

Wars and armed conflicts in Africa

This is a list of conflicts in Africa arranged by country, both on the continent and associated islands, including wars between African nations, civil wars, and wars involving non-African nations that took place within Africa. It encompasses pre-colonial wars, colonial wars, wars of independence, secessionist and separatist conflicts, major episodes of national violence (riots, massacres, etc.), and global conflicts in which Africa was a theatre of war.

== North Africa ==
=== Algeria ===
- 264 BC – 146 BC Punic Wars
- 112 BC – 106 BC Jugurthine War
- 49 BC – 45 BC Caesar's civil war
- 533 – 534 Vandalic War
- 533 – 548 Byzantine–Moorish wars
- 622 – 750 Early Muslim conquests
  - 629 – 1050s Arab–Byzantine wars
    - 647 – 709 Muslim conquest of the Maghreb
- 1299 – 1307 Siege of Tlemcen (1299–1307)
- 1335 – 1337 Siege of Tlemcen (1335–1337)
- 1492 – 1792 Spanish–Ottoman wars
  - 1519 Algiers expedition (1519)
  - 1526 – 1791 Ottoman–Habsburg wars
  - 1537 – 1540 Ottoman–Venetian War (1537–1540)
  - 1541 Algiers expedition (1541)
  - 1543 Spanish expedition to Tlemcen (1543)
  - 1543 Expedition to Mostaganem (1543)
  - 1555 Capture of Béjaïa (1555)
  - 1556 Siege of Oran (1556)
- 1526 – 1791 Ottoman–Habsburg wars
  - 1563 Sieges of Oran and Mers El Kébir
- 1535 Spanish expedition to Tlemcen (1535)
- 1550 – 1795 Conflicts between the Regency of Algiers and Morocco
- late 16th century Revolt of Sidi Yahia
- 1609 – 1628 Franco-Algerian war (1609–1628)
- 1628 Tunisian–Algerian War (1628)
- 1664 Djidjelli expedition
- 1681 – 1688 Franco–Algerian war (1681–1688)
- 1694 Tunisian–Algerian War (1694)
- 1707 – 1708 Siege of Oran (1707–1708)
- 1732 Spanish conquest of Oran (1732)
- 1769 – 1772 Danish–Algerian War
- 1775 – 1785 Spanish–Algerian War (1775–1785)
  - 1775 Invasion of Algiers (1775)
  - 1783 Bombardment of Algiers (1783)
  - 1784 Bombardment of Algiers (1784)
- 1785 – 1795 American–Algerian War (1785–1795)
- 1790 – 1792 Siege of Oran (1790–1792)
- 1801 – 1815 Barbary Wars
  - 1815 Second Barbary War
- 1807 Tunisian–Algerian War (1807)
- 1811 Action of 22 May 1811
- 1813 Tunisian–Algerian War (1813)
- 1816 Bombardment of Algiers (1816)
- 1830 – 1903 French conquest of Algeria
  - 1830 – 1875 Pacification of Algeria
  - 1871 – 1872 Mokrani Revolt
- 1898 1898 Algerian riots
- 1939 – 1945 World War II
  - 1940 – 1945 Mediterranean and Middle East theatre of World War II
    - 1940 – 1943 North African Campaign
      - 1942 Operation Torch
    - 1940 – 1945 Battle of the Mediterranean
- 1954 – 1962 Algerian War
  - 1958 May 1958 crisis
  - 1961 Algiers putsch of 1961
- 1963 – 1964 Sand War
- 1963 – 1964 Socialist Forces Front rebellion in Algeria
- 1965 1965 Algerian coup d'état
- 1967 1967 Algerian coup attempt
- 1970 – present Western Sahara conflict
- 1991 – 2002 Algerian Civil War
  - 1992 1992 Algerian coup d'état
- 2002 – ongoing Insurgency in the Maghreb (2002–present)
  - 2007 – ongoing Operation Juniper Shield

=== Egypt ===
==== Prehistoric Egypt ====
- c. 12th millennium BC War at Jebel Sahaba
- c. 3270 BC Siege of Naqada

==== Ancient Egypt ====
- c. 1206 – 1150 BC Late Bronze Age collapse
  - c. 1178 BC – 1175 BC Battle of the Nile Delta
- 525 BC First Achaemenid conquest of Egypt
- 499 BC – 449 BC Greco-Persian Wars
  - 477 BC – 449 BC Wars of the Delian League
- 340 BC – 339 BC Second Achaemenid conquest of Egypt
- 336 BC – 323 BC Wars of Alexander the Great
- 133 BC – 44 BC Crisis of the Roman Republic
  - 49 BC – 45 BC Caesar's civil war
  - 32 BC – 30 BC War of Actium

==== Roman Egypt ====
- 49 BC – 45 BC Caesar's civil war
- 115 – 117 Diaspora Revolt
- 235 – 284 Crisis of the Third Century
  - 270 Palmyrene invasion of Egypt
- 602 – 628 Byzantine–Sasanian War of 602–628
  - 618 – 621 Sasanian conquest of Egypt

==== Rashidun Caliphate ====
- 629 – 1050s Arab–Byzantine wars
  - 639 – 642 Arab conquest of Egypt
- 656 – 661 First Fitna
  - 658 Umayyad invasions of Egypt

==== Umayyad Caliphate ====
- 720 – 832 Bashmurian revolts

==== Abbasid Caliphate ====
- 629 – 1050s Arab–Byzantine wars
  - 639 – 642 Arab conquest of Egypt
- 914 – 915 Fatimid invasion of Egypt (914–915)
- 919 – 921 Fatimid invasion of Egypt (919–921)
- 969 Fatimid conquest of Egypt

==== Fatimid Caliphate ====
- 971 First Qarmatian invasion of Egypt
- 973 – 974 Second Qarmatian invasion of Egypt
- 1095 – 1303 Crusades
  - 1163 – 1169 Crusader invasions of Egypt
- 1169 Battle of the Blacks

==== Ayyubid Sultanate ====
- 1095 – 1303 Crusades
  - 1217 – 1221 Fifth Crusade
  - 1248 – 1254 Seventh Crusade
- 1173 Turan-Shah's Nubian campaign

==== Mamluk Sultanate ====
- 1251 Battle of al-Kura
- 1365 Alexandrian Crusade
- 1367 Battle of Cairo (1367)
- 1516 – 1517 Ottoman–Mamluk War (1516–1517)

==== Ottoman Egypt ====
- 1492 – 1792 Spanish–Ottoman wars
- 1768 – 1774 Russo-Turkish war (1768–1774)
- 1792 – 1802 French Revolutionary Wars
  - 1798 – 1802 War of the Second Coalition
    - 1798 – 1801 French invasion of Egypt and Syria
- 1803 – 1807 Muhammad Ali's seizure of power
- 1807 – 1809 Anglo-Turkish War (1807–1809)
- 1821 – 1829 Greek War of Independence

==== Khedivate of Egypt ====
- 1879 – 1882 Urabi revolt
- 1881 – 1899 Mahdist War
- 1882 Anglo-Egyptian War

==== Sultanate of Egypt ====
- 1914 – 1918 World War I
  - 1914 – 1918 Middle Eastern theatre of World War I
    - 1915 – 1918 Sinai and Palestine campaign
  - 1914 – 1918 African theatre of World War I
    - 1915 – 1916 North African theatre of World War I
      - 1915 – 1917 Senussi campaign
- 1918 – 1919 1919 Egyptian revolution

==== Kingdom of Egypt ====
- 1939 – 1945 World War II
  - 1940 – 1945 Mediterranean and Middle East theatre of World War II
    - 1940 – 1943 North African Campaign
      - 1940 – 1943 Western Desert campaign
    - 1940 – 1945 Battle of the Mediterranean
  - 1942 1942 Abdeen Palace incident
- 1948 – 1949 1948 Arab–Israeli War
- 1952 Battle of Ismailia (1952)
- 1952 1952 Egyptian revolution

==== Arab Republic of Egypt ====
- 1956 Suez Crisis
- 1967 Six-Day War
- 1973 Yom Kippur War
- 1977 Libyan–Egyptian War
- 1981 – present Terrorism in Egypt
  - 2011 – 2023 Sinai insurgency
  - 2013 – present Terrorism in Egypt (2013–present)
- 1986 1986 Egyptian conscripts riot
- 2014 2014 Aswan tribal clashes

=== Libya ===
- 264 BC – 146 BC Punic Wars
- 112 BC – 106 BC Jugurthine War
- 429 – 442 Vandal conquest of Roman Africa
- 461 – 468 Vandal War (461–468)
- 533 – 534 Vandalic War
- 647 – 709 Muslim conquest of the Maghreb
- 761 Abbasid conquest of Ifriqiya
- 1510 Spanish conquest of Tripoli
- 1526 – 1791 Ottoman–Habsburg wars
  - 1551 – 1559 Italian War of 1551–1559
- 1681 – 1685 French–Tripolitania War
- 1699 – 1702 Maghrebi war (1699–1702)
- 1705 Siege of Tripoli (1705)
- 1711 1711 Karamanli coup
- 1728 Bombardment of Tripoli (1728)
- 1790 – 1795 Tripolitanian civil war
- 1797 Action of 16 May 1797
- 1801 – 1805 First Barbary War
- 1825 Battle of Tripoli (1825)
- 1828 Bombardment of Tripoli (1828)
- 1835 – 1858 1835-1858 revolt in Ottoman Tripolitania
- 1860 – 1890 Barasa–Ubaidat War
- 1911 – 1932 Libyan resistance movement
  - 1911 – 1912 Italo-Turkish War
    - 1911 Italian invasion of Libya
  - 1923 – 1932 Second Italo-Senussi War
- 1914 – 1918 World War I
  - 1914 – 1918 African theatre of World War I
    - 1915 – 1916 Military operations in North Africa during World War I
      - 1915 – 1917 Senussi campaign
- 1920 – 1922 1920–1922 Jabal al-Gharbi civil war
- 1939 – 1945 World War II
  - 1940 – 1945 Mediterranean and Middle East theatre of World War II
    - 1940 – 1943 North African campaign
      - 1940 – 1943 Western Desert Campaign
    - 1940 – 1945 Battle of the Mediterranean
- 1957 Battle of Essien (1957)
- 1969 1969 Libyan revolution
- 1969 1969 Libyan coup attempt
- 1970 Black Prince conspiracy
- 1977 Egyptian-Libyan War
- 1981 Gulf of Sidra incident (1981)
- 1984 Bab al-Azizia siege
- 1986 Action in the Gulf of Sidra (1986)
- 1986 1986 United States bombing of Libya
- 1989 1989 air battle near Tobruk
- 1993 1993 Libyan coup attempt
- 2002 – present Insurgency in the Maghreb (2002–present)
- 2008 2008 Kufra conflict
- 2011 – present Libyan crisis
  - 2011 Libyan civil war (2011)
  - 2011 – 2014 Factional violence in Libya (2011–2014)
  - 2014 – 2020 Libyan civil war (2014–present)
  - 2022 2022 Tripoli clashes
  - 2023 2023 Tripoli clashes
  - 2025 2025 Tripoli clashes
  - 2026 2026 Ras Ajdir skirmishes

=== Morocco ===
- 264 BC – 146 BC Punic Wars
- 112 BC – 106 BC Jugurthine War
- 429 – 442 Vandal conquest of Roman Africa
- 533 – 534 Vandalic War
- 647 – 709 Muslim conquest of the Maghreb
- 718 – 1492 Reconquista
- 739 – 743 Berber Revolt
- 1033 1033 Fez massacre
- 1260 Battle of Salé
- 1415 – 1769 Moroccan-Portuguese conflicts
  - 1437 Battle of Tangier (1437)
  - 1458 Portuguese conquest of Ksar es-Seghir
  - 1463 – 1464 Siege of Tangier (1463–1464)
  - 1468 Anfa expedition (1468)
  - 1471 Conquest of Asilah
  - 1471 Portuguese conquest of Tangier
  - 1487 Chaouia expedition
  - 1490 Targa expedition (1490)
  - 1513 Battle of Azemmour
  - 1514 Battle of Tednest
  - 1514 Battle of the Alcaides
  - 1515 Raid of Marrakesh (1515)
  - 1515 Battle of Mamora (1515)
  - 1516 Portuguese expedition to Doukkala (1516)
  - 1533 Siege of Agadir (1533)
  - 1541 Fall of Agadir
  - 1562 Siege of Mazagan (1562)
  - 1578 Battle of Alcácer Quibir
  - 1640 Mazagan Ambush
  - 1696 Battle of Mamora (1696)
  - 1769 Siege of Mazagan (1769)
- 1465 1465 Moroccan revolt
- 16th century – 19th century Barbary–Portuguese conflicts
- 1550 – 1795 Conflicts between the Regency of Algiers and Morocco
- 1565 Blockade of the Tetuan River
- 1614 Capture of La Mámora
- 1680 Great Siege of Tangier
- 1681 Siege of Mamora (1681)
- 1689 Siege of Larache (1689)
- 1690 – 1691 Siege of Asilah (1690–1691)
- 1765 Larache expedition
- 1775 – 1777 Dutch–Moroccan War (1775–1777)
- 1784 Moroccan seizure of the Betsey
- 1844 First Franco-Moroccan War
- 1851 Bombardment of Salé (1851)
- 1856 Battle of Tres Forcas
- 1859 – 1860 Hispano-Moroccan War (1859–60)
- 1893 Tafilalt expedition
- 1893 – 1894 First Melillan campaign
- 1905 – 1906 Tangier Crisis
- 1907 – 1934 French conquest of Morocco
- 1907 – 1908 Hafidiya
  - 1908 Battle of Marrakesh
- 1909 Second Melillan campaign
- 1911 Agadir Crisis
- 1911 – 1912 Kert campaign
- 1914 – 1918 World War I
  - 1914 – 1921 Zaian War
- 1920 – 1926 Rif War
  - 1940 – 1945 Mediterranean and Middle East theatre of World War II
    - 1940 – 1943 North African Campaign
- 1957 – 1958 Ifni War
- 1958 – 1959 Rif Revolt
- 1963 – 1964 Sand War
- 1970 – present Western Sahara conflict
  - 1975 – 1991 Western Sahara War
- 1971 1971 Moroccan coup attempt
- 1972 1972 Moroccan coup attempt
- 2002 – present Insurgency in the Maghreb (2002–present)
  - 2007 – present Operation Juniper Shield

=== Sudan ===
- c. 1506 BC Egyptian Invasion of Kerma
- 622 – 750 Early Muslim conquests
  - 642 First battle of Dongola
  - 652 Second battle of Dongola
- 1820 – 1824 Turco-Egyptian conquest of Sudan (1820–1824)
- 1873 – 1874 Conquest of Darfur (1873–1874)
- 1881 – 1899 Mahdist War
- 1908 Wad Habuba Revolt
- 1914 – 1918 World War I
  - 1915 – 1916 Military operations in North Africa during World War I
    - 1916 Invasion of Darfur (1916)
- 1939 – 1945 World War II
  - 1940 – 1945 Mediterranean and Middle East theatre of World War II
    - 1940 – 1941 East African campaign (World War II)
- 1955 – 1972 First Sudanese Civil War
  - 1958 1958 Sudanese coup d'état
  - 1969 1969 Sudanese coup d'état
- 1983 – 2005 Second Sudanese Civil War
  - 1985 1985 Sudanese coup d'état
  - 1987 – 1989 War of the Tribes
  - 1989 1989 Sudanese coup d'état
- 1998 Operation Infinite Reach
- 2003 – 2020 War in Darfur
  - 2008 2008 Omdurman attack
- 2006 Battle of Malakal
- 2008 – present Sudanese nomadic conflicts
  - 2009 2009 Sobat River ambush
  - 2010 2010 South Darfur clash
- 2009 2009 Sudan airstrikes
- 2011 – 2020 Sudanese conflict in South Kordofan and Blue Nile
- 2012 Heglig Crisis
- 2018 – 2019 Sudanese Revolution
  - 2019 2019 Sudanese coup d'état
- 2021 September 2021 Sudanese coup attempt
- 2021 2021 Sudanese coup d'état
- 2022 – 2023 Blue Nile clashes (2022–2023)
- 2023 2023 Kosti clashes
- 2023 2023 Foro Baranga clashes
- 2023 – present Sudanese civil war (2023–present)

=== Tunisia ===
==== Carthaginian Empire ====
- 264 BC – 146 BC Punic Wars
  - 264 BC – 241 BC First Punic War
  - 240 BC – 238 BC Mercenary War
  - 218 BC – 201 BC Second Punic War
  - 149 BC – 146 BC Third Punic War

==== Kingdom of Numidia ====
- 112 BC – 106 BC Jugurthine War

==== Roman Province of Africa ====
- 83 BC – 82 BC Sulla's civil war
- 49 BC – 45 BC Caesar's civil war
- 235 – 284 Crisis of the Third Century
- 429 – 432 Vandal conquest of Roman Africa
- 439 Vandal War (439-442)
- 461 – 468 Vandal War (461–468)

==== Vandal Kingdom ====
- 533 – 534 Vandalic War

==== Byzantine Praetorian Prefecture of Africa ====
- 533 – 548 Byzantine–Moorish wars

==== Byzantine Exarchate of Africa ====
- 647 – 709 Muslim conquest of the Maghreb
  - 698 Battle of Carthage (698)

==== Aghlabids ====
- 1087 Mahdia campaign of 1087

==== Almohad Caliphate ====
- 1159 – 1160 Almohad conquest of Ifriqiya

==== Hafsid Dynasty ====
- 1095 – 1303 Crusades
  - 1269 Eighth Crusade
- 1329 Capture of Tunis (1329)
- 1390 Barbary Crusade
- 1424 Aragonese expedition to Tunisia of 1424

==== Ottoman Tunisia ====
- 1492 – 1792 Spanish–Ottoman wars
  - 1526 – 1791 Ottoman–Habsburg wars
- 1665 Action of March 1665
- 1699 – 1702 Maghrebi war (1699–1702)
  - 1699 – 1700 Constantine campaign (1699–1700)
- 1675 – 1705 Revolutions of Tunis

==== Beylik of Tunis ====
- 1705 Tunisian–Algerian War (1705)
- 1735 Capture of Tunis (1735)
- 1742 Tabarka expedition (1742)
- 1756 Capture of Tunis (1756)
- 1784 – 1786 Venetian bombardments of the Beylik of Tunis
- 1811 Action of 22 May 1811
- 1813 Tunisian–Algerian War (1813)
- 1864 – 1865 Mejba Revolt
- 1881 French conquest of Tunisia

==== French Protectorate of Tunisia ====
- 1939 – 1945 World War II
  - 1940 – 1945 Mediterranean and Middle East theatre of World War II
    - 1940 – 1943 North African campaign
      - 1942 – 1943 Tunisian campaign
    - 1940 – 1945 Battle of the Mediterranean
- 1952 – 1954 Tunisian Guerilla War

==== Republic of Tunisia ====
- 1961 Bizerte crisis
- 1961 Battle of marker 233
- 1980 1980 Gafsa Uprising
- 1985 Operation Wooden Leg
- 1987 1987 Tunisian coup d'état
- 2002 – present Insurgency in the Maghreb (2002–present)
  - 2006 – 2007 2006–2007 Tunisia clashes
    - 2007 Soliman shooting
  - 2012 – 2019 Chaambi Operations
  - 2014 Raoued Operation
- 2011 First Libyan Civil War
- 2013 Battle of Sidi Ali Ben Aoun
- 2015 – 2022 ISIL insurgency in Tunisia
- 2021 2021 Tunisian self-coup

=== Western Sahara ===
- 1970 – present Western Sahara conflict
  - 1973 – 1976 Sahrawi insurgency
  - 1975 Green March
  - 1975 – 1991 Western Sahara War
  - 2020 – present Western Saharan clashes (2020–present)

== East Africa ==
=== Burundi ===
- 1914 – 1918 World War I
  - 1914 – 1918 African theatre of World War I
    - 1914 – 1918 East African Campaign (World War I)
- 1965 1965 Burundian coup attempt
- 1966 July 1966 Burundian coup d'état
- 1966 November 1966 Burundian coup d'état
- 1976 1976 Burundian coup d'état
- 1987 1987 Burundian coup d'état
- 1993 – 2005 Burundi Civil War
  - 1993 1993 Burundian coup attempt
  - 1996 1996 Burundian coup d'état
  - 2001 2001 Burundian coup attempt
- 2004 – present Kivu conflict
- 2015 – 2018 Burundian unrest
  - 2015 2015 Burundian coup attempt

=== Comoros ===
- 1803 – 1815 Napoleonic Wars
  - 1809 – 1811 Mauritius campaign of 1809–1811
- 1978 1978 Comorian coup d'état
- 1995 Operation Azalee
- 1999 1999 Comorian coup d'état
- 2008 Invasion of Anjouan
- 2013 2013 Comorian coup attempt

=== Djibouti ===
- 1874 – 1885 Egyptian Invasion of Harar
- 1939 – 1945 World War II
  - 1940 – 1945 Mediterranean and Middle East theatre of World War II
    - 1940 – 1941 East African campaign (World War II)
- 1991 – 1994 Djiboutian Civil War
- 2008 Djiboutian–Eritrean border conflict

=== Eritrea ===
- 1529 – 1543 Ethiopian–Adal War
- 1557 – 1624 Ottoman conquest of Habesh
- 1874 – 1876 Egyptian–Ethiopian War
- 1881 – 1899 Mahdist War
- 1894 Battle of Halai
- 1895 – 1896 First Italo-Ethiopian War
- 1935 – 1936 Second Italo-Ethiopian War
- 1939 – 1945 World War II
  - 1940 – 1945 Mediterranean and Middle East theatre of World War II
    - 1940 – 1941 East African campaign (World War II)
- 1961 – 1991 Eritrean War of Independence
  - 1972 – 1981 Eritrean Civil Wars
    - 1972 – 1974 First Eritrean Civil War
    - 1980 – 1981 Second Eritrean Civil War
- 1995 – 2018 Second Afar insurgency
- 1995 Hanish Islands conflict
- 1998 – 2018 Eritrean–Ethiopian border conflict
  - 1998 – 2000 Eritrean–Ethiopian War
  - 2010 2010 Eritrean–Ethiopian border skirmish
  - 2016 Battle of Tsorona
- 2008 Djiboutian–Eritrean border conflict
- 2013 2013 Eritrean Army mutiny
- 2018 – present Ethiopian civil conflict (2018–present)
  - 2020 – 2022 Tigray War
    - 2020 – 2022 Spillover of the Tigray war

=== Ethiopia ===
==== Makhzumi Dynasty ====
- 1270 Battle of Ansata

==== Ethiopian Empire ====
- 1314 – 1344 Amda Seyon I's expansions
  - 1332 Battle of Das
- 1410 Battle of Zeila
- 1413 Battle of Serjan
- 1413 Battle of Zikr Amhara
- 1422 Battle of Yedaya
- 1423 Siege of Mukha
- 1445 Battle of Gomit
- 16th century – 17th century Oromo expansion
- 1520 – 1526 Adalite Civil War
- 1529 – 1543 Ethiopian–Adal War
- 1538 – 1560 Ottoman–Portuguese conflicts (1538–1560)
- 1563 Battle of Endagabatan
- 1569 Battle of Hadiya (1569)
- 1576 Battle of Webi River
- 1769 – 1855 Zemene Mesafint
  - 1771 Three battles of Sarbakusa
  - 1788 Battle of Madab
  - 1831 Battle of Debre Abbay
  - 1839 Battle of Konzoula
  - 1842 Battle of Debre Tabor
  - 1852 Battle of Gur Amba
  - 1853 Battle of Takusa
  - 1853 Battle of Ayshal
  - 1854 Battle of Amba Jebelli
  - 1855 Battle of Derasge
- 1832 – 1848 Ethiopian–Ottoman border conflict
- 1867 – 1868 British Expedition to Abyssinia
- 1871 Battle of the Assem
- 1874 – 1876 Egyptian–Ethiopian War
- 1874 – 1885 Egyptian Invasion of Harar
- 1878 – 1904 Menelik II's conquests
- 1881 – 1899 Mahdist War
- 1895 – 1896 First Italo-Ethiopian War
- 1896 – 1920 Somaliland campaign
- 1916 Battle of Segale
- 1928 1928 Ethiopian coup d'état attempt
- 1929 – 1930 Gugsa Wale's rebellion
- 1935 – 1937 Second Italo-Ethiopian War
- 1939 Arbegnoch rebellion of 1939
- 1939 – 1945 World War II
  - 1940 – 1945 Mediterranean and Middle East theatre of World War II
    - 1940 – 1941 East African campaign (World War II)
    - 1941 – 1943 Italian guerrilla war in Ethiopia
- 1943 Woyane rebellion
- 1948 – present Ethiopian–Somali conflict
  - 1963 – 1970 Bale revolt
  - 1963 – 1965 1963–1965 Ogaden rebellion
  - 1964 1964 Ethiopian–Somali Border War
- 1960 1960 Ethiopian coup attempt
- 1973 – present Oromo conflict
- 1974 Ethiopian Revolution
- 1974 – 1991 Ethiopian Civil War
  - 1974 1974 Ethiopian coup d'état

==== Provisional Military Government of Socialist Ethiopia ====
- 1948 – present Ethiopian–Somali conflict
  - 1977 – 1978 Ogaden War
  - 1982 1982 Ethiopian–Somali Border War
- 1974 – 1991 Ethiopian Civil War
- 1981 – 1991 Somaliland War of Independence

==== Federal Democratic Republic of Ethiopia ====
- 1973 – present Oromo conflict
- 1985 – 2023 Gambela conflict
- 1991 – presentSomali Civil War
  - 2009 – present Somali Civil War (2009–present)
    - 2022 2022 al-Shabaab invasion of Ethiopia
- 1992 – 2018 Insurgency in Ogaden
- 1994 – present Ethnic violence in Konso
- 1994 – present Ethnic violence against Amaro Koore
- 1995 – 2018 Gedeo-Guji clashes
- 1998 – 2018 Eritrean–Ethiopian border conflict
  - 1998 – 2000 Eritrean–Ethiopian War
  - 2010 2010 Eritrean–Ethiopian border skirmish
  - 2016 Battle of Tsorona
- 2002 – present Operation Enduring Freedom – Horn of Africa
- 2005 2005 Ethiopian general election violence
- 2012 Moyale clashes
- 2016 – 2018 Oromo–Somali clashes
- 2018 – present Ethiopian civil conflict (2018–present)
  - 2018 – present OLA insurgency
  - 2019 Amhara Region coup attempt
  - 2019 – 2022 Benishangul-Gumuz conflict
  - 2020 – 2024 Afar–Somali clashes
  - 2020 – 2022 Tigray War
  - 2020 – 2022 Al-Fashaga conflict
  - 2023 – present Fano insurgency

=== Madagascar ===
- 1883 – 1895 Franco-Hova Wars
  - 1883 – 1885 First Madagascar expedition
  - 1894 – 1895 Second Madagascar expedition
- 1895 – 1897 Menalamba rebellion
- 1904 – 1905 1904–1905 uprising in Madagascar
- 1915 – 1917 Sadiavahy Rebellion
- 1939 – 1945 World War II
  - 1940 – 1945 Indian Ocean campaign
    - 1942 Battle of Madagascar
- 1947 – 1949 Malagasy Uprising
- 2006 2006 Malagasy coup attempt
  - 2009 2009 Malagasy political crisis
- 2009 2009 Camp Capsat mutiny
- 2010 2010 Madagascar coup attempt
- 2025 2025 Malagasy coup d'état

=== Malawi ===
- 1915 Chilembwe uprising
- 1959 – 1960 Nyasaland emergency of 1959
  - 1959 Operation Sunrise (Nyasaland)
- 1992 – 1993 Operation Bwezani

=== Mauritius ===
- 1792 – 1797 War of the First Coalition
- 1792 – 1802 French Revolutionary Wars
  - 1793 – 1801 East Indies theatre of the French Revolutionary Wars
- 1803 – 1815 Napoleonic Wars
  - 1809 – 1811 Mauritius campaign of 1809–1811

=== Mozambique ===
- 16th century – 20th century Zimbabwean–Portuguese conflicts
- 1847 – 1910 Angoche–Portuguese conflicts (1847–1910)
- 1895 Battle of Marracuene
- 1895 Battle of Coolela
- 1897 Second Battle of Macontene
- 1914 – 1918 World War I
  - 1914 – 1918 African theatre of World War I
    - 1914 – 1918 East African campaign (World War I)
  - 1917 – 1918 Barue uprising
- 1964 – 1974 Mozambican War of Independence
- 1964 – 1979 Rhodesian Bush War
- 1977 – 1992 Mozambican Civil War
- 2013 – 2021 RENAMO insurgency (2013–2021)
- 2017 – ongoing Insurgency in Cabo Delgado

=== Kenya ===
- 1500 – 1509 Portuguese conquest of the East African coast
  - 1505 Battle of Mombasa (1505)
- 1528 Battle of Mombasa (1528)
- 1586 – 1589 Ottoman–Portuguese conflicts (1586–1589)
  - 1589 Battle of Mombasa (1589)
- 1696 – 1698 Siege of Mombasa (1696–1698)
- 1813 Battle of Shela
- 1914 – 1918 World War I
  - 1914 – 1918 African theatre of World War I
    - 1914 – 1918 East African Campaign (World War I)
- 1939 – 1945 World War II
  - 1940 – 1945 Mediterranean and Middle East theatre of World War II
    - 1940 – 1941 East African Campaign (World War II)
- 1952 – 1960 Mau Mau Uprising
- 1963 – present Somali–Kenyan conflict
  - 1963 – 1967 Shifta War
- 1982 1982 Kenyan coup attempt
- 1987 – 1990 Kenyan-Ugandan border conflict
- 1998 – present Terrorism in Kenya
  - 2013 Westgate shopping mall attack
  - 2019 Nairobi DusitD2 complex attack
- 2005 – 2008 Mount Elgon insurgency
- 2007 – 2008 2007–2008 Kenyan crisis
- 2009 – present Somali Civil War (2009–present)
- 2012 – 2013 2012–2013 Tana River District clashes
- 2012 Baragoi clashes

=== Réunion ===
- 1803 – 1815 Napoleonic Wars
  - 1809 – 1811 Mauritius campaign of 1809–1811
- 1939 – 1945 World War II
  - 1940 – 1945 Indian Ocean campaign

=== Rwanda ===
- 1896 Battle of Shangi
- 1912 Ndungutse's rebellion
- 1914 – 1918 World War I
  - 1914 – 1918 African theatre of World War I
    - 1914 – 1918 East African Campaign (World War I)
- 1959 – 1961 Rwandan Revolution
- 1961 Coup of Gitarama
- 1963 Bugesera invasion
- 1973 1973 Rwandan coup d'état
- 1990 – 1994 Rwandan Civil War
- 2004 – present Kivu conflict
  - 2022 – 2025 Democratic Republic of the Congo–Rwanda conflict (2022–present)
- 2012 2012 Congolese–Rwandan border clash

=== Seychelles ===
- 1798 – 1802 War of the Second Coalition
- 1939 – 1945 World War II
  - 1940 – 1945 Indian Ocean campaign
- 1977 1977 Seychelles coup d'état
- 1981 1981 Seychelles coup attempt

=== Somalia ===
==== Sultanate of Mogadishu ====
- 766 – 837 Abbasid expeditions to East Africa

==== Adal Sultanate ====
- 1424 – 1429 Campaigns of Jamal ad-Din II
- 1500 – 1509 Portuguese conquest of the East African coast
- 1499 – 1543 Somali–Portuguese conflicts
  - 1507 Battle of Barawa
  - 1517 Battle of Zeila
  - 1542 Battle of Benadir
- 1520 – 1526 Adalite Civil War
- 1529 – 1543 Ethiopian–Adal War

==== Isaaq Sultanate ====
- 1825 – 1886 Anglo-Isaaq conflicts
  - 1827 British attack on Berbera (1827)
  - 1855 – 1856 Blockade of Berbera (1855–1856)

==== Emirate of Harar ====
- 1874 – 1885 Egyptian invasion of Harar

==== British Somaliland ====
- 1896 – 1920 Somaliland campaign
- 1922 1922 Burao tax revolt
- 1945 1945 Sheikh Bashir rebellion

==== Italian East Africa ====
- 1939 – 1945 World War II
  - 1940 – 1945 Mediterranean and Middle East theatre of World War II
    - 1940 – 1941 East African campaign (World War II)

==== Somali Republic ====
- 1961 1961 revolt in Somalia
- 1954 1964 Ethiopian–Somali Border War
- 1969 1969 Somali coup d'état

==== Somali Democratic Republic ====
- 1977 – 1978 Ogaden War
  - 1977 Somali invasion of Ogaden
- 1978 1978 Somali coup attempt
- 1978 – 1991 Somali Rebellion
  - 1978 – 1982 Afraad Rebellion
  - 1981 – 1991 Somaliland War of Independence
- 1982 1982 Ethiopian–Somali Border War

==== Federal Republic of Somalia ====
- 1991 – present Somali Civil War
  - 1992 – 1993 Unified Task Force
  - 1993 – 1995 United Nations Operation in Somalia II
  - 1995 – 2006 Consolidation of states within Somalia (1995–2006)
  - 1998 – present Puntland-Somaliland dispute
  - 2000 – present Piracy off the coast of Somalia
    - 2008 – present Operation Atalanta
    - 2009 – present Operation Ocean Shield
  - 2002 – 2016 Operation Enduring Freedom – Horn of Africa
  - 2006 Rise of the Islamic Courts Union
  - 2006 – 2009 Somalia War (2006–2009)
  - 2009 – present Somali Civil War (2009–present)
  - 2023 – present Las Anod conflict (2023–present)
  - 2024 – present Constitutional crisis in Somalia
    - 2024 – present Jubaland crisis

=== South Sudan ===
- 1881 – 1899 Mahdist War
- 1898 Fashoda Incident
- 1955 – 1972 First Sudanese Civil War
- 1960 – 1965 Congo Crisis
  - 1963 – 1965 Simba rebellion
- 1983 – 2005 Second Sudanese Civil War
- 1987 – present Lord's Resistance Army insurgency
- 1996 – 1997 First Congo War
- 2005 – 2006 Disarmament of the Lou Nuer
- 2006 Battle of Malakal
- 2008 – present Sudanese nomadic conflicts
- 2010 – 2011 George Athor's rebellion
- 2008 – present Sudanese nomadic conflicts
  - 2009 2009 Sobat River ambush
  - 2011 – present Ethnic violence in South Sudan (2011–present)
- 2011 – 2020 Sudanese conflict in South Kordofan and Blue Nile
- 2012 Heglig Crisis
- 2013 – 2020 South Sudanese Civil War
- 2022 – present Abyei border conflict (2022–present)
- 2025 2025 Nasir clashes
- 2025 – present Jonglei clashes (2025–present)

=== Tanzania ===
- 1500 – 1509 Portuguese conquest of the East African coast
- 1505 Sack of Kilwa
- 1784 Oman–Zanzibar war
- 1888 – 1889 Abushiri revolt
- 1888 – 1889 Blockade of Zanzibar
- 1896 Anglo-Zanzibar War
- 1905 – 1907 Maji Maji Rebellion
- 1914 – 1918 World War I
  - 1914 – 1918 African theatre of World War I
    - 1914 – 1918 East African Campaign (World War I)
- 1964 Zanzibar Revolution
- 1978 – 1979 Uganda–Tanzania War
- 2017 – present Insurgency in Cabo Delgado

=== Uganda ===
- 1881 – 1899 Mahdist War
- 1892 Battle of Kampala Hill
- 1914 – 1918 World War I
  - 1914 – 1918 African theatre of World War I
    - 1914 – 1918 East African Campaign (World War I)
- 1960 – 1965 Congo Crisis
  - 1963 – 1965 Simba rebellion
- 1966 Mengo Crisis
- 1971 1971 Ugandan coup d'état
- 1972 1972 invasion of Uganda
- 1974 Arube uprising
- 1976 Operation Entebbe
- 1977 Operation Mafuta Mingi
- 1977 1977 invasion of Uganda
- 1978 – 1979 Uganda-Tanzania War
- 1980 – 1986 Ugandan Bush War
- 1986 – 1994 War in Uganda (1986–1994)
- 1987 – 1990 Kenyan-Ugandan border conflict
- 1987 – present Lord's Resistance Army insurgency
- 1996 – present Allied Democratic Forces insurgency
- 1996 – 2002 UNRF II insurgency
- 2016 Kasese clashes

=== Zambia ===
- 1964 – 1979 Rhodesian Bush War
- 1966 – 1990 South African Border War
- 1990 1990 Zambian coup attempt
- 1997 1997 Zambian coup attempt

=== Zimbabwe ===
- 16th century – 20th century Zimbabwean–Portuguese conflicts
- 1893 – 1894 First Matabele War
- 1896 – 1897 Second Matabele War
- 1964 – 1979 Rhodesian Bush War
- 1980 1980 Entumbane clashes
- 1981 1981 Entumbane uprising
- 2017 2017 Zimbabwean coup d'état

== Central Africa ==
=== Angola ===
- 1580 – 1582 Cuanza River Campaign
- 1598 – 1663 Dutch–Portuguese War
- 1622 Battle of Mbumbi
- 1523 Battle of Mbanda Kasi
- 1665 – 1709 Kongo Civil War
- 1671 Battle of Pungo Andongo
- 1681 Battle of Katole
- 1685 Battle of Talandongo
- 1691 – 1693 Mbwila Rebellion of 1691–1693
- 1723 Cabinda Expedition
- 1774 – 1778 Portuguese–Ovimbundu War
- 1902 – 1904 Bailundo revolt
- 1907 Battle of Mufilo
- 1914 – 1918 World War I
  - 1914 – 1918 African theatre of World War I
    - 1914 – 1915 South West Africa campaign
      - 1914 – 1917 Ovambo Uprising
- 1961 – 1974 Portuguese Colonial War
  - 1961 – 1974 Angolan War of Independence
- 1964 – 1979 Rhodesian Bush War
- 1966 – 1990 South African Border War
- 1975 – present Cabinda War
- 1975 – 2002 Angolan Civil War

=== Cameroon ===
- 1804 – 1808 Jihad of Usman dan Fodio
- 1914 – 1918 World War I
  - 1914 – 1918 African theatre of World War I
    - 1914 – 1916 Kamerun campaign
- 1939 – 1945 World War II
- 1955 – 1964 Cameroon War
- 1981 – present Bakassi conflict
  - 1981 – 2005 Nigerian-Cameroonian conflict over Bakassi
  - 2006 – 2018 First Bakassi insurgency
  - 2021 – present Pro-Biafran insurgency in Bakassi
- 1984 1984 Cameroonian coup attempt
- 2007 – present Operation Juniper Shield
- 2009 – present Boko Haram insurgency
- 2017 – present Anglophone Crisis

=== Central African Republic ===
- 1900 Battle of Kousséri
- 1928 – 1931 Kongo-Wara rebellion
- 1965 – 1966 Saint-Sylvestre coup d'état
- 1979 1979 Central African coup d'état
- 1979 – 1981 Operation Barracuda
- 1981 1981 Central African Republic coup d'état
- 1982 1982 Central African Republic coup attempt
- 1987 – present Lord's Resistance Army insurgency
- 2001 2001 Central African Republic coup attempt
- 2002 2002 Central African Republic coup attempt
- 2003 2003 Central African Republic coup d'état
- 2004 – 2007 Central African Republic Bush War
- 2012 – present Central African Republic Civil War (2012–present)
  - 2013 – 2014 Central African Republic conflict under the Djotodia administration

=== Chad ===
- 1898 – 1900 Voulet–Chanoine Mission
- 1899 Battle of Kouno
- 1899 Battle of Togbao
- 1909 – 1911 Ouaddai War
- 1914 – 1918 World War I
  - 1914 – 1918 African theatre of World War I
    - 1914 – 1916 Kamerun campaign
- 1965 – 1979 Chadian Civil War (1965–1979)
- 1978 – 1987 Chadian–Libyan conflict
  - 1986 – 1987 Toyota War
- 1983 Chadian–Nigerian War
- 1990 1990 Chadian coup d'état
- 2002 – present Insurgency in the Maghreb (2002–present)
  - 2007 – present Operation Juniper Shield
- 2004 2004 Chadian coup attempt
- 2005 – 2010 Chadian Civil War (2005–2010)
- 2004 2004 Chadian coup attempt
- 2006 2006 Chadian coup attempt
- 2009 – present Boko Haram insurgency
  - 2015 2015 West African offensive
  - 2018 – 2020 Chad Basin campaign (2018–2020)
- 2013 2013 Chadian coup attempt
- 2016 – present Insurgency in Chad (2016–present)
  - 2021 2021 Northern Chad offensive

=== Republic of Congo ===
- 1665 – 1709 Kongo Civil War
- 1966 1966 Republic of the Congo coup attempt
- 1968 1968 Republic of the Congo coup d'état
- 1972 1972 Republic of the Congo coup attempt
- 1987 1987 Republic of the Congo coup attempt
- 1993 – 1994 Republic of the Congo Civil War (1993–94)
- 1997 – 1999 Republic of the Congo Civil War (1997–1999)
- 2002 – 2003 2002–2003 conflict in the Pool Department
- 2016 – 2017 Pool War

=== Democratic Republic of Congo ===
- 1622 – Kongo-Portuguese War
- 1665 – 1709 Kongo Civil War
- 1891 − 1892 Stairs Expedition to Katanga
- 1892 – 1894 Congo–Arab war
- 1895 – 1908 Batetela rebellion
- 1914 – 1918 World War I
  - 1914 – 1918 African theatre of World War I
    - 1914 – 1918 East African campaign (World War I)
- 1931 Pende revolt
- 1939 – 1945 World War II
  - 1944 Kitawalist uprising
- 1960 – 1965 Congo Crisis
  - 1963 – 1965 Kwilu rebellion
  - 1963 – 1965 Simba Rebellion
  - 1963 – 1966 Kanyarwanda War
- 1963 – present Katanga insurgency
- 1966 – 1967 Stanleyville mutinies
- 1977 Shaba I
- 1978 Shaba II
- 1987 — present Lord's Resistance Army insurgency
- 1996 — present Allied Democratic Forces insurgency
- 1996 – 1997 First Congo War
- 1998 – 2003 Second Congo War
  - 2000 Six-Day War (2000)
- 1999 – present Ituri conflict
- 2004 – present Kivu conflict
  - 2012 – 2013 M23 rebellion (2012–2013)
  - 2022 – present M23 offensive (2022–present)
  - 2022 – 2025 Democratic Republic of the Congo–Rwanda conflict (2022–present)
- 2004 2004 Democratic Republic of the Congo coup attempt
- 2009 Dongo conflict
- 2011 2011 Democratic Republic of the Congo coup attempt
- 2012 2012 Congolese–Rwandan border clash
- 2013 – 2018 Batwa-Luba clashes
- 2013 December 2013 Kinshasa attacks
- 2016 – 2019 Kamwina Nsapu rebellion
- 2022 2022 Democratic Republic of the Congo coup d'état allegations
- 2022 – present Western DR Congo clashes
- 2024 2024 Democratic Republic of the Congo coup attempt

=== Equatorial Guinea ===
- 1936 – 1939 Spanish Civil War
- 1979 1979 Equatorial Guinea coup d'état
- 2004 2004 Equatorial Guinea coup attempt
- 2017 2017 Equatorial Guinea coup attempt

=== Gabon ===
- 1914 – 1918 World War I
  - 1914 – 1918 African theatre of World War I
    - 1914 – 1916 Kamerun campaign
- 1939 – 1945 World War II
  - 1940 Battle of Gabon
- 1964 1964 Gabonese coup d'état
- 2019 2019 Gabonese coup attempt
- 2023 2023 Gabonese coup d'état

=== São Tomé and Príncipe ===
- 1953 Batepá Massacre
- 1988 1988 São Tomé and Príncipe coup attempt
- 1995 1995 São Tomé and Príncipe coup attempt
- 2003 2003 São Tomé and Príncipe coup attempt
- 2022 2022 São Tomé and Príncipe coup attempt

== Southern Africa ==
=== Botswana ===
- 1852 Battle of Dimawe
- 1899 – 1902 Second Boer War
- 1964 – 1979 Rhodesian Bush War
- 1985 Raid on Gaborone

=== Eswatini ===
- 1899 – 1902 Second Boer War

=== Lesotho ===
- 1852 Battle of Berea
- 1858 − 1868 Free State–Basotho Wars
- 1880 – 1881 Basotho Gun War
- 1899 – 1902 Second Boer War
- 1970 1970 Lesotho coup d'état
- 1974 – 1990 BCP Insurgency
- 1986 1986 Lesotho coup d'état
- 1991 1991 Lesotho coup d'état
- 1994 1994 Lesotho coup d'état
- 1998 South African intervention in Lesotho
- 2014 2014 Lesotho political crisis

=== Namibia ===
- 1896 Khaua-Mbandjeru rebellion
- 1904 – 1908 Herero Wars
- 1914 – 1918 World War I
  - 1914 – 1918 African theatre of World War I
    - 1914 – 1915 South West Africa campaign
- 1922 Bondelswarts Rebellion
- 1966 – 1990 South African Border War
- 1994 – 1999 Caprivi conflict

=== South Africa ===
- 1510 Battle of Salt River
- 1659 – 1677 Khoikhoi–Dutch Wars
- 1779 – 1879 Xhosa Wars
- 1792 – 1802 French Revolutionary Wars
  - 1792 – 1797 War of the First Coalition
    - 1793 – 1801 East Indies theatre of the French Revolutionary Wars
- 1803 – 1815 Napoleonic Wars
  - 1805 – 1806 War of the Third Coalition
- 1815 – 1840 Mfecane
  - 1817 – 1819 Ndwandwe–Zulu War
  - 1820 Battle of Mhlatuze River
- 1815 Slachter's Nek Rebellion
- 1830s – 1840s Great Trek
  - 1836 Battle of Vegkop
  - 1838 Piet Retief Delegation massacre
  - 1838 Weenen massacre
  - 1838 Battle of Italeni
  - 1838 Battle of Blood River
  - 1840 Battle of Maqongqo
  - 1842 Battle of Congella
  - 1848 Battle of Boomplaats
- 1862 – 1864 Transvaal Civil War
- 1879 Anglo-Zulu War
- 1880 – 1881 First Boer War
- 1894 Malaboch War
- 1895 – 1896 Jameson Raid
- 1899 – 1902 Second Boer War
- 1906 Bambatha Rebellion
- 1914 – 1918 World War I
  - 1914 – 1918 African theatre of World War I
    - 1914 – 1915 South West Africa campaign
      - 1914 – 1915 Maritz Rebellion
- 1921 – 1922 Rand Rebellion
- 1939 – 1945 World War II
- 1948 – 1994 Internal resistance to apartheid
  - 1950 Witzieshoek revolt
  - 1976 Soweto uprising
  - 1984 – 1986 Vaal uprising
  - 1986 – 1987 Ciskei–Transkei conflict
  - 1987 1987 Transkei coup d'état
  - 1990 1990 Ciskei coup d'état
  - 1990 1990 Venda coup d'état
  - 1991 Battle of Ventersdorp
  - 1994 1994 Bophuthatswana crisis
- 1966 – 1990 South African Border War

== West Africa ==
=== Benin ===
- 1890 First Franco-Dahomean War
- 1892 – 1894 Second Franco-Dahomean War
- 1963 1963 Dahomeyan coup d'état
- 1972 1972 Dahomeyan coup d'état
- 1977 1977 Benin coup attempt
- 2011 – present War in the Sahel
  - 2012 – present Mali War
    - 2015 – present Islamist insurgency in Burkina Faso
      - 2018 – present Fulani-Mossi conflict
  - 2021 – present Jihadist insurgency in Northern Benin
- 2025 2025 Beninese coup attempt

=== Burkina Faso ===
- 1914 – 1918 World War I
  - 1914 – 1918 African theatre of World War I
    - 1915 – 1916 North African theatre of World War I
      - 1915 – 1917 Volta-Bani War
- 1966 1966 Upper Voltan coup d'état
- 1974 1974 Upper Voltan coup d'état
- 1980 1980 Upper Voltan coup d'état
- 1982 1982 Upper Voltan coup d'état
- 1983 1983 Upper Voltan coup attempt
- 1983 1983 Upper Voltan coup d'état
- 1985 Agacher Strip War
- 1987 1987 Burkina Faso coup d'état
- 1989 1989 Burkina Faso coup attempt
- 2007 – present Operation Juniper Shield
  - 2011 – present Islamist insurgency in the Sahel
    - 2012 – present Mali War
      - 2014 – 2022 Operation Barkhane
      - 2015 – present Jihadist insurgency in Burkina Faso
        - 2018 – present Fulani-Mossi conflict
    - 2019 – present JNIM–ISGS war
- 2015 2015 Burkina Faso coup attempt
- 2016 2016 Burkina Faso coup attempt
- 2022 January 2022 Burkina Faso coup d'état
- 2022 September 2022 Burkina Faso coup d'état
- 2023 2023 Burkina Faso coup attempt

=== Cape Verde ===
- 1585 – 1604 Anglo-Spanish War (1585–1604)
- 1619 Action of 19 February 1619
- 1701 – 1714 War of the Spanish Succession
- 1775 – 1783 American Revolutionary War

=== Côte d'Ivoire ===
- 1819 – 1861 African Slave Trade Patrol
  - 1842 Mary Carver Affair
  - 1842 Ivory Coast expedition
- 1883 – 1898 Mandingo Wars
- 1999 – 2003 Second Liberian Civil War
- 1999 1999 Ivorian coup d'état
- 2001 2001 Ivorian coup attempt
- 2002 – 2007 First Ivorian Civil War
  - 2004 2004 French–Ivorian clashes
- 2010 – 2011 Second Ivorian Civil War
- 2011 – present Islamist insurgency in the Sahel
- 2012 2012 Ivorian coup attempt
- 2017 2017 Ivory Coast mutinies

=== Gambia ===
- 1830 – 1887 Soninke–Marabout wars
  - 1850 – 1856 Soninke–Marabout war (Kombo)
- 1831 – 1832 Barra War
- 1981 1981 Gambian coup attempt
- 1994 1994 Gambian coup d'état
- 2014 2014 Gambian coup attempt
- 2016 – 2017 2016–2017 Gambian constitutional crisis
- 2017 – present ECOWAS military intervention in the Gambia
- 2022 2022 Gambian coup attempt

=== Ghana ===
- 1598 – 1663 Dutch–Portuguese War
- 1652 – 1784 Anglo-Dutch Wars
  - 1661 – 1665 Dano-Dutch colonial conflict on the Gold Coast
  - 1664 – 1665 De Ruyter's expedition to West Africa
  - 1780 – 1784 Fourth Anglo-Dutch War
    - 1781 Shirley's Gold Coast expedition
- 1678 Assault on Osu
- 1694 – 1700 Komenda Wars
- 1701 Battle of Feyiase
- 1784 Sagbadre War
- 1806 – 1807 Ashanti–Fante War
- 1811 Ga–Fante War
- 1814 – 1816 Ashanti–Akim–Akwapim War
- 1823 – 1900 Anglo-Ashanti wars
  - 1826 Katamanso War
  - 1900 War of the Golden Stool
- 1837 – 1839 Dutch–Ahanta War
- 1869 – 1870 Dutch Gold Coast expedition of 1869–1870
- 1892 1892 Sack of Salaga
- 1896 Battle of Adibo
- 1897 Battle of Kanjaga
- 1901 Kumasi Mutiny of 1901
- 1957 – present Bawku conflict
- 1966 1966 Ghanaian coup d'état
- 1967 Operation Guitar Boy
- 1979 June 4th revolution in Ghana
- 1981 1981 Ghanaian coup d'état
- 1994 – 2015 Konkomba–Nanumba conflict
- 2002 2002 Dagbon chieftaincy crisis
- 2019 – present Gonja-Mamprusi conflict
- 2020 – present Western Togoland Rebellion

=== Guinea ===
- 1803 – 1815 Napoleonic Wars
  - 1813 Action of 7 February 1813
- 1960 Operation Persil
- 1963 – 1974 Guinea-Bissau War of Independence
- 1984 1984 Guinean coup d'état
- 1996 1996 Guinean coup attempt
- 1999 – 2003 Second Liberian Civil War
  - 2000 – 2001 RFDG Insurgency
- 2008 2008 Guinean military unrest
- 2013 2013 Guinea clashes
- 2021 2021 Guinean coup d'état

=== Guinea-Bissau ===
- 1961 – 1974 Portuguese Colonial War
  - 1963 – 1974 Guinea-Bissau War of Independence
- 1980 1980 Guinea-Bissau coup d'état
- 1998 1998 Guinea-Bissau coup attempt
- 1998 – 1999 Guinea-Bissau Civil War
- 2003 2003 Guinea-Bissau coup d'état
- 2010 2010 Guinea-Bissau military unrest
- 2011 2011 Guinea-Bissau coup attempt
- 2012 2012 Guinea-Bissau coup d'état
- 2022 2022 Guinea-Bissau coup attempt
- 2023 2023 Guinea-Bissau coup attempt
- 2025 2025 Guinea-Bissau coup d'état

=== Liberia ===
- 1835 Port Cresson massacre
- 1871 1871 Liberian coup d'état
- 1875 – 1876 Liberian–Grebo War
- 1914 – 1918 World War I
  - 1914 – 1918 African theatre of World War I
- 1980 1980 Liberian coup d'état
- 1985 1985 Liberian coup attempt
- 1994 1994 Liberian coup attempt
- 1989 – 1996 First Liberian Civil War
- 1998 1998 Monrovia clashes
- 1999 – 2003 Second Liberian Civil War

=== Mali ===
- 1235 Battle of Kirina
- 1590 – 1599 Moroccan invasion of the Songhai Empire
  - 1591 Battle of Tondibi
- 1599 Battle of Jenné
- 1857 Siege of Medina Fort
- 1861 Battle of Segou
- 1862 Battle of Cayawal
- 1883 – 1886 Mandingo Wars
- 1891 First Battle of Jenné
- 1893 Second Battle of Jenné
- 1962 – 1964 Tuareg rebellion (1962–64)
- 1968 1968 Malian coup d'état
- 1985 Agacher Strip War
- 1990 – 1995 Tuareg rebellion (1990–95)
- 1991 1991 Malian coup d'état
- 2002 – present Insurgency in the Maghreb (2002–present)
  - 2007 – present Operation Juniper Shield
  - 2011 – present Islamist insurgency in the Sahel
    - 2012 – present Mali War
      - 2012 2012 Tuareg rebellion
      - 2012 2012 Malian coup d'état
      - 2012 2012 Malian counter-coup attempt
      - 2013 – 2014 Operation Serval
      - 2013 Chadian intervention in northern Mali
      - 2014 – 2022 Operation Barkhane
      - 2019 – present JNIM–ISGS war
      - 2020 2020 Malian coup d'état
      - 2021 2021 Malian coup d'état
- 2006 2006 Tuareg rebellion
- 2007 – 2009 Tuareg rebellion (2007–2009)

=== Mauritania ===
- 740 – 743 Berber Revolt
- 1056 Battle of Tabfarilla
- 1970 – present Western Sahara conflict
  - 1975 – 1991 Western Sahara War
- 1978 1978 Mauritanian coup d'état
- 1979 1979 Mauritanian coup d'état
- 1980 1980 Mauritanian coup d'état
- 1981 1981 Mauritanian coup attempt
- 1984 1984 Mauritanian coup d'état
- 1989 – 1991 Mauritania–Senegal Border War
- 2002 – present Insurgency in the Maghreb (2002–present)
  - 2011 – present War in the Sahel
    - 2014 — 2022 Operation Barkhane
- 2003 2003 Mauritanian coup attempt
- 2005 2005 Mauritanian coup d'état
- 2008 2008 Mauritanian coup d'état

=== Niger ===
- 1516 – 1517 Songhai Civil War
- 1914 – 1918 World War I
  - 1916 – 1917 Kaocen Revolt
- 1974 1974 Nigerien coup d'état
- 1990 – 1995 Tuareg rebellion (1990–95)
- 1996 1996 Nigerien coup d'état
- 1999 1999 Nigerien coup d'état
- 2002 – present Insurgency in the Maghreb (2002–present)
  - 2007 – present Operation Juniper Shield
    - 2007 – 2009 Tuareg rebellion (2007–09)
  - 2009 – present Boko Haram insurgency
  - 2011 – present Islamist insurgency in the Sahel
    - 2012 – present Mali War
      - 2014 — 2022 Operation Barkhane
      - 2015 – present Jihadist insurgency in Niger
    - 2015 – present Jihadist insurgency in Burkina Faso
      - 2018 – present Fulani-Mossi conflict
    - 2019 – present JNIM–ISGS war
- 2010 2010 Nigerien coup d'état
- 2011 2011 Nigerien coup attempt
- 2021 2021 Nigerien coup attempt
- 2023 2023 Nigerien coup d'état
- 2023 – 2024 Nigerien crisis (2023–2024)
- 2026 2026 Nigerien coup attempt

=== Nigeria ===
- 1789 – 1893 Yoruba Wars
  - 1800s Mugbamugba War
  - 1835 – 1849 Ife-Modakeke conflict
  - 1877 – 1893 Kiriji War
- 1804 – 1808 Fulani War
- 1835 – 1836 Fula jihads
- 1897 Benin Expedition of 1897
- 1901 – 1902 Anglo-Aro War
- 1915 Bussa rebellion
- 1918 Adubi War
- 1966 1966 Nigerian coup d'état
- 1966 1966 Nigerian counter-coup
- 1967 – 1970 Nigerian Civil War
- 1968 – 1969 Agbekoya
- 1975 1975 Nigerian coup d'état
- 1976 1976 Nigerian coup attempt
- 1983 Chadian–Nigerian War
- 1983 1983 Nigerian coup d'état
- 1985 1985 Nigerian coup d'état
- 1990 1990 Nigerian coup attempt
- 1993 1993 Nigerian coup d'état
- 1997 – 2003 Warri Crisis
- 1998 – present Communal conflicts in Nigeria
  - 1953 – present Religious violence in Nigeria
  - 1998 – present Herder–farmer conflicts in Nigeria
    - 2011 – present Nigerian bandit conflict
- 2003 – present Conflict in the Niger Delta
  - 2016 – present 2016 Niger Delta conflict
  - 2021 – present Insurgency in Southeastern Nigeria
- 2007 – ongoing Operation Juniper Shield
  - 2009 – present Boko Haram insurgency
    - 2009 2009 Boko Haram uprising
  - 2011 – present Islamist insurgency in the Sahel
- 2010 2010 Nigerien coup d'état
- 2014 2014 Enugu Government House attack
- 2014 2014 Enugu State Broadcasting Service attack
- 2024 Oyo State coup attempt

=== Saint Helena, Ascension and Tristan da Cunha ===
- 1652 – 1784 Anglo–Dutch wars
  - 1672 – 1674 Third Anglo-Dutch War

=== Senegal ===
- 1549 Battle of Danki
- 1619 Ambush at Portudal
- 1659 – late 1800s French conquest of Senegal
  - 1825 Franco-Trarzan War of 1825
  - 1859 Battle of Logandème
- 1756 – 1763 Seven Years' War
  - 1758 British capture of Senegal
- 1644 – 1677 Char Bouba war
- 1830 – 1887 Soninke–Marabout wars
- 1939 – 1945 World War II
  - 1940 Battle of Dakar
- 1982 – present Casamance conflict
- 1989 – 1991 Mauritania–Senegal Border War
- 2007 – present Operation Juniper Shield

=== Sierra Leone ===
- 1967 1967 Sierra Leonean coups d'état
- 1968 Sergeant's Coup
- 1982 Ndogboyosoi War
- 1991 – 2002 Sierra Leone Civil War
  - 1992 1992 Sierra Leonean coup d'état
- 2023 2023 Sierra Leone coup attempt

=== Togo ===
- 1764 Battle of Atakpamé
- 1914 – 1918 World War I
  - 1914 – 1918 African theatre of World War I
    - 1914 Togoland campaign
- 1963 1963 Togolese coup d'état
- 1967 1967 Togolese coup d'état
- 1986 1986 Togolese coup attempt
- 2005 2005 Togolese coup d'état

== See also ==
- List of conflicts in North America
- List of conflicts in Central America
- List of conflicts in South America
- List of conflicts in Europe
- List of conflicts in Asia
- List of conflicts in the Near East
- List of conflicts in the Middle East
- List of conflicts in Australia
- List of wars
