= Chadian coup d'état =

Chadian coup d'état may refer to:

- 2013 Chadian coup d'état attempt
- 2006 Chadian coup d'état attempt
- 2004 Chadian coup d'état attempt
- 1990 Chadian coup d'état
- 1975 Chadian coup d'état
