= Battle of Cairo =

Battle of Cairo may refer to:

- 2011 Egyptian revolution
- Battle of Cairo (1367)
- Capture of Cairo (1517)
- Revolt of Cairo in 1798
- Siege of Cairo in 1801
