= Battle of Essien (1957) =

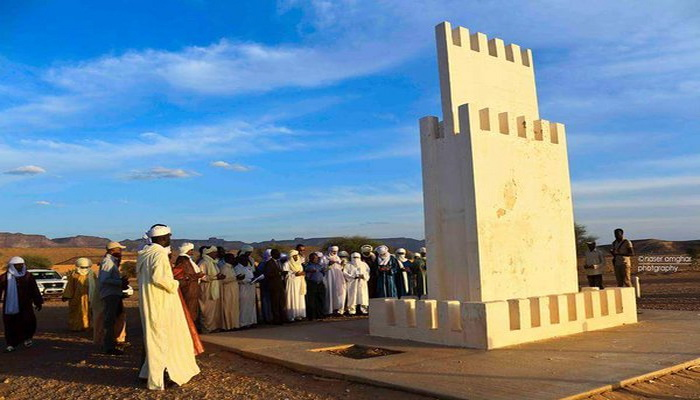
- Monument built in commemoration of the Battle
Date	3–4 October 1957
Location	Algeria-Libya border
Result	Algerian-Libyan victory
Territorial changes	French forces withdraw from the region

Belligerents
Libya (Algeria) FLN	France

Strength
(Libya) Unknown (Algeria) Unknown	(France) 80 soldiers (France) 3 armored vehicles (France) 2 aircraft

Casualties and losses
(Libya) Unknown (Algeria) Unknown	(France) 12 killed (France) 1 tank destroyed (France) 1 plane destroyed

The Battle of Essien, also known as the Battle of Isin, took place in October 1957, in the village of Essien, located south of the Libyan town of Ghat. This significant engagement emerged from the complex dynamics of the Algerian War of Independence against French colonial rule.

== Background ==
During the French colonial empire's last days, Algerians had launched a rebellion against the French, with the means of seeking independence. The French had an unsteady relationship with not just the Algerian resistance, but also the neighbouring countries that bordered French Algeria.

Franco-Libyan relations were quite unsteady. In November 1954, Bin Halim had assisted a delivery of supplies from Egypt to the Algerian resistance. Fezzan had then become the main supply route for the Algerian resistance.

== The battle ==
An ambush was orchestrated by Algerian Mujahideen on a French supply convoy near the Algeria–Libya border. Following this incident, the Mujahideen retreated into Libyan territory, prompting the French occupation army to pursue them across the border. The escalation of hostilities led to the bombing of the village of Issin by French forces on October 3, 1957, further exacerbating tensions between Algeria, Libya, and France.

The height of the conflict came on October 4, 1957, as the Libyan army intervened against the French forces, marking the commencement of the Battle of Essien. The French deployed a column consisting of 16 cars and 80 soldiers. Algerian and Libyan revolutionaries intercepted the attack, engaging in fierce resistance against the invading forces. Despite being outnumbered, the Algerian and Libyan fighters were able to defend their position, inflicting casualties on the French forces.

The town was later bombed several times by the French. However, the Libyan and Algerian Mujahideen were able to force the French to withdraw from the region.

== Reactions ==
The French attack was condemned by the Libyan kingdom, and was also condemned by The United Nations Commission of Inquiry, saying that the attack on Libyan soil is unjust.

== Legacy ==
The anniversary of the battle is celebrated every year by Algerian and Libyan diplomats, ambassadors, and other figures. The battle is remembered as a reminder of how they "fought against the common enemy", further solidifying the Algerian–Libyan relations.

Franco-Libyan relations remained very unsteady, and did not begin to improve whatsoever up until Algeria gained its Independence in 1962.
