= Majdouline Cherni =

Tunisian architect and politician

Majdouline Cherni (born 21 February 1981) is a Tunisian architect and politician who was Minister of Youth and Sports from 2016 to 2018.

== Early life and education ==
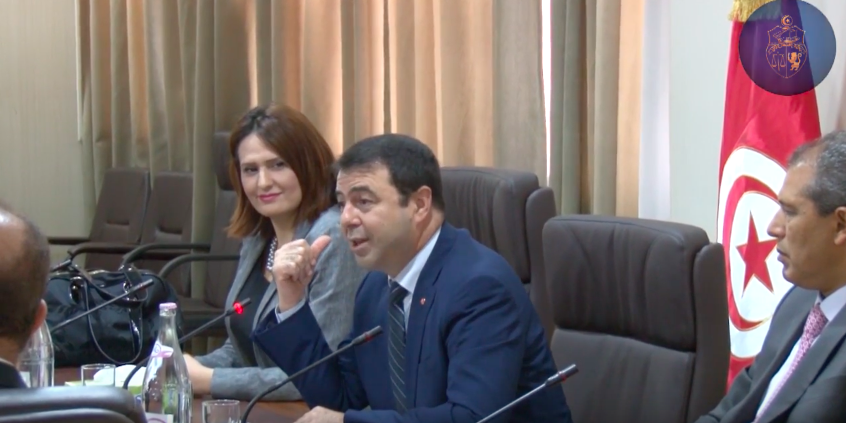
Majdouline Cheri

Cherni was born on 21 February 1981 in Menzel Bourguiba in the Bizerte Governorate. She studied architecture in El Kef.

== Career ==
Cherni worked in vocational training centres and architectural design offices before becoming chair of the Chamber of Businesswoman of Kef and appointed as a delegate to the Manouba Governorate. She was a candidate for the Free Patriotic Union for Kef in the 2011 election.

On 23 January 2015, Cherni was appointed Secretary of State in charge of the Dossier of the Martyrs and Wounded of the Revolution in the cabinet of Habib Essid. Her role included providing "moral and material assistance" to families. On 20 August 2016, she was appointed Minister of Youth and Sports in the cabinet of Youssef Chahed. She has been responsible for organising youth forums to seek to restore the confidence of young people in Tunisia's state institutions. In late 2016, several photos posted on the minister's Facebook page were digitally altered to cover her knees.

She was replaced as Minister of Youth and Sports by Sonia Ben Cheikh in the cabinet reshuffle of November 2018.

== Personal life ==
Cherni's brother Socrate was a lieutenant in the Tunisian National Guard who was killed in the battle of Sidi Ali Ben Aoun on 23 October 2013.
