= Bombardment of Tripoli (1828) =

1828 conflict between the navies of Tripoli and the Kingdom of the Two Sicilies

Coordinates: 32°54′8″N 13°11′9″E

- Part of Tripolitanian-Neapolitan War
Date	23–29 August 1828
Location	Tripoli (present day Libya)
Result	Tripolitanian victory

Belligerents
Kingdom of the Two Sicilies	Ottoman Tripolitania

Commanders and leaders
Baron Alphonso Sosi de Caraffa	Yusuf Karamanli

Strength
1 Ship of the Line; 2 Frigates; 1 Brig; 2 Corvettes; 1 Schooner; 12 gunboats and mortar boats	20 vessels shore batteries

The Bombardment of Tripoli in 1828 was a naval engagement fought between the navies of Tripoli and the Kingdom of the Two Sicilies. After the Pasha of Tripoli demanded money from the Kingdom of Two Sicilies in exchange for peace, the Neapolitan government sent a squadron to Tripoli to refuse the Tripolitanian demands and attempt to coerce the Tripolitanians away from war. Upon receiving the news that the Neapolitans refused the Tripolitanians demands, the Pasha declared war on the Kingdom of the Two Sicilies.

As a result of the Pasha's declaration of war the Neapolitan squadron offshore began a blockade of the coast of Tripoli on 23 August 1828. The Neapolitans attempted to move into the harbor to bombard the city into submission but were forced into an engagement with the Tripolitanian navy and repelled. The next few days saw further unsuccessful attempts by the Neapolitans at bombarding the city and engaging the Tripolitanian fleet. Suffering losses and having made no progress against forcing Tripoli to abandon its demands for payment, the Neapolitan fleet withdrew on 29 August and sailed back to Naples. The war continued on uneventfully to October when through French mediation the Neapolitans finally acquiesced to the Tripolitanian demands.
