= 2004 Chadian coup attempt =

2004 attempt to overthrow President Idriss Déby

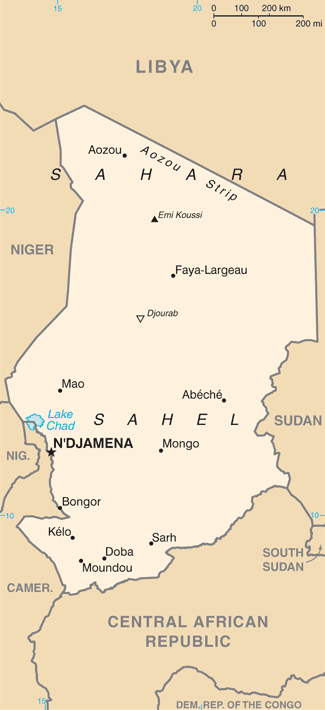
Map of Chad.

The 2004 Chadian coup d'état attempt was an attempted coup d'état against the Chadian President Idriss Déby that was foiled on the night of May 16, 2004.

== Plot ==
The coup attempt was at first presented by the government as a fairly contained military mutiny over pay and conditions of service, with the Information Minister Moktar Wawadajab assuring the BBC that the mutiny had ended without a shot being fired, and that no-one was killed or injured. While the rebellion was rapidly quelled by loyalist forces after a brief exchange of fire, and the about 80 rebels and their ringleader, the army Colonel Bechir Haggar, were arrested, the President later admitted the seriousness of what had happened. In a televised address to the nation on May 18 Déby confirmed that elements of the GNNT and of the Presidential Guard had made an attempt on his life: "A group of fanatic and manipulated officers tried to disrupt the functioning of republican institutions on the night of May 16 ... Their hidden agenda was the assassination of the President."

== Motivations ==
The possible reasons behind the failed coup are judged to be mainly two by observers. The first of these, and the most evident, is linked to the decision by Déby to search a third presidential mandate, modifying the Constitution with the help of the solid majority he could count on in the National Assembly; precisely in the day of the coup the necessary constitutional amendments were being rushed through the Parliament. This generated strong tensions in the inner circles of power, especially among the Zaghawa, Déby's ethnic group; and the coup saw the participation of senior Zaghawa officers, and important political allies of Déby were thought to have been involved, like Daoussa Déby, half-brother of the President, and the Erdimi twins, Tom and Timam, nephews of Déby. The suspicions regarding Daoussa Déby were to prove groundless, while on December 12, 2005 the Erdimi brothers were accused by the government of being the true masterminds behind the failed coup. The two were also to be the key architects in yet another coup d'état attempt that took place in 2006.

Another possible reason may be linked to Déby's foreign policy decisions regarding the Darfur conflict; in the conflict involving the Darfur rebels and the Sudan-supported Janjaweed, at the time Déby was attempting to maintain good relations with Sudan, a choice that made many Senior Chadian officers unhappy, many of whom were reportedly supporting the insurgents logistically, politically and financially. Therefore, this coup attempt is seen as an outcome of the longstanding internal political instability and ethnic divisions exacerbated by Déby’s autocratic governance and the influence of transnational conflicts, particularly the Darfur conflict. Relations with Sudan were to worsen dramatically the following year, leading to the Chadian-Sudanese conflict.

== See also ==
- Chadian coup of 1975
- 2006 Chadian coup d'état attempt
- History of Chad
