= Battle of Zeila (1517) =

- Part of Somali-Portuguese conflicts
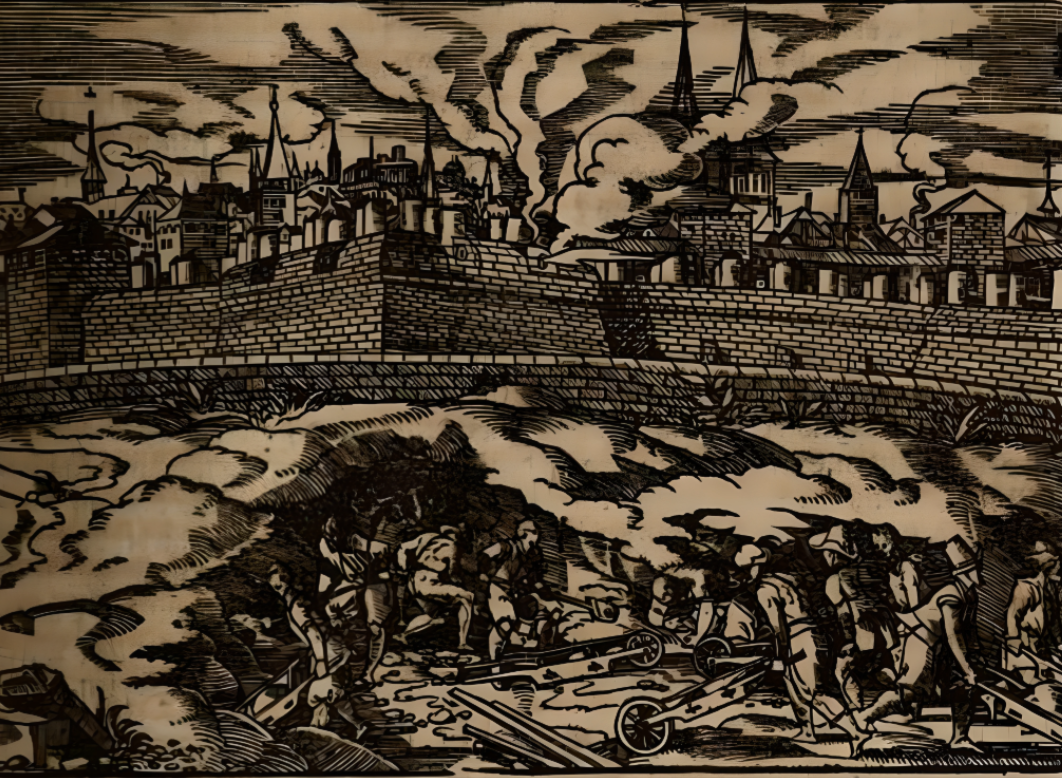
- 16th century engraving depicting the battle
Date	July 1517
Location	Zeila, Adal Sultanate
Result	Portuguese victory

Belligerents
Portuguese Empire	Adal Sultanate

Commanders and leaders
Lopo Soares de Albergaria	Unknown

Strength
34 ships	Unknown

Casualties and losses
Few or none	Unknown

The Battle of Zeila was an armed encounter that took place in the coastal city of Zeila, between the forces of the Adal Sultanate and those of the Portuguese Empire, under the command of the governor of India Lopo Soares de Albergaria. After a brief fight, the Portuguese captured and razed the city.

== Prelude ==
In 1517, the Portuguese governor of India Lopo Soares de Albergaria sailed a large armada to attack Ottoman positions in the Red Sea. Having failed to capture Jeddah, short on water and supplies, the fleet withdrew, having called at Kamaran Island before sailing to Zeila. At the time the Sultanate of Adal was involved with most of its forces in a war with Ethiopia, a Portuguese ally, and Mahfuz the governor of Zeila, had recently been killed. Having been warned that the Portuguese fleet was incoming, the inhabitants evacuated all women and children, and a number of warriors remained behind to defend the city and the ships left behind. They gathered on the beaches to resist a Portuguese landing. Seeing this, Albergaria determined to capture the city and landed a contingent of men. The Portuguese wrote that "The city is of good size and flat, by the edge of the sea. It's made of stone and lime houses with terraced roofs like those of Aden. Its inhabitants are Moors and merchants of great trade and for the most part are black, men as well as children, and some white, and they treat each other well".

== Battle ==
Harassed by cannon-fire and taunted, the Portuguese under the command of Gaspar da Silva, Aires da Silva and António Ferreira Fogaça moved in to assault the city before the governor had landed, and when they realized there were few defenders they occupied it after a brief struggle. Though its governors initially resisted, the city was stormed, some of its inhabitants were killed in the streets, and large sections were set on fire. Among the captives was a Portuguese sailor, João Fernandes of Leça, who revealed that other Portuguese had previously engaged in the illicit sale of weapons to Zeila, a scandal compounded by the fact that these same arms were later used by the Adal Sultanate in war against the Ethiopian emperor (Prester John). In the ensuing campaign, the Sultan of Adal’s captain, Mahfuz of Zeila, challenged the Ethiopians to single combat but was slain by the Franciscan friar Gabriel Andres, whose victory triggered the rout of the Adal army. The triumph was celebrated at the Ethiopian court, commemorated in contemporary ballads, and later reported by Portuguese ambassador D. Rodrigo de Lima and the friar Francisco Alvares in his Itinerário.

== See also ==
- Portuguese India
- Portuguese Socotra
- Siege of Jeddah (1517)
- Battle of al-Shihr (1523)
- Mamluk-Portuguese conflicts
