= Battle of Talandongo =

- Part of Colonization of Angola
Date	February 2, 1583
Location	Near Cambambe, Angola
Result	Portuguese victory

Belligerents
Kingdom of Portugal	Kingdom of Ndongo

Commanders and leaders
Paulo Dias de Novais; Baltasar Barreira; D. Paulo (previously known as Songa)	Ngola

Strength
150 soldiers	1,200 soldiers

Casualties and losses
7 killed	Unknown

The Battle of Talandongo was a military conflict between the Kingdom of Portugal and the Kingdom of Ndongo.

== Background ==
Father Baltasar Barreira, who was in Luanda at the beginning of 1582, found himself once again near Cambambe by January 3, 1583, alongside Governor Paulo Dias de Novais, after having abandoned the camp at Mocumba. It seems he had been accompanying the governor for some time, as he mentions several important local chiefs who had embraced Christianity, resulting in about a thousand baptisms since Songa's baptism. Among the notable chiefs baptized was Quicunguela, now D. Luis, in whose lands the governor was housed. Father Barreira did not hide the strategic purpose behind these baptisms:

A conversão destas pessoas poderosas na terra dá mui grande animo aos Portugueses, e os assegura muito, porque delles recebe os avisos necessarios, e são acopanhados nas guerras, e ajudados co muy grande fidelidade, sẽ o qual não será possivel conservarse esta conquista e augmetar o conquistado, como se poderá coligir do que logo direy.

== Battle ==
After departing from Mocumba, the governor advanced to "Nova Gaza," near the Ngola capital. As the Portuguese approached Cambambe, they fired two shots. The Ngola king, fearing what might happen, fled with his men. The Portuguese mistakenly believed this was a retreat out of fear, but it was actually a strategic move to assemble an army of 1,200 men to confront them. The local chiefs allied with the Portuguese hesitated to fight, except for D. Paulo, who remained loyal.

The battle took place on February 2, 1583. With fewer than 150 Portuguese soldiers and a group of African allies, the Portuguese managed to defeat the larger Ngola force in under two hours. This victory was considered miraculous, attributed in part to Father Barreira's spiritual leadership, as he was viewed as a “Moses Intercessor.” The battle was seen as a holy war. Seven Portuguese soldiers died when Barreira stopped praying, which some blamed on him for the losses.

== Aftermath ==
Later the governor recognized Barreira's role in the victory and rewarded him with land. The governor wrote to the King of Portugal to confirm these donations, aiming to establish a region populated by white settlers that would generate sufficient revenue for three colleges. However, he strategically abandoned Nova Gaza and retreated to a naturally fortified location about half a journey from Cambambe: Massangano, known as the Vila da Vitória.
