= 1835–1858 revolt in Ottoman Tripolitania =

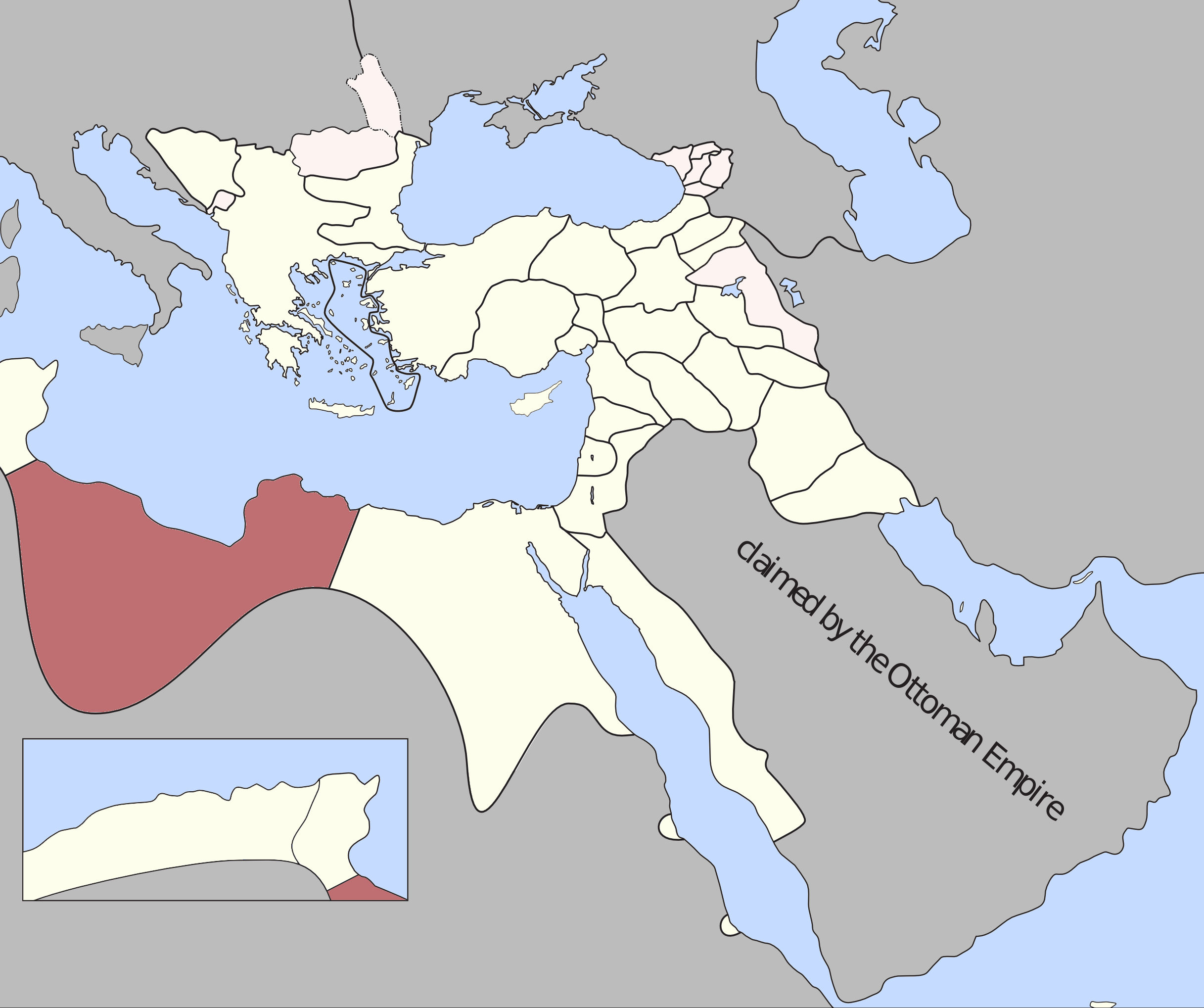
- Map of the Tripolitania Eyalet in 1795.
Date	1835–1858
Location	Ottoman Tripolitania
Result	Ottoman victory

Belligerents
Ottoman Empire	Libyan rebels

The 1835–1858 revolt in Ottoman Tripolitania began at the end of the Karamanli rule, in which tribal leaders such as 'Abd al-Jalil and Ghuma al-Mahmudi revolted against central Ottoman rule, which ended after Ghuma's death in 1858.
