= Portuguese–Mutapa conflicts =

Portuguese—Mutapa conflicts
- Part of Portuguese colonization of Africa
- Portuguese activity in the Zimbabwe plateau, Zambezia and adjacent regions, c. 1500–1700
Date	16th–17th century
Location	Mutapa Empire (modern-day Zimbabwe and Mozambique)
Result	Portuguese victory

Belligerents
Kingdom of Portugal	Mutapa Empire	Mutapa rebel factions

The Portuguese–Mutapa conflicts were a series of military and political confrontations between the Kingdom of Portugal and the Mutapa Empire from the 16th to 17th centuries.

== Background ==
The Portuguese first attempted to reach the gold of Ophir under Pero de Anaia, who led a massacre in a neighboring village but later died of fever.

Later, between 1514 and 1515, António Fernandes undertook expeditions with the same objective. He returned with reports of the goldfields of Matabeleland.

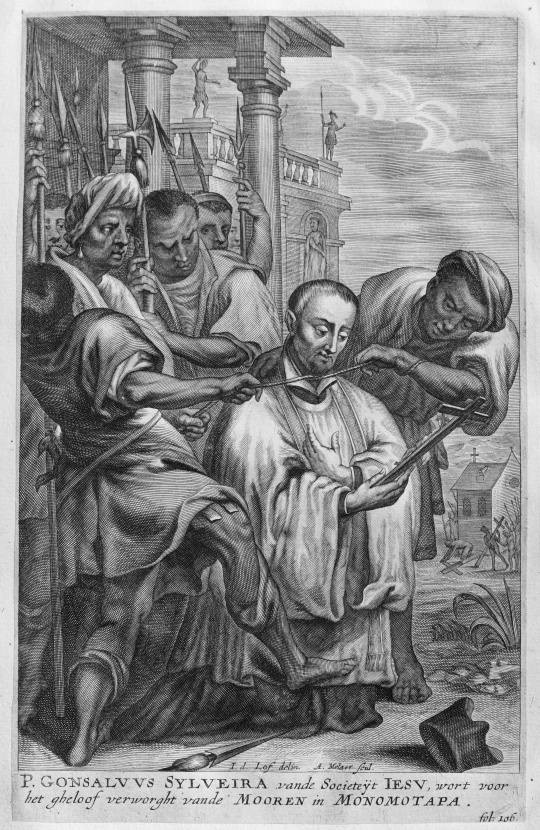
Strangulation of Jesuit Father Gonçalo da Silveira in Mutapa

Another expedition took place fifty years after Anaia's death, led by Francisco Barreto, to avenge the death of Portuguese missionary Gonçalo da Silveira, who was killed in 1561. Barreto, commanding three ships and a thousand men, demanded control of the land around Tete and Sena as compensation.

== Hostilities ==
=== Francisco Barreto's expedition (1569–1573) ===
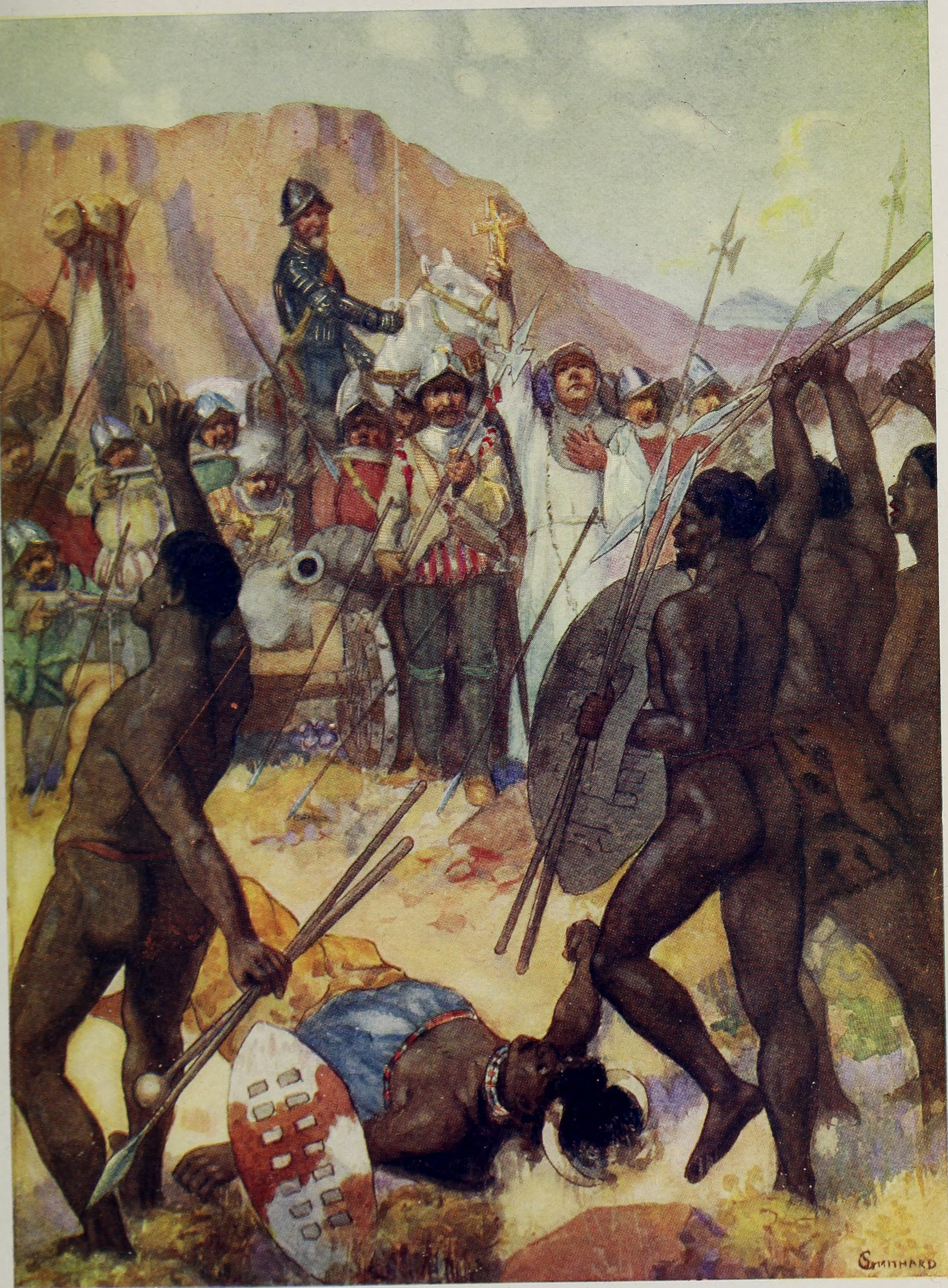
Francisco Barreto and his army fighting the Samungazi

Following the murder of missionary Gonçalo da Silveira by the Mutapan court (specifically attributed to Muslims), in 1569 Francisco Barreto was appointed by King Sebastian to command an expedition to the Mutapa Empire, tasked with imperial conquest and furthering the spread of Christianity. (Note: Sources differ on whether Barreto nominated himself or reluctantly accepted the role.) The king granted 500 soldiers and 100,000 cruzados annually, and Barreto left Portugal with 1000 men and three ships, one of which turned back.

After stopping at Mozambique, in May 1571 Barreto, having travelled up the Zambezi, reached Sena with 700 soldiers, and started construction on a fort. Malaria and the rainy season gravely impacted the group. The Portuguese fought two battles against the Samungazi, a Mutapan vassal, and despite the Samungazi's numerical advantage repelled them with difficulty due to harquebuses and artillery. Despite hearing the Mutapan army numbered nearly 100,000, Barreto wished to continue, and Portuguese ambassadors were received by Mwenemutapa Negomo Chirisamhuru in April 1573. Chirisamhuru said he was pleased to have direct communications with the Portuguese, and regretted the death of Silveira, saying the perpetrators had already been dealt with and Muslims expelled from his court. Chirisamhuru also donated some silver and gold mines as recognition of the Portuguese's long journey. Barreto died shortly afterwards, and the expedition was and is widely regarded as a failure.

=== Mutapa Civil War (1597–1610) ===
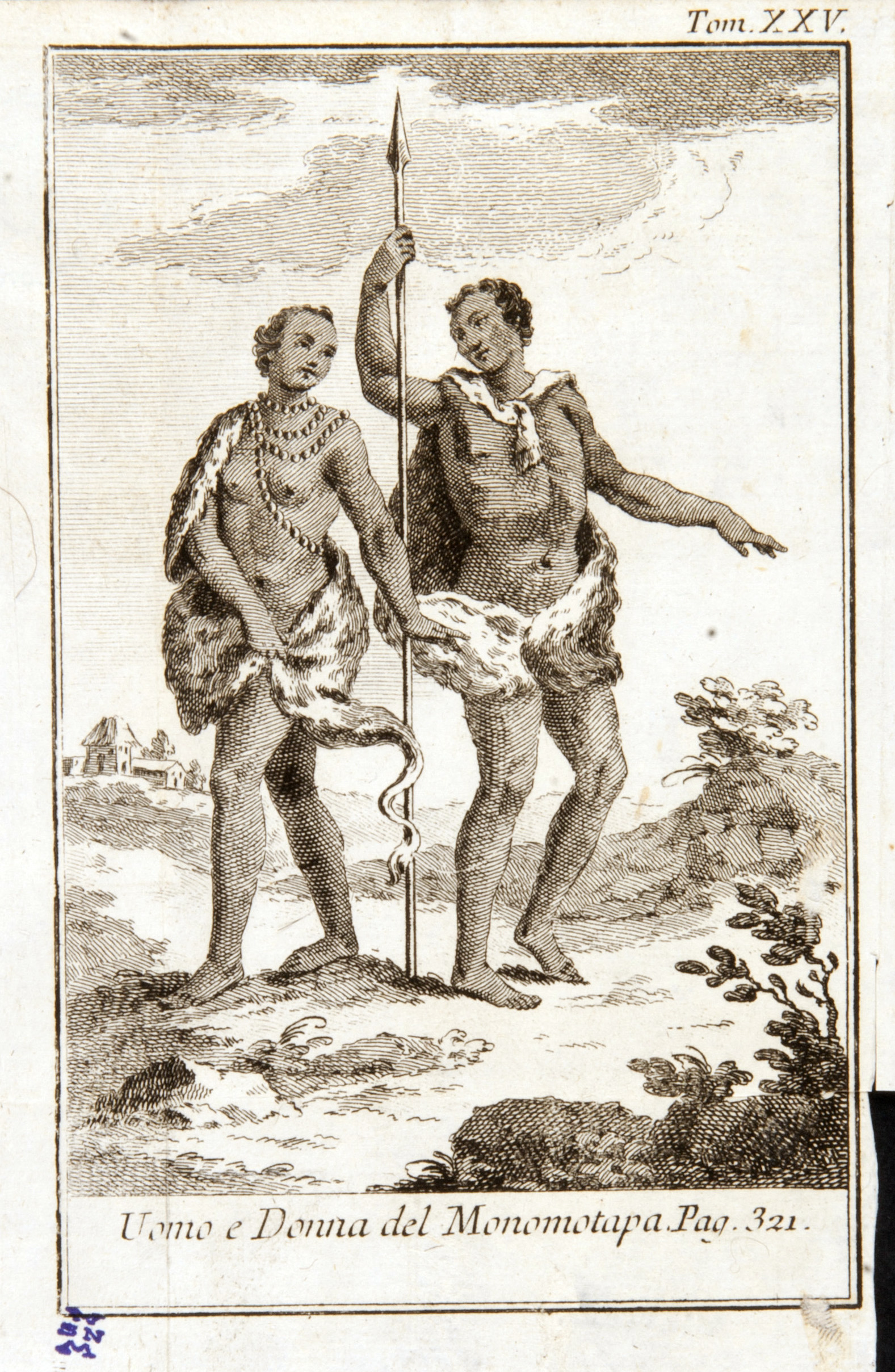
Man and woman of the Monomotapa

In 1597, Chunzo, who lived in the Zambezi Valley, rebelled against Mutapa Gatsi Rusere, plundering gold areas at Chironga and Nhanha and killing a captain general. One of his generals, Chicanda, invaded Mutapa territory and came close to the Motambo River. Though initially pardoned, Chicanda rebelled again around 1599 and attacked Mutapa villages.

This triggered a civil war that temporarily deposed Rusere, causing the Mutapa to seek help from the Portuguese at Tete. Chicanda defended himself by building a wooden fort with loopholes and a ditch on high ground. After the killing of Ningomoxa, another revolt broke out in Antauara, though its leader was killed by a "powerful Kaffir", likely Chunzo. Chunzo was eventually defeated and killed with Portuguese assistance, but his general Matuzianhe reorganized the rebels and continued the war from Matarira Mountain, placing Anconhe, Chirouadanda, and Inhamazino in different regions, including Chizinga.

Seeking support, Rusere surrendered his mines to the Portuguese Crown in 1607. Matuzianhe expanded his conquests toward Tete until checked by Diogo Simões with local assistance. Matuzianhe's revolt ended with his assassination.

Rebel pressure from Chizinga continued, leading the Portuguese to build a stockade at Massapa in 1610. Though raided twice, it was reinforced by Mutapa soldiers. Later, when the Portuguese refused to pay their tax, the Mutapa enforced a trade ban. This led the Portuguese at Massapa to make a secret pact with the Chizinga rebels, resulting in a joint attack on the Mutapa garrison and the Portuguese withdrawal to the Zambezi Valley.

=== Mutapa Civil War (1624–1632) ===
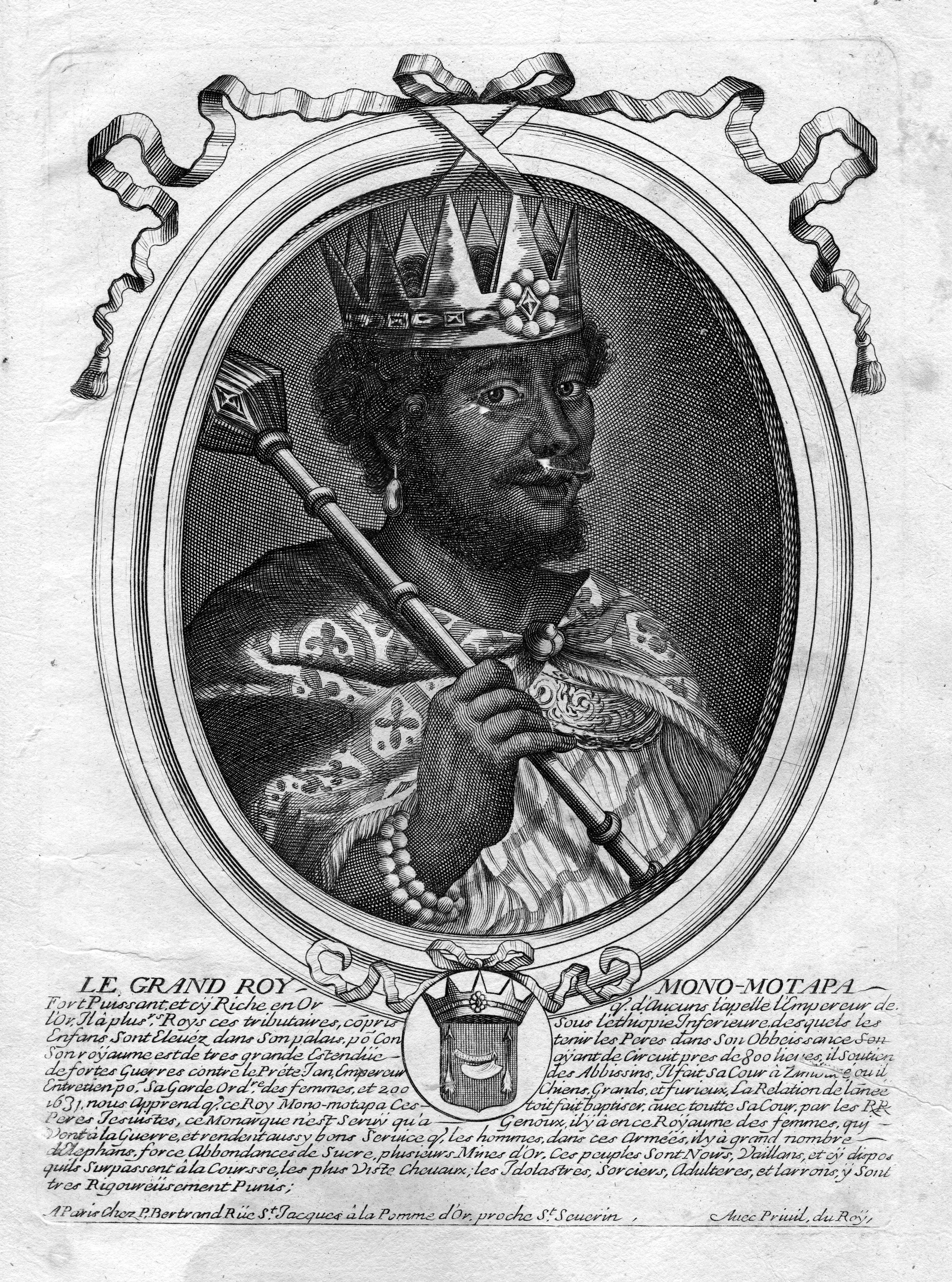
A c. 1860 illustration of Mavura Felipe

In 1624, Nyambo Kapararidze, a son of Gatsi Rusere, succeeded as emperor, although custom required the heir to come from the house of Negomo Mupunzagutu. Mavura Mhande Felipe, the senior son of Mupunzagutu, could therefore claim to be the legitimate ruler, leading to a civil war.

In November 1628, Kapararidze killed the Portuguese ambassador Jerónimo de Barros. His murder provoked an immediate reaction: an army of 15,000 to 30,000 Africans and 250 Portuguese was mobilized, and in May 1629, Kapararidze was defeated after a fierce battle.

Soon after, Mavura Mhande was declared emperor. In return for Portuguese support, he was asked to sign a treaty of vassalage to the Portuguese Crown on 24 May 1629. However, two years later, Kapararidze led a counteroffensive, during which João de Trinidade was killed, and Luiz de Espirito Santo, refusing to pay homage to Kapararidze, was executed. Kapararidze was eventually defeated in 1632.

In 1631, Caprasine led a widespread rising, attacking Portuguese settlements and killing hundreds, while the Maravi, led by Muzura's son, assaulted Quelimane.

In 1632, Diogo de Sousa de Meneses, the newly appointed captain of Mozambique, brought 200 musketeers and landed at Quelimane. There, he defeated Muzura's son, recruited levies at Luabo, and marched to Manica, where he sacked the capital, killed the ruling Chicanga, and replaced him with a Portuguese nominee. Sousa then marched into Karangaland and destroyed Caprasine's forces near the site of his previous victory. Caprasine escaped across the Zambesi, but by the end of 1632, his rebellion was suppressed, and Mavura once again reigned.

== Bibliography ==
- Kaplan, Irving (October 18, 1977). Area Handbook for Mozambique. University of Minnesota.
- Stewart, John (1989). African States and Rulers. Jefferson: McFarland & Company, Inc. ISBN 0-89950-390-X.
- Pikirayi, Innocent (July 15, 2002). The Zimbabwe Culture. AltaMira Press. ISBN 9780585386492.
- Denis, Philippe (May 18, 2016). The Dominican Friars in Southern Africa. Brill. ISBN 9789004320017.
- Newitt, M. D. D. (1995). A history of Mozambique. Indiana University Press.
