= Agbekoya =

Date	1968–1969
Location	Oyo State, Nigeria
Result	Uprising crushed

Belligerents
Nigeria	Yoruba peasant farmers

Commanders and leaders
(Nigeria) Obafemi Awolowo	Mustapha Okikirungbo Tafa Popoola Adeniyi Eda Adeagbo Kobiowo Rafiu Isola Mudasiru Adeniran

The Agbekoya Parapo Revolt of 1968–1969, popularly known as Agbekoya or the Egbe Agbekoya Revolt, was a peasant revolt in Nigeria's former Western region, home to the majority of the country's Yoruba population. The war was fought and won against the Federal government of Nigeria by the Ibadan people of present Oyo State, on behalf of all Yoruba Land. It was spearheaded by two villages in Ibadan: the Akaran and the Akufo village. It is the most well known peasant-driven political revolt in western Nigerian history, and continues to be referenced by grassroots organizations as a successful example of collective action against unpopular government policies. The revolt was predominantly aimed at agitating for a reduction in taxes, though some believed there were also political catalysts.

== Background ==
During the 1950s, the colonial government of Nigeria established local commodity depots in many parts of the country. The depots served as stores of exchange for goods the government was interested in buying from peasants. The prosperous Western region was one of the world's most prolific producers of cocoa, and the regional government hoped to increase its tax revenues from farmers by regulating the sale of the crop through state-regulated agricultural cooperatives, also known as marketing boards. Most of the products to be sold were to undergo a process of grading, examination, and sometimes bargaining before purchase. Against this backdrop, a farmers' organization was created to represent the interest of the farmers within the new marketing system. Translated from Yoruba, Agbekoya Parapo means, "the union of farmers who reject suffering." The association was an heir to an indigenous system of work cooperatives akin to trade unionism and drew on a tradition of occupational guilds that had regulated working standards and policies for centuries in the region. Yoruba workers in various professions traditionally organized themselves into "egbes", peer groups and guilds that protected the interests of their members in situations that required collective action.

During the early part of Nigeria's independence, a systematic approach to solving the general problems of the region was taken by the Action Group, the leading political party in the Western Region. Many roads leading to villages were tarred, credit was extended to cooperative societies, and schools were equipped for better education. However, as the Nigerian political scene became more volatile with the jailing of foremost political leader Chief Obafemi Awolowo, the 1966 coup, and the beginning of the Biafran War, politicians came to view the farmers as pawns to be used for electoral strategies. The local depot officials also began to present themselves as minor vassal lords, demanding bribes and other concessions from farmers before accepting their harvest for sale. The provided amenities began to slide towards deplorable conditions, even though the government continued to demand taxes for their upkeep.

Members of the loose farming guilds that eventually coalesced into Agbekoya first developed more militant tactics during an epidemic of swollen-shoot disease on cocoa plantations during the 1950s. Calling themselves the Maiyegun (or 'Life Abundance') League, they resisted attempts by government representatives to destroy affected trees on the premise that farmers could not afford to lose their crops without compensation. Several violent clashes occurred before the matter was settled in favor of the league. As the local depots became institutions in the economic life of average farmers, the organization and many other peasants continued to complain about other issues they found unjust

The primary problems the farmers had were the arbitrary standards used for examination, which meant that significant amounts of harvested cocoa were discarded as unfit for sale; and the low prices they received for the accepted produce that reached the marketplace. The farmers complained about the neglected infrastructure of roads they had to travel to reach the depots. Moreover, they were also asked to pay a flat tax, a hefty imposition during times of economic uncertainty.

== The Revolt ==
Military rule descended on the political scene as a result of the perceived failures of the previous administration by many, including the peasants. Some political elites were soon left from government participation. Also, a few university-educated citizens began to emerge as a result of the education policies of the region in the 1950s. The combination of these elites, mixed with a much more sophisticated leadership among Agbękoya Parapo, created a juxtaposition of sort and a stronger political movement was born. The Agbękoya leaders of the time were Mustapha Okikirungbo, Tafa Popoola, Adeniyi Eda, Adeagbo Kobiowo, Rafiu Isola and Mudasiru Adeniran. The leaders decided to set an organizational target as follows:

- The removal of local government officials pillaging their villages
- The removal of some Baales
- A reduction of the flat Tax rate from $8
- An end to the use of force in tax collection
- An increase in the prices of cocoa
- An improvement of the roads leading to many villages

Peasants shouted Oke mefa laosan! Oke mefa laosan! ("We are only paying 30 shillings!") as they marched through the village after village to persuade the local farmers not to pay any taxes to the military governor of the Western state. These peasants were led by the ringleaders of Adegoke Akekuejo, Tafa Adeoye, Folarin Idowu, Mudasiru Adeniran and Tafa Popoola. Soon, some farmers and their leaders gradually left the villages and marched towards Mapo hall, the seat of the regional government. There, they ransacked the offices of officials, declaring that they would only pay $1.10. Mayhem then descended on the capital city and many villages.

To curtail further violence, the government employed the use of force and violence to quell the uprising and arrested some of the Agbękoya leaders. However, farmers took to violent reprisals on government structures, and as a result, many officials were killed. The Agbękoya era consumed the Western Nigerian political landscape at the same time that the nation was pursuing civil war against Nigeria's Eastern Region in the Biafran War. As a method of protest against the military government, the Agbękoya attacked major symbols of state power like court houses and government building, setting free thousands of prisoners alongside their jailed members. However, the release of Chief Obafemi Awolowo helped to quell the riots, as he negotiated directly with the movement's leaders.

== The Agitators song ==
The Agbekoya are the union formed by farmers who reject suffering while the government apparatus are the machinery of government. So they are the agitators who came out with weapons singing:

Oke mefa l’ a o San

Oke mefa l’ a o San

Bi o gba kuma

Yi o gba ori bi be

Oke mefa l’ a o san.”

Meaning-

“We are paying only 30 shillings.

If it cannot be achieved by the application of cudgels, it would be achieved by the application of cutting of heads.

== Aftermath ==
The aftermath of the riots resulted in the removal of local government official administering the villages, removal of Baales, reduction in flat tax rate, end of the use of force for tax removal, increase in price of cocoa and the improving of roads leading to the villages. The government at the time agreed to these concessions. The riots in the long run was seen as possessing distinctive characteristics which differentiated from earlier riots. The primary reasons for the riots came from the rise of agrarian populism. The widely dispersed geographical nature occurred at almost simultaneously. This manifestation of riot was viewed as an overtly class based manifestation .
