= 2005 Togolese coup d'état =

Date	February 5, 2005 – February 25, 2005
Location	Togo
Result	Successful, resulted in the installment of Gnassingbe's son into power and continuation of dynastic rule in Togo

Belligerents
(Togo) Togolese Armed Forces	(Togo) Political opposition parties and protesters

Commanders and leaders
(Togo) Faure Gnassingbe	(Togo) Emmanuel Bob Akitani (Togo) Gilchrist Olympio

Casualties and losses
- 790 killed and 4,345 injured

The 2005 Togolese coup d'état was the unconstitutional seizure of power by the military in Togo through the appointment of Faure Gnassingbe, son of long-time President Gnassingbe Eyadema, who had ruled the country for 38 years after leading a coup d'état of his own in 1967. On February 5, 2005, President Eyadema suddenly died of a heart attack. Rather than adhering to the Togolese constitution which mandates the Speaker of Parliament act as interim leader until elections are held within 60 days, the Togolese military instead capitalized on the speaker's brief absence during a trip to announce that Eyadema's son Faure Gnassingbe would be sworn in as the new president in order to prevent a "power vacuum" from taking place within the country. In a special session of the National Assembly dominated by the Eyadema clan's ruling party - the Rally of the Togolese People (RTP) - Faure Gnassingbe was overwhelmingly approved as the Speaker of Parliament by a wide margin of 67 to 14. A constitutional amendment was also later passed allowing Faure Gnassingbe to serve his father's term that lasts until 2008.

The seizure of power sparked mass protests domestically and international condemnation abroad. The Economic Community of West African States (ECOWAS) suspended Togo's membership and imposed arms embargoes while the African Union threatened sanctions. Togo was also suspended from the Organisation Internationale de la Francophonie (OIF).

In spite of a two-month ban on protesting to mourn the late leader's death, mass protests were still held in the nation's capital of Lomé where thousands of people demanded Faure Gnassingbe step down. The protests turned violent, resulting in clashes with the military and at least three deaths. Tear gas, stun grenades, and allegedly live ammunition was used by soldiers to disperse the protests.

Following international pressure, Faure Gnassingbe pledged he would hold elections within 60 days but still remained firm on retaining his position beforehand. He then backtracked and resigned on 25 February, being replaced by Bonfoh Abass.

On 24 April, the 2005 Togo Presidential Election was hastily held. Faure Gnassingbe won a resounding victory with 60% of the total votes compared to the main opposition candidate Bob Akitani who only won 38% of the vote. Allegations of vote tampering, ballot box stuffing, and uncounted votes were levied against the government. After Faure Gnassingbe was declared the winner of the election, violence erupted as the opposition called upon its supporters to resist Gnassingbe's presidency. The electoral violence, from 28 March until 5 May, resulted in 790 killed and 4,345 injured. Responses from the international community were mixed: France and ECOWAS deemed the vote as largely fair barring minor irregularities while the European Union (EU) criticized the elections for not meeting democratic standards.
