= Ife-Modakeke conflict =

The Ife-Modakeke Conflict was a series of recurrent interethnic tribal wars between the people of Ife and Modakeke communities in Southwestern Nigeria. It has been described as one of the oldest interethnic conflicts in Nigerian history, with the first reported clashes occurring between 1835 and 1849 as part of the Yoruba Wars, while the last reported clash was in the year 2000, when the then president, Olusegun Obasanjo set up the Olabode George-led committee to look into the conflict.

== Background ==
Ife is regarded by Yoruba people as the land of their origin therefore, the Ife people considered themselves landowners, while the Modakeke people were thought of as tenants and vassals because the Modakeke people had fled to Ife following the fall of the old Oyo Empire during the 19th century. This served as a basis for the tribal wars. The identified immediate causes include cultural differences, politics, and the economy relating to land disputes, creation and location of Local Government Area (LGA) headquarters.

In the last recorded conflict, the Modakeke people had demanded for a local government of their own which lead to the creation of Ife East Local Government Area by the then military Head of state , General Sani Abacha in 1997. The new local government area had been carved out of Ife North and Ife Central Local Government Areas. In turn, the people of Ife wanted the new headquarters of the newly created Local Government Area to be in a place predominantly occupied by Ife indigenes much to the chagrin of Modakeke people. The headquarters was then moved to Oke-Ogbo in spite of initial indications that it was going to be in the Modakeke region of Oke. D.O. The Modakekes revolted resulting in a full blown war that led to the destruction of property and loss of hundreds of lives. This lasted till year 2000 when an Olabode George-led committee was set up by President Olusegun Obasanjo.

== Aftermath ==
An interview conducted by Premium Times found that the relative peace had lasted and the indigenes however noted that minor disputes occur, but they do not become heightened due to the interventions of the traditional rulers; the Ooni of Ife and Ogunsua of Modakeke. Tolerance has been identified as the underlying factor for the peaceful resolution since the year 2000. Intermarriages between the groups have also occurred and is believed to be a factor to ensure lasting peace.
