= France–Libya relations =

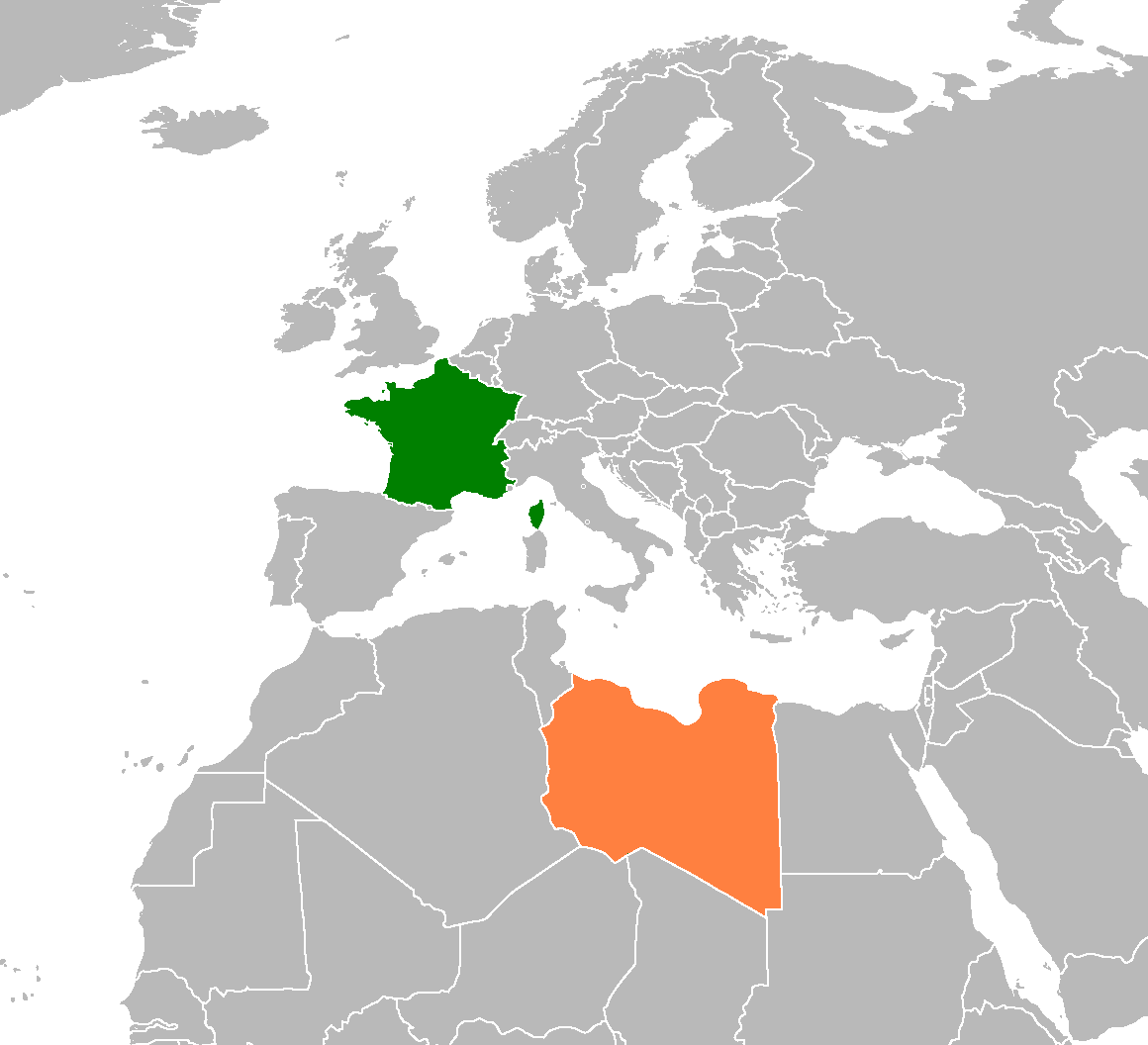

- France: Libya

France–Libya relations are the relations between Libya and France. For the most part, their historical relations are complicated. Libya maintains its embassy in Paris. France also has an embassy in Tripoli.

== France as Middle-Eastern Arms Dealer ==
Libya developed particularly close relations with France after the June 1967 War, when France relaxed its arms embargo on nonfront-line Middle East combatants and agreed to sell weapons to the Libyans, such as the Mirage 5 aircraft. In 1974 Libya and France signed an agreement whereby Libya exchanged a guaranteed oil supply for technical assistance and financial cooperation. By 1976, however, Libya began criticizing France as an "arms merchant", because of its willingness to sell weapons to both sides in the Middle East conflict. France was also Israel's primary arms supplier (from the 1947–1949 Palestine war until the mid-1960s), including selling Israel the same Mirage 5 fighters as it sold Libya. Libya later criticized France for its willingness to sell arms to Egypt. Far more serious was Libya's dissatisfaction with French military intervention in the Western Sahara, Chad, and Zaire. In 1978, Muammar Gaddafi noted that although economic relations were good, political relations were not. He accused France of having reverted to a colonialist policy, which former French president Charles de Gaulle had earlier abandoned.

== Chadian Civil War ==
In the 1980s, Libyan-French discord centered on the situation in Chad. As mentioned, the two countries found themselves supporting opposite sides in the Chadian Civil War. In late 1987, there were 1,300 French troops in Chad, primarily defending the Chadian capital N'DJamena from attack, including an air attack using Tupolev Tu-22 strategic bombers; France also gave $90 million in military aid to Chad that year.". However, French policy did not permit its forces to cross the sixteenth parallel. Thus, direct clashes with Libyan soldiers seemed unlikely. However, Libyan diplomats still accused France of having "direct responsibility" in the escalation of the war, and the Libyan news agency JANA called the raid a "combined Franco-American military action" and charged that Washington and Paris were "behind the aggression against Libya."

== UTA Flight 772 ==
French-Libyan relations deteriorated substantially in the aftermath of the 1989 UTA Flight 772 bombing. On 19 September 1989, a McDonnell Douglas DC-10 airliner operated by French airline UTA (Union de Transports Aeriens) as UTA Flight 772, was destroyed by a bomb in the cargo hold, killing all 170 passengers and crew (including 54 French nationals). France blamed Libya for the attack. The cour d'assise de Paris found six Libyans guilty of the attack and awarded the families of the UTA victims sums ranging from €3 000 to €30 000 depending on their relationship to the dead. The French relatives' group "Les Familles du DC10 d'UTA"[8] signed an agreement on 9 January 2004 with the Gaddafi International Foundation for Charity Associations accepting a compensation payment of $170 million United States dollars, or $1 million for each of the 170 UTA victims. Similarly, US District Judge Henry H. Kennedy (of the District of Columbia) also found Libya directly responsible for the bombing in 2007 (in a trial brought by the families of 7 US nationals killed on the flight). France, as well as other nations affected by this bombing, have continued to seek financial compensation from Libya.

== Libyan civil war ==
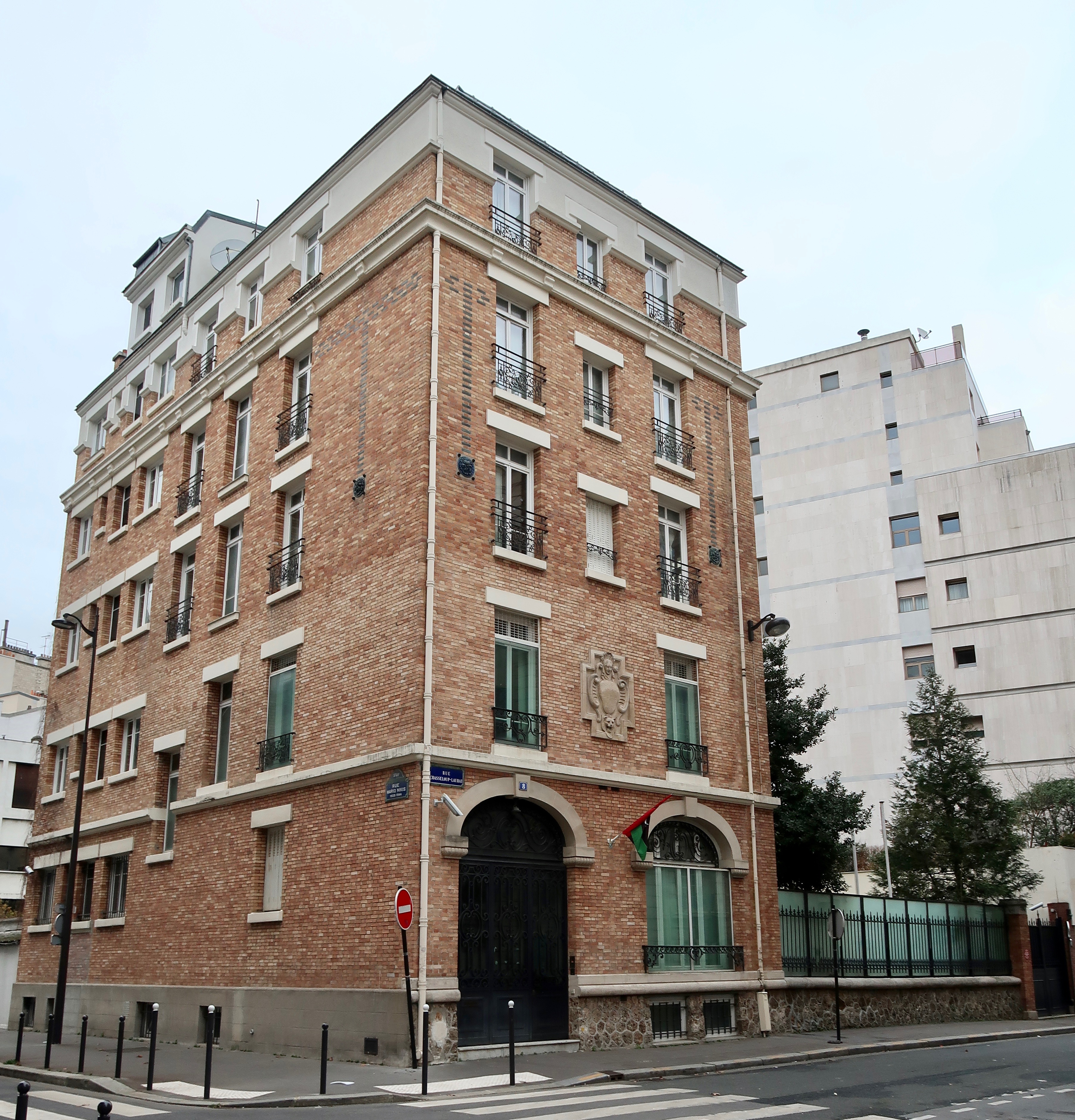
Embassy of Libya in Paris

On 10 March 2011, France was the first country in the world to recognise the National Transitional Council as the legitimate government of Libya, in the context of the Libyan Civil War against Muammar Gaddafi. French Rafale and Mirage 2000 fighter planes also conducted the first military strikes against Gaddafi's forces by the Western nations and the United Nations. On 19 March 2011 approximately 20 such French warplanes destroyed Libyan tanks and armored vehicles. Some reports state that these French air strikes began even before the end of the emergency meetings in Paris between the leaders of the Western nations and therefore were not coordinated with the air strikes of other nations, causing some friction among the allies.

The same month where French forces were committed to the Libyan conflict, Saif-al-Islam Gaddafi, a son of Muammar Gaddafi, gave an interview to euronews in which he first publicly claimed that the Libyan state had donated €50 million to Sarkozy's 2007 presidential campaign in exchange for access and favors by Sarkozy

After the NTC dissolved its executive board on 8 August and tasked its chairman, Mahmoud Jibril, with forming a new one, France called the move "a sovereign decision". In a statement, the French Foreign Ministry said a new board should be "rapidly designated".

In May 2016, French engineering firm Technip announced plans to upgrade a major oil platform in a deal worth $500 million. The platform, located north of Tripoli at the Bahr Essalam oil field is capable of producing 12.6 million barrels a day.

On July 25, peace talks were held in Paris between Prime Minister Fayez al-Sarraj and Marshal Khalifa Haftar. A ceasefire was agreed upon, and elections were promised to be held as soon as possible.

In November 2017 President Macron called the sale of migrants at slave auctions reported to be taking place in Libya "a crime against humanity", and requested a meeting of the UN Security Council to discuss this treatment of migrants in Libya and to consider sanctions against Libya if the slave auctions are not stopped. In February 2018 Macron criticised the 2011 NATO intervention in Libya for creating the conditions for instability and extremism.

In March 2021, President Macron said that on March 29, the French embassy will reopen in Tripoli, Libya.

== See also ==
- Fezzan-Ghadames Military Territory
