= Revolt of Sidi Yahia =

Sidi Yahia Revolt
Date	Late 16th Century
Location	Aures, Algeria
Result	Algerian victory

Belligerents
Chaouis	Regency of Algiers

Commanders and leaders
Sidi Yahia X Abu Abdallah Ahmed (surrendered)	Unknown

Strength
Unknown	Unknown

Casualties and losses
Unknown	Unknown

The rebellion of Cheikh Sidi Yahia ben Solimani al Auresi was a revolt involving the Chaouis and the Regency of Algiers.

== Background ==
Before his rebellion, Cheikh Sidi Yahya was employed by the Regency of Algiers, serving as a legal expert, Due to his excellent reputation, Cheikh Sidi Yahya, often summoned to Algiers, earned the trust of the pachas who wouldn't make significant decisions without consulting him. This attested to his importance and social status.

However, such regard inevitably stirred envy. Faced with hostility, he had to escape to Constantine with his brother, Aboul Abbas Ahmed. Nevertheless, his adversaries pursued him, falsely claiming he was plotting a rebellion.

== Revolt ==
Sidi Yahia and his brothers had to flee Constantine, seeking refuge in the Aurès, as a crowd of Arabs from the Ouled Aïssa tribe and the Guerfa pursued them.

The rebellion escalated to the point where sending troops from Algiers became necessary. Despite several futile battles, the Algerians had to withdraw without achieving any success.

The revolt persisted in a state of insurgency for a while, but discord eventually emerged among the rebels. A rival faction deceptively lured Cheikh Sidi Yahia to a gathering under the pretext of a social evening. Despite foreknowing the peril, the cheikh willingly attended and was fatally attacked during the night. It was purportedly predestined in the decrees of God.

Following this assassination, his son, Abu Abdallah Ahmad, assumed control of the rebellion. However, due to the intense internal strife leading to his father's death, he decided to end the revolt and surrendered to Constantine. They accepted him and granted him amnesty.
