= Sadiavahy Rebellion =

1915–1917 uprisings in southern Madagascar against French colonial rule

Sadiavahy rebellion
Date	1915–1917
Location	Southern Madagascar
Result	Rebellion suppressed and leaders imprisoned, exiled, or sentenced to forced labor

Belligerents
(France) French Madagascar	Antandroy; Bara; Mahafaly

Commanders and leaders
(France) Hubert Auguste Garbit	Fanolahy; Tsirekitsy; Masikavelo; Mahatomby; Efantanà; Ralenje

Casualties and losses
- Unknown

The Sadiavahy rebellion was anti-colonial uprisings that broke out in southern and western Madagascar between 1915–1917. These revolts, though smaller than the Menalamba rebellion, expressed widespread resistance to the French colonial system, particularly its heavy taxation, forced labour and suppression of free speech and dissent.

== Background ==
The Sadiavahy movement emerged in the Southern Madagascar (Ampanihy, Ampotaka, Ambovombe) recently conquered by the French colonialists. Most tribes of the South were independent from the Hova rule and not used to taxation and forced labour. It was primarily composed of peasants led by regional clan chiefs such as Fanolahy, Tsirekitsy, Masikavelo, and Mahatomby.

== Causes ==
The main grievances that triggered the uprisings included famine, excessive taxes imposed by the French colonial administration, forced labour, and the arrest and repression of those who criticized colonial policies. Such conditions created deep unrest, especially in rural communities where traditional leaders were increasingly marginalized.

== Objectives ==
The rebels sought to expel the French colonizers from their tribal territory and abolish colonial taxes and forced labour.

== Development ==
Initially, colonial authorities considered the rebellion to be mere banditry or xenophobic violence. However, it evolved into a more organized armed resistance, with guerrilla warfare and ambush tactics becoming common.

== Aftermath ==
The French responded with a harsh military crackdown. The Sadiavahy rebels were poorly equipped compared to French troops, and their resistance was quickly crushed. Rebel leaders were captured, imprisoned, sentenced to forced labor, or exiled from their home regions.

The suppression was particularly brutal due to the context of World War I, during which the French colonial government could not afford internal unrest while facing external threats.

== See also ==
- Menalamba rebellion
- History of Madagascar
- French Madagascar
