= Kumasi Mutiny of 1901 =

Historical event in Ghana

Kumasi Mutiny started on 18 March 1901 in Kumasi, present day Ghana, as the native troops mutinied and fired on British troops. The event persisted for three weeks because the native troops had not been paid for months despite constant promises from the British Government.

== History ==
The Kumasi Mutiny was recorded in the British popular press as the “Coomassie Mutiny”. The African colonial armies were responsible, guarded frontiers, and acted as imperial troops in overseas campaigns. Maintaining internal security was their primary role. The West African Regiment in Asante used their arms and collective muscle to defy and threaten the authorities which employed them in 1901. The native troops had not been paid for months despite constant promises from the British Government, and some of the men were absent without leave from an evening parade. In total, 60 men were absent at first and 178 more men had disappeared the next morning. The native troops mutinied and fired on British troops who returned fire, killing 12 mutineers, which lasted for 3 weeks.

The troops were tried under the Army Act 1881, sentenced and imprisoned in Sierra Leone. A dozen were sentenced to be executed by firing squad, but the sentence was later commuted to penal servitude.

Private Luseini was an NCO of the British West African Regiment. Luseini was one of 134 soldiers imprisoned in Sierra Leone after the Kumasi Mutiny.
