= Raoued Operation =

Operation of Raoued
- Part of Insurgency in the Maghreb (2002–present)
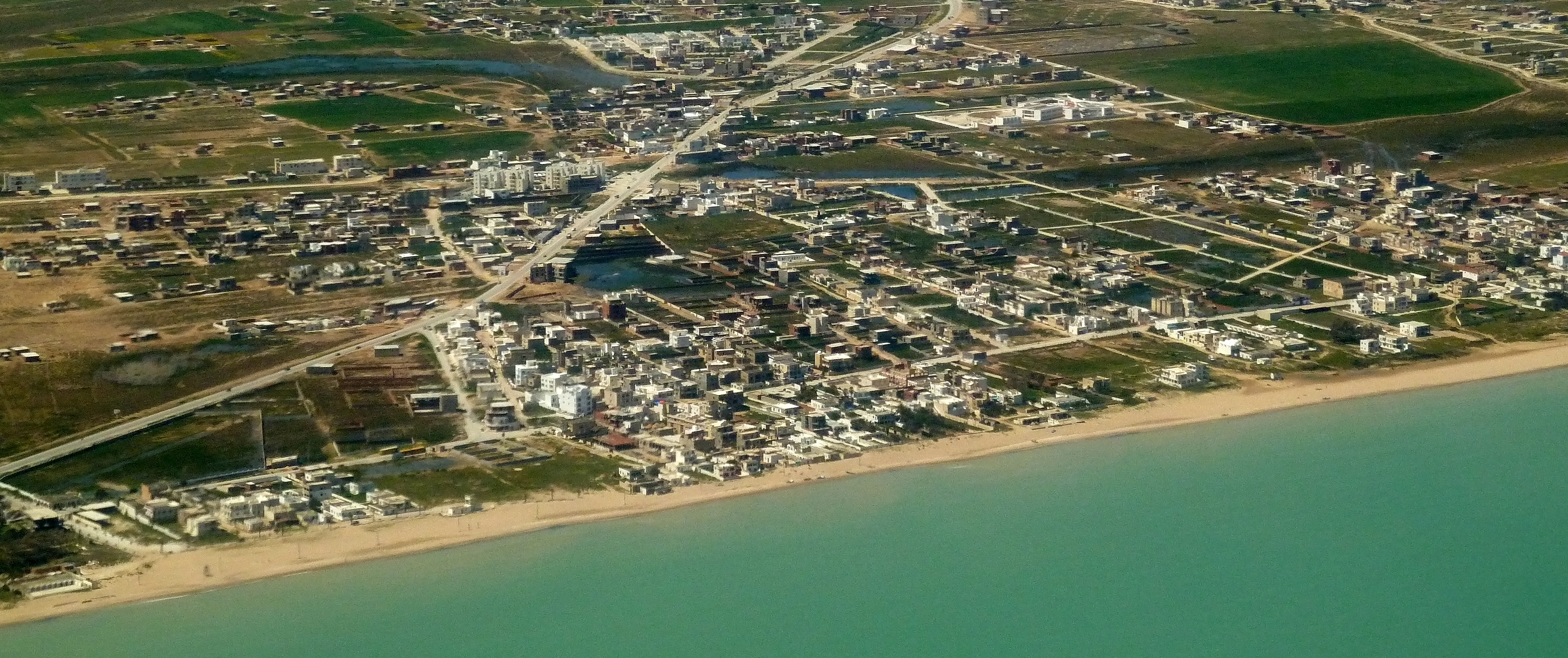
- An aerial view of Raoued in 2012
Date	3–4 February 2014 (1 day)
Location	Raoued 36°57′16″N 10°11′29″E
Result	Tunisian victory

Belligerents
Tunisia	Ansar al-Sharia

Strength
150	8

Casualties and losses
1 dead, 1 wounded	7 dead, 1 captured

The Raoued operation (French: Operation de Raoued) was an anti-terrorist operation that was conducted in February 2014 in Raoued, Tunisia against Salafist extremists.

== Operation ==
On 3 February 2014, the Tunisian police were informed of the presence of armed jihadists in the city of Raoued, located in the suburbs of Tunis.

More than 150 men from the National Guard were sent in the afternoon to surround a house where Salafist fighters were located, while all the roads leading to the city were blocked. In the following hours and until the following day, several firefights broke out between the jihadists and the National Guards. After being dislodged from one house, the Salafists took refuge in a second. Finally, on 4 February at midday, the National Guards launched an assault that defeated the besieged.

== Casualties ==
According to the Ministry of the Interior, seven terrorists were killed in the fight and another was taken prisoner. A National Guard member was also killed - 29-year-old Atef Jabri and sergeant of the special brigade - and another wounded. Among the jihadists killed was Kamel Gadhgadhi, a leader of Ansar al-Sharia, suspected of the February 2013 assassination of Chokri Belaid, and a participant in the Battle of Chaambi.

Three other dead were quickly identified: Mohamed Naceur Dridi, Haykel Badr, and Alaeddine Najahi. In addition to Kamel Gadhgadhi, among the dead would be two other people - Alaeddine Ben Abdelwaheb Njahi said "Abu Haydar" and Ali Ben Mustapha Ben Saad Kala - who allegedly took part in the mutilation of Tunisian soldiers killed during the Battle of Chaambi.
