= Battle of Cairo (1367) =

1367 rebellion in the Egyptian Sultanate

Date	Late 1367
Location	Cairo, Mamluk Sultanate
Result	Victory of al-Ashraf Sha'ban

Belligerents
Mamluk rebels Supported by: Khalil ibn Qawsun	Mamluk Sultanate

Commanders and leaders
Asandamur an-Nasiri (POW)	El-Ashraf Sha'ban; Asanbugha Ibn al-Abu Bakri; Qushtamur al-Mansuri

The Battle of Cairo or Asandamur's rebellion was a clash that took place in late 1367 during the reign of the Mamluk sultan al-Ashraf Sha'ban and ended with the crushing of the rebellion against his rule.

== Background ==
In late 1367, Emir Sayf al-Din Asandamur bin Abdullah an-Nasiri and his newly acquired mamluks moved against al-Ashraf Sha'ban. The revolt was also supported by Emir Khalil ibn Qawsun, the son of former regent Emir Qawsun (d. 1342). Khalil had been promised the throne by Asandamur.

== Battle ==
According to a contemporary Mamluk chronicler, al-Nuwayri al-Iskandarani, al-Ashraf Sha'ban was significantly assisted by the "common people", who killed many of the mamluk rebels, "making them bite the dust". The support of the commoners was enlisted by al-Ashraf Sha'ban's loyalist commanders, emirs Asanbugha Ibn al-Abu Bakri and Qushtamur al-Mansuri, both of whom withdrew from the battle in Cairo and left the commoners to fight Asandamur's forces alone. The commoners were able to turn the tide in favor of al-Ashraf Sha'ban's partisans, and the latter's emirs and Royal Mamluks returned to the battle, defeated the rebels and arrested Asandamur.

== Aftermath ==
Because of their loyalty and key support during the revolt, al-Ashraf Sha'ban treated the commoners well throughout his reign.

== Bibliography ==
- Levanoni, Amalia (1995). A Turning Point in Mamluk History: The Third Reign of Al-Nāṣir Muḥammad Ibn Qalāwūn (1310-1341). Brill. ISBN 978-90-04-10182-1
- Levanoni, Amalia (2006). "Awlad al-nas in the Mamluk Army during the Bahri Period". In Wasserstein, David J.; Ayalon, Ami (eds.). Mamluks and Ottomans: Studies in Honour of Michael Winter. Routledge. ISBN 978-1-136-57917-2
- Steenbergen, Jo Van (2011). "On the Brink of a New Era? Yalbughā al-Khāṣṣakī (d. 1366) and the Yalbughāwīyah" (PDF). Mamluk Studies Review. 15. Middle East Documentation Center, The University of Chicago: 117–152.
