= Sidi Ali Ben Aoun =

Coordinates: 34°51′00″N 9°01′48″E

- Commune and town
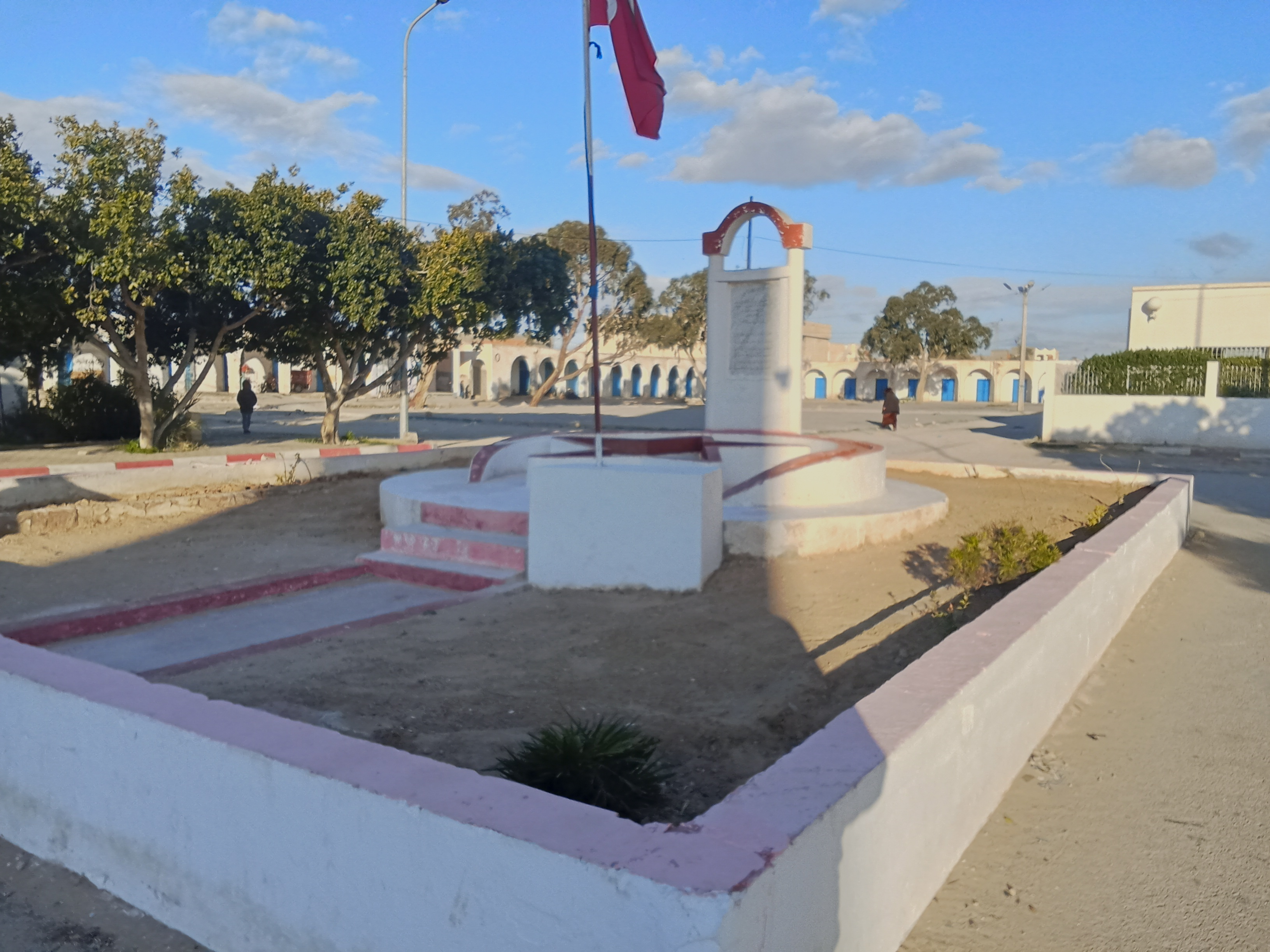
- Interactive map of Sidi Ali Ben Aoun
- Country: Tunisia
- Governorate: Sidi Bouzid Governorate

Population (2014)
  - Total: 9,297
- Time zone: UTC+1 (CET)

Sidi Ali Ben Aoun is a town and commune in the Sidi Bou Zid Governorate, Tunisia. As of 2004 it had a population of 7,403.

== See also ==
- List of cities in Tunisia
