= 2006 Chadian coup attempt =

2006 attempt to overthrow President Idriss Déby

2006 Chadian coup d'etat attempt
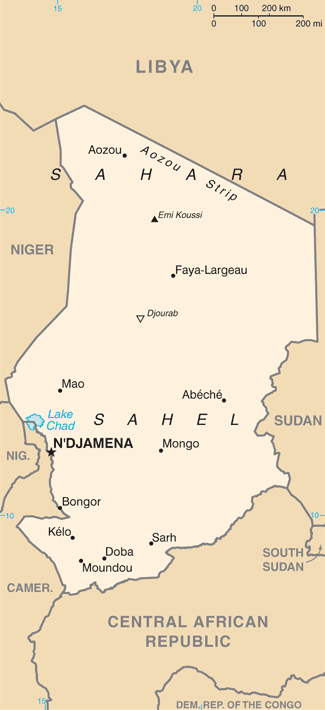
Date	March 14, 2006
Location	Chad

The 2006 Chadian coup attempt was an attempted coup d'état against Chadian President Idriss Déby that was foiled on the night of March 14, 2006.

== Plot ==
The coup plot was led by brothers Tom and Timane Erdimi, two high-ranking Chadian military officers, who previously tried overthrowing former General Seby Aguid and Déby in 2004.

Déby’s plane was departing the CEMAC summit with other Central African leaders in Bata, Equatorial Guinea for N'Djamena, Chad.

According to Hourmadji Moussa Doumngor, minister of communications and culture, the rebel soldiers fled in seven vehicles after soldiers loyal to the president foiled the attempt. Two vehicles were stopped and "their occupants neutralized". The remaining vehicles were pursued by Chadian forces eastern part of the country. There were reports that between March 14 and 15 N'Djamena’s two mobile phone networks shut down. This was likely done by the government as part of the security operation.

Doumngor said the Erdimi brothers were captured, while stating other plotters were former military or civilian government officials living in Burkina Faso, Cameroon, Sudan, and the United States.

Security Minister Routouang Yoma Golom told reporters, "There are around 100 members of the military implicated in this coup who have been arrested. They will be brought to trial. ... The situation is totally under control and calm has returned. The head of state has personally gone several times to military camps to restore order." Golom also said a military court would sentence them in the next one to two months.

Chadian rebels said that they would block the May 3 election. Doumgor responded in saying the elections will not be postponed.

== Reaction ==
French Foreign Ministry spokesman Jean-Baptiste Mattei said the French were following the situation with the greatest vigilance, given that Chad is going through a difficult situation because of the Darfur crisis.

Yaya Dillo Djérou, member of Platform for Change, Unity and Democracy, a subgroup of the UFDC, said the UFDC had tried to "smoke out the president from N'Djamena, but our plan was declared by some secret agents and then our people had to cancel the plan and get out of the town." Djérou was speaking in eastern Chad.

Suliman Baldo, Africa program director of the International Crisis Group think tank, said that "the calendar is really driving events ... the armed groups bent on toppling him don't want him to get to the elections."

The African Union issued a statement: "The President of the Commission of the African Union (AU) has strongly condemned the attempted coup d'état that has taken place in N'Djamena, Chad, in the night between March 14 and March 15, 2006. Conformly to the Algiers Decision of July 1999 and the Lomé Declaration of July 2000 on changes of government by unconstitutional means, the President of the Commission has reiterated the AU's opposition to all taking power by violent means. The President of the Commission has launched an appeal to Chadian politicians so that they use dialogue to sort out their differences and promote the democratic process in their country."

Chad accused Sudan of instigating the coup attempt.

== Reassurances by Déby ==
On March 18, Libyan leader Muammar Gaddafi phoned President Déby, who reassured Gaddafi that "The situation in Chad is under control."

== See also ==
- Chadian coup of 1975
- Chadian Civil War (2005–2010)
- Government of Chad
- History of Chad
- United Front for Democratic Change
