= List of conflicts in Morocco =

Location of Morocco in northern Africa.

== Ancient Times ==
=== Carthaginian Empire ===
Western Mediterranean, 218 BC. Italian cities and Celtic tribes that joined Hannibal after the invasion of Italy are depicted in Blue.

- 264 B.C.E. — 146 B.C.E. Punic Wars

=== Kingdom of Numidia ===
- 112 B.C.E. — 106 B.C.E. Jugurthine War

=== Roman Province of Mauretania Tingitana ===
- 420s C.E. Vandals conquer the Roman province

== Medieval Times ==
=== Vandal Kingdom ===
- June 533 C.E. — March 534 C.E. Vandalic War

=== Byzantine Africa ===
- 534 C.E. — 577 C.E. The Moorish Wars
  - 534 C.E. First Moorish uprising
  - 536 C.E. Military mutiny
  - 544 C.E. Second Moorish uprising and the revolt of Guntharic
- 577 C.E. Conflict with Moorish kingdom of Garmul

=== Byzantine Exarchate of Africa ===
- 647 C.E. — 709 C.E. Muslim conquest of the Maghreb

=== Umayyad dynasty ===
Expansion of Rashidun Caliphate

- 680 C.E. — 692 C.E. Second Fitna
- 739 C.E. — 743 C.E. Berber Revolt
  - circa 740 C.E. Battle of the Nobles
  - circa October 741 C.E. Battle of Bagdoura
- 744 C.E. — 746 C.E. Third Fitna

=== Fatimid dynasty ===
- 1020 C.E. Fatimid Civil War

=== Almoravid dynasty ===
- 1053 C.E. — 1080 C.E. Almoravid conquest of Northern Africa

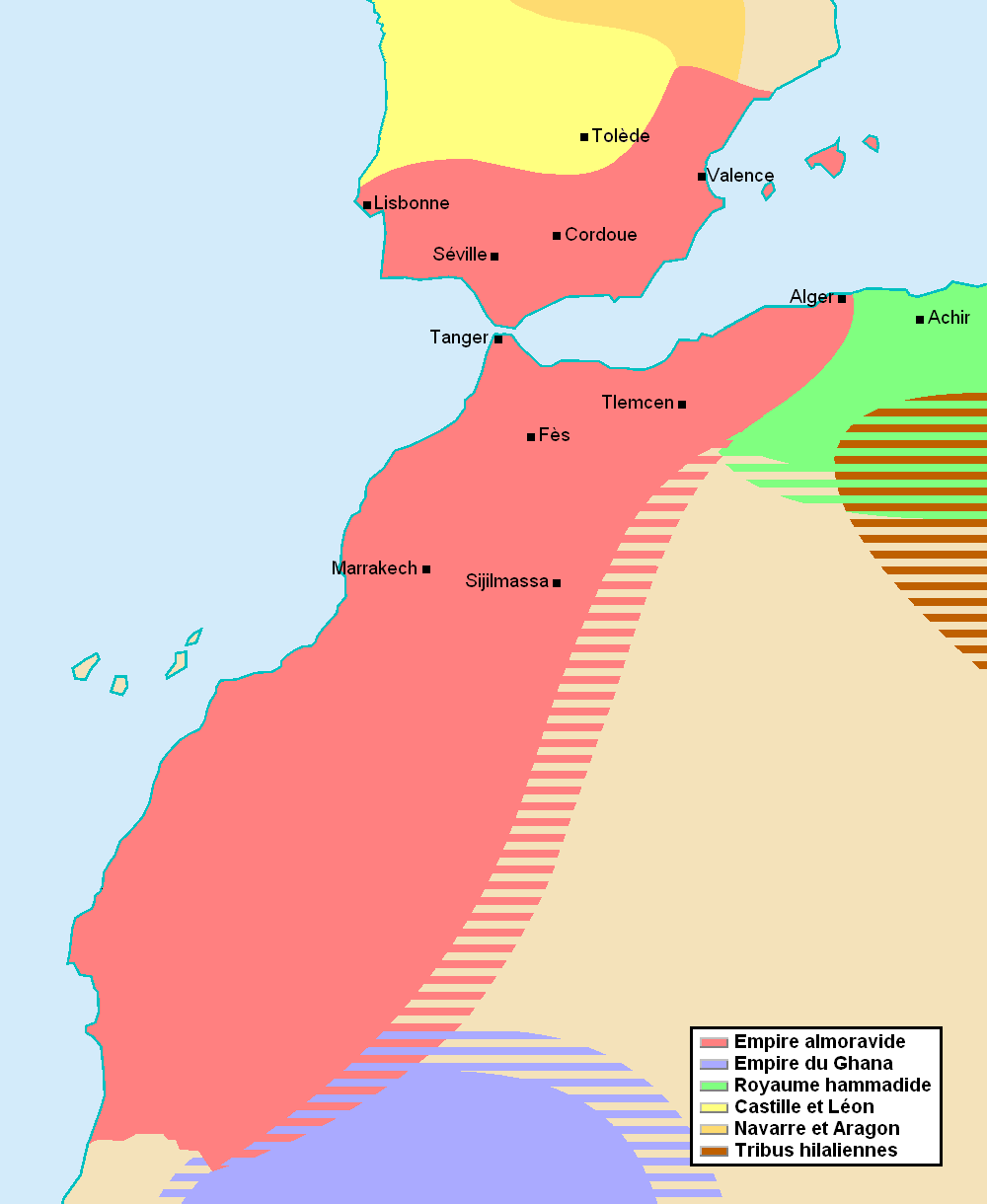
The Almoravid empire at its greatest extent, c. 1120.

=== Almohad dynasty ===
- 1160 C.E. All of Ifriqiya conquered and annexed by the Almohads

== Modern Times ==
=== Marinid dynasty ===
- 1415 C.E. — 1578 C.E. Moroccan—Portuguese conflict
  - August 22, 1415 C.E. Conquest of Ceuta
  - August 1419 C.E. Siege of Ceuta
  - September 13, 1437 C.E. — October 19, 1437 C.E. Battle of Tangier
  - August 24, 1471 C.E. Conquest of Asilah
  - August 28, 1513 C.E. — August 29, 1513 C.E. Battle of Azemmour
  - March 1541 C.E. — September 1541 C.E. Fall of Agadir
  - August 4, 1578 C.E. Battle of Alcácer Quibir
- 1465 C.E. Moroccan Revolt

=== Wattasid dynasty ===
- 1492 C.E. — 1898 C.E. Spanish colonial campaigns
  - 1278 C.E. — 1958 C.E. Hispano-Moroccan wars
    - September 1497 C.E. Conquest of Melilla

=== Saadi dynasty ===
- 1603 C.E. — 1627 C.E. War of the Saadi Dynasty Succession
  - September 1627 C.E. Civil War During the Reign of Zidan al-Nasir
- 1492 C.E. — 1898 C.E. Spanish colonial campaigns
  - 1278 C.E. — 1958 C.E. Hispano-Moroccan wars
    - 1689 C.E. Siege of Larache

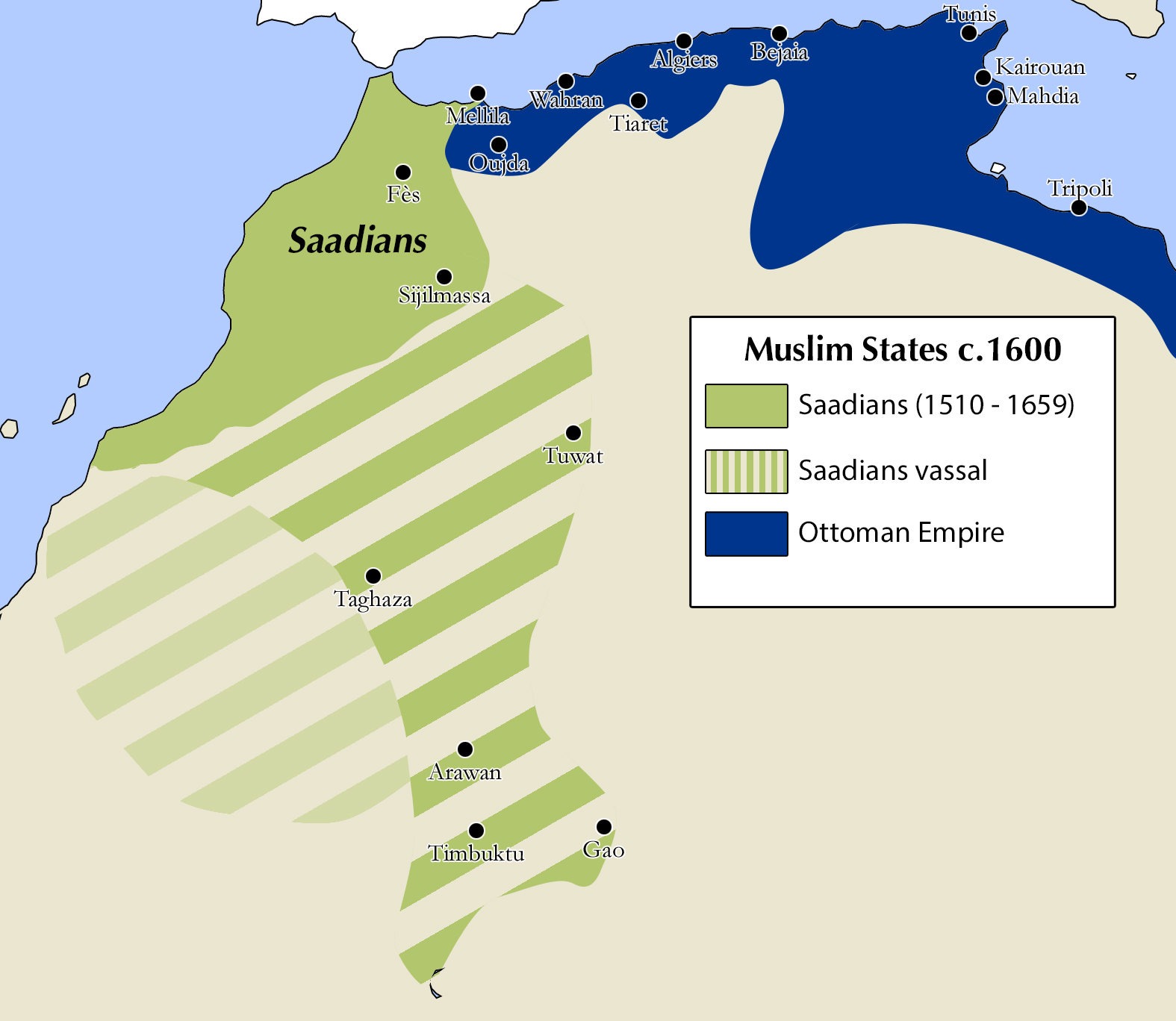
Extent of the Saadian empire during the reign of Ahmad al-Mansur

=== Alaouite dynasty ===
- 1492 C.E. — 1898 C.E. Spanish colonial campaigns
  - 1278 C.E. — 1958 C.E. Hispano-Moroccan wars
    - December 9, 1774 C.E. — March 19, 1775 C.E. Siege of Melilla
- 1775 C.E. — 1777 C.E. Dutch-Moroccan War
- 1844 C.E. First Franco—Moroccan War
  - August 6, 1844 C.E. Bombardment of Tangiers
  - August 14, 1844 C.E. Battle of Isly
  - August 15, 1844 C.E. — August 17, 1844 C.E. Bombardment of Mogador
- October 22, 1859 C.E. — April 26, 1860 C.E. Spanish—Moroccan War
  - 1860 C.E. Battle of Tétouan
- 1492 C.E. — 1898 C.E. Spanish colonial campaigns
  - 1278 C.E. — 1958 C.E. Hispano-Moroccan wars
    - 1893 C.E. Rif War
    - 1909 C.E. Rif War

=== French protectorate in Morocco ===
- 1911 C.E. — 1912 C.E. French conquest of Morocco
  - September 6, 1912 C.E. Battle of Sidi Bou Othman
- July 28, 1914 C.E. — November 11, 1918 C.E. World War I
  - July 28, 1914 C.E. — November 11, 1918 C.E. North Africa during World War I
    - 1914 C.E. — 1921 C.E. Zaian War
- 1492 C.E. — 1898 C.E. Spanish colonial campaigns
  - 1278 C.E. — 1958 C.E. Hispano-Moroccan wars
    - 1920 C.E. — 1926 C.E. Rif War
    - 1957 C.E. — 1958 C.E. Ifni War
- September 1, 1939 C.E. — September 2, 1945 C.E. World War II
  - June 10, 1940 C.E. — May 2, 1945 C.E. Mediterranean and Middle East theatre of World War II
    - June 10, 1940 C.E. — May 13, 1943 C.E. North African Campaign
      - November 8, 1942 C.E. — November 16, 1942 C.E. Operation Torch
        - November 8, 1942 C.E. — November 16, 1942 C.E. Naval Battle of Casablanca
        - November 8, 1942 C.E. Battle of Port Lyautey
- July 17, 1936 C.E. — April 1, 1939 C.E. Spanish Civil War
  - July 17, 1936 C.E. — July 18, 1936 C.E. Military uprising in Melilla

=== Kingdom of Morocco ===
- 1963 C.E. Sand War

== See also ==
- Royal Moroccan Armed Forces
- Royal Moroccan Army
- Royal Moroccan Navy
- Royal Moroccan Air Force
- Military history of Africa
- African military systems to 1800 C.E.
- African military systems 1800 C.E. — 1900 C.E.
- African military systems after 1900 C.E.
