= First Melillan campaign =

1893-94 war between Spain and Morocco

Melilla War
- Part of the Spanish-Moroccan conflicts and Scramble for Africa
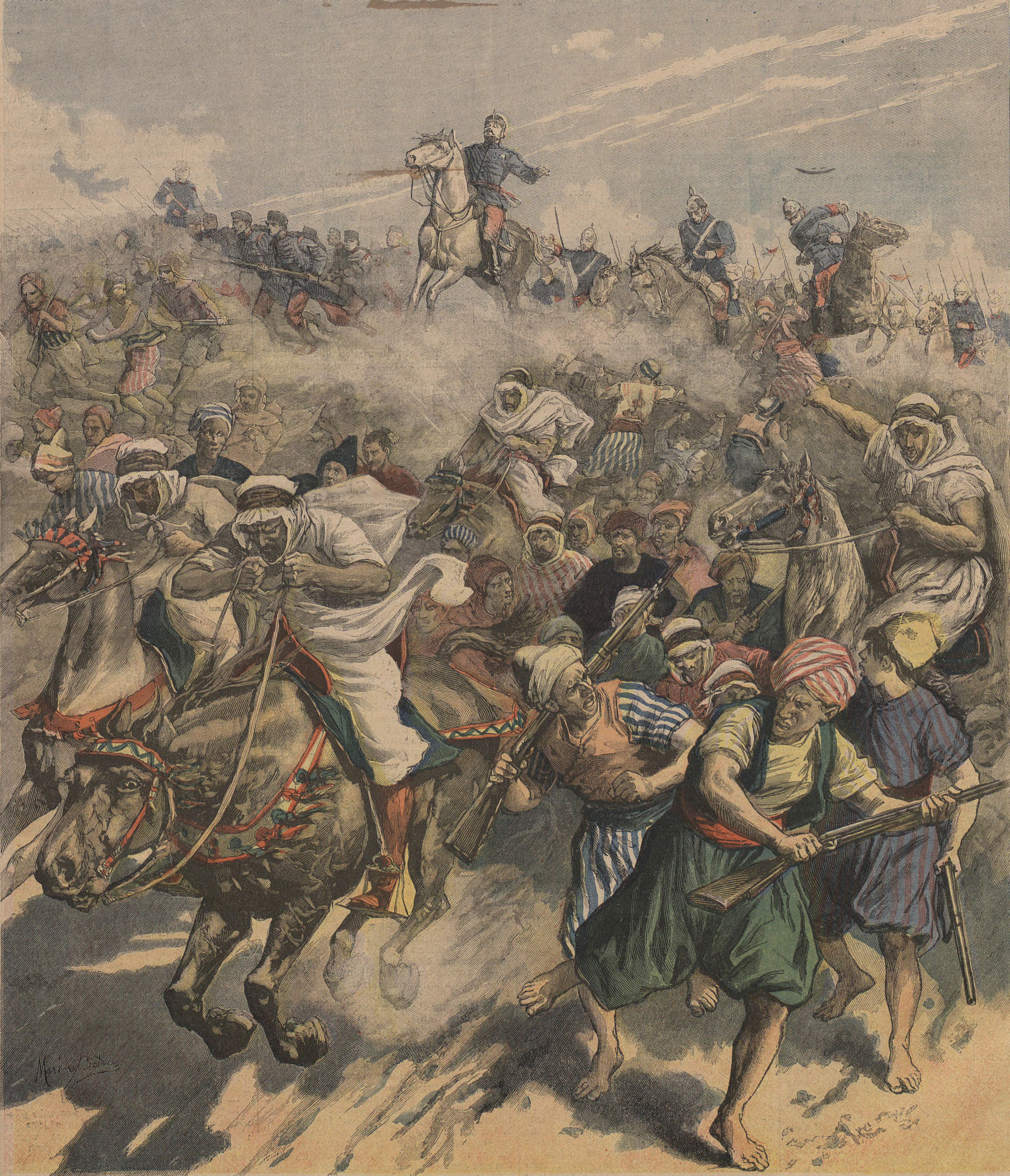
- War in Morocco, Death of the Spanish General Margallo, from Le Petit Journal, 13 November 1893.
Date	9 November (de facto 3 October) 1893 – 25 April 1894
Location	Rif, northern Morocco, near Melilla
Result	Spanish victory Treaty of Fez
Territorial changes	The Melilla hinterlands are ceded to Spain

Belligerents
Spain	Morocco; Riffian tribes

Commanders and leaders
(Spain) Juan Margallo † (Spain) Martínez-Campos	(Morocco) Hassan I (Morocco) Baja al-Arbi (Morocco) Mimoun Mokhtar (Morocco) Hadj Haddou

Strength
25,000 regulars and militia	40,000 irregulars

Casualties and losses
44 killed, 206 wounded	More than 500 killed in November of 1893

The first Melillan Campaign, also known as the Melilla War or the Margallo War (after Juan García y Margallo, the Spanish governor of Melilla whose defeat and death infuriated the Spanish public) in Spain, was a conflict between Spain and the Riffian tribes of northeastern Morocco, and later the Sultan of Morocco, that began in October 1893, was openly declared November 9, 1893, and was resolved by the Treaty of Fez in 1894.

== Historical situation ==
The Crown of Castile captured the citadel of Melilla in 1497. In the 19th century Spain moved into the outlying territories and began investing in their economic development. Treaties with Morocco in 1859, 1860, and 1861 consolidated Spain's growing interests. Although Spain enjoyed the compliance of the Moroccan government, tensions flared between Spanish Army patrols and the local Riffian tribes that were hostile to Spain, and over whom the Sultan had practically no control.

Riffian raiding and piracy was widely reported in the Spanish press and produced the occasional sensational incident. In the early 1890s the Riffians captured a Spanish merchant vessel and abducted its crew; a small rescue expedition headed by the Spanish cruiser Isla de Luzon concluded that the captives had been sold into slavery. Over the summer of 1893 a period of renewed agitation by the locals enabled García y Magallo to secure the funds for the expansion of fortifications surrounding the city. Construction was pushed forward as fast as possible, the main effort being to erect new redoubts at Peuta de Cabiza and Punta Dolossos.

== Siege of Melilla ==
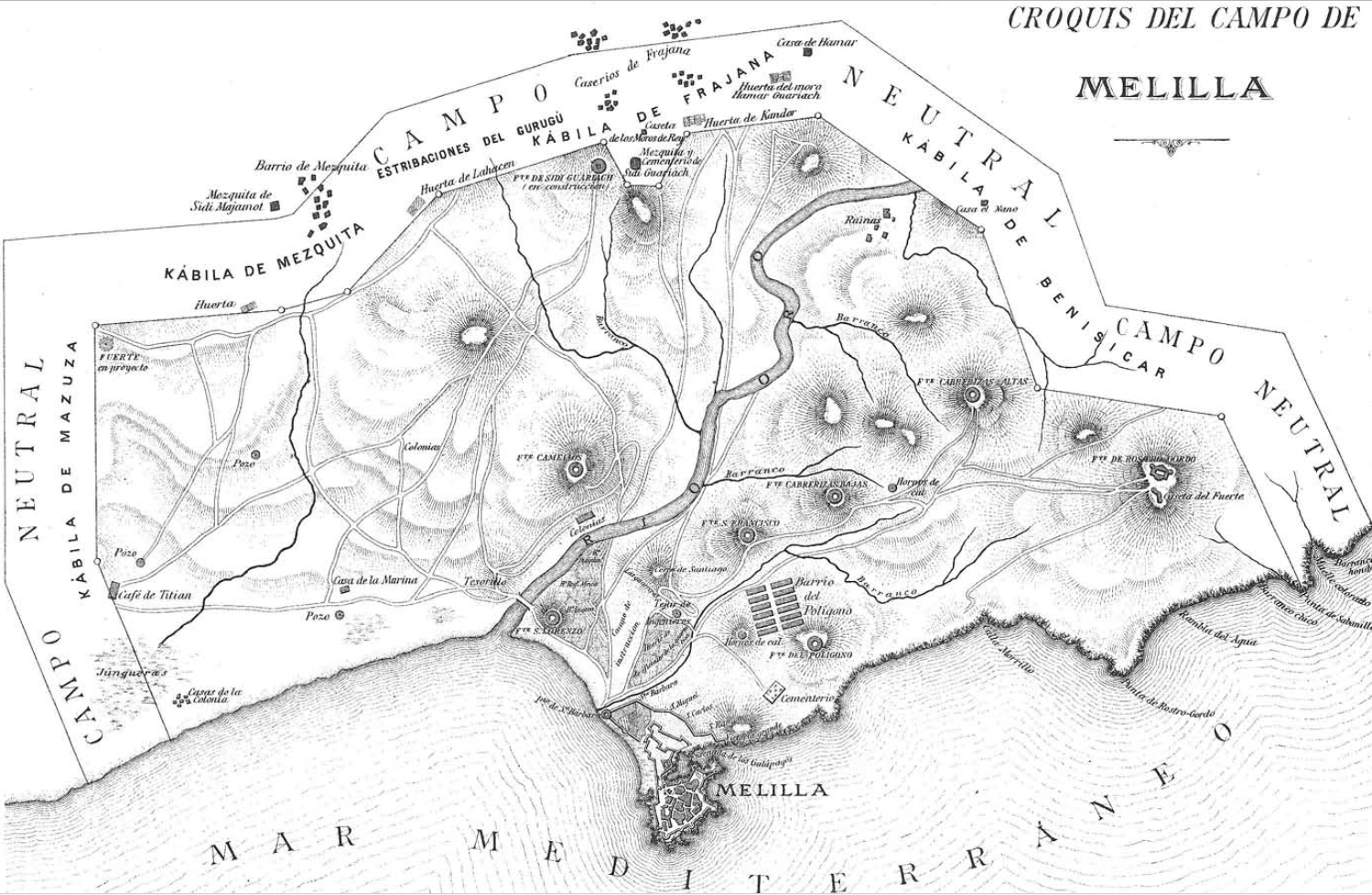
Sketch of the field of Melilla, in La Ilustración Artística, November 13, 1893.

After a period of escalating violence the war began in earnest on October 3 when 6,000 Riffian warriors armed with Remington rifles descended from the mountains and attacked the city's garrison of 400 regular infantry. The Spaniards fought a bloody daylong battle without relief, losing 21 dead and 100 wounded, while the citizens of Melilla fled to the citadel. Although a civilian corps was organized to aid in the defence, the weight of the attackers, whose ranks were swelled by tribesmen from the hills, compelled the last of the defenders to retire to the fortress.

Lacking any form of heavy weaponry, the Riffians tried to take the citadel by storm, charging up the road ways and scaling the walls. Foreign observers described it as an act of gallant fury, but doomed to failure. The Spaniards held the ramparts with the bayonet and their gunfire swept the attackers from the walls. For the first time, Spanish soldiers wielded their formidable 7 mm Mauser Model 1893's, made famous a few years later at the Battle of San Juan Hill. 160 Riffians died. Spanish artillery was brought forward and used to good effect to bombard the Riffian assembling in neighbouring villages, but when an unlucky cannonade demolished a mosque outside of the city, the Riffian effort took on the character of a jihad. Riffians across the province, whatever their earlier sympathies, rushed to arms against Spain. By October 5 the native force numbered perhaps 12,000, some reports putting its strength as high as 20,000 infantry and 5,000 cavalry.

=== Spanish response ===
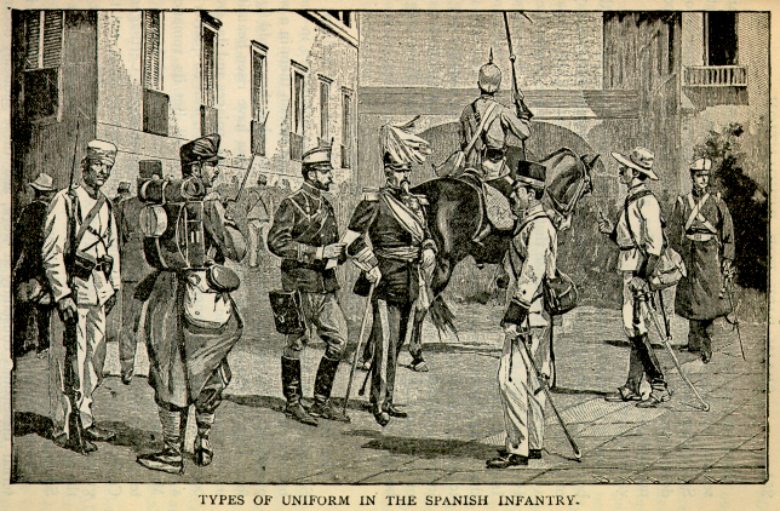
Types of uniform in the Spanish infantry.

News of the attack brought war fever to Spain. The government dispatched the ironclad Numancia and two gunboats stationed at Málaga, put the fleet on alert, and mobilized the Army of Andalusia for service abroad. Newspapers and patriotic citizens of every stripe clamoured for vengeance at whatever cost in blood or treasure. The troops mobilizing to bolster Melilla's garrison, initially numbering about 3,000, received in many cities ceremonies and ovations from the populace as they moved to the ports.

From the outset Sultan Hassan recognized Spanish grievances and reaffirmed Spain's right to pursue construction of field works for its own protection. However, his reluctance to cooperate in pacifying his own subjects infuriated the Spanish government and people, who found themselves committed to military operations far exceeding their modest financial resources, on account, they believed, of Moroccan negligence.

=== The crisis ===
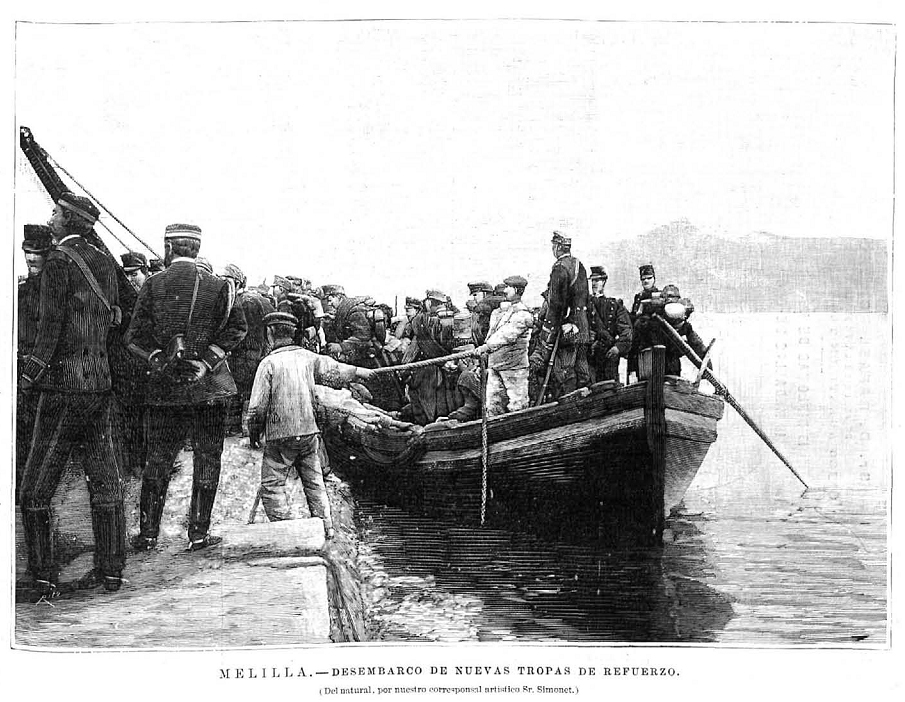
Landing of new reinforcement troops, November 1893, in La Ilustración Española y Americana.

On October 4 the ironclad Numancia shelled several villages along the coast. An artillery detachment from Málaga arrived in Melilla that same day. For several weeks the situation stagnated. Juan García y Magallo, Governor of Melilla and commander of the Spanish forces, issued an ineffective ultimatum while the Sultan dispatched a contingent of regular troops under Baja-el-Arbi to restore the situation, without success. Skirmishes were fought at forts Camellos and San Lorenzo. When the Riffians tore down the forts they'd captured, Margallo deployed small parties of infantry and workmen to throw up new earthworks at forts Cabrerizas and Rostro Gordo, under cover of the Spanish batteries.

On October 22 the gunboat Conde de Venadito steamed to the mouth of the Río de Oro, anchored there, and turned her Hotchkiss guns on the Riffians. The ship hurled 31 shells at the Riffian trenches and returned to Melilla's harbour without sustaining any damage. 5,000 Riffians in turn made a heavy attack on the heights of Sidi Guariach on October 27 and, despite again running afoul the guns of the Venadito and the Spanish batteries, drove General Margallo and General Ortega back into the citadel and seized their half-finished field works.

=== Margallo's sortie ===
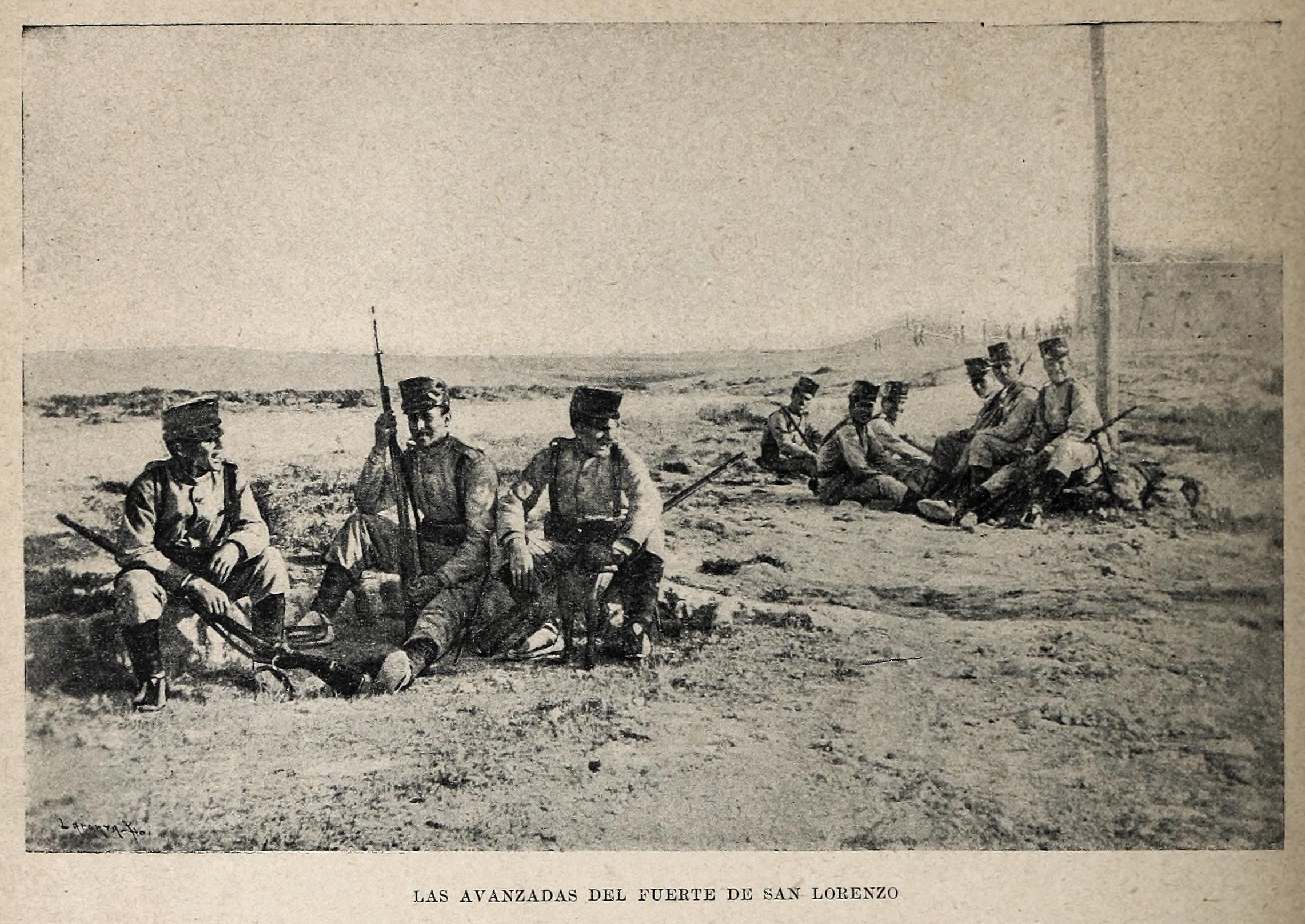
The advanced troops of the Fort of San Lorenzo.

To dislodge the Riffians from the works near Cabrerizas and Rostro Gordo Margallo rode out on October 28 at the head of a column of 2,000 men. The Riffians in the trenches numbered about 3,000 men; both sides fought with courage but the Rif warriors held the line while their main body flocked 6,000 reinforcements to the battle. With this numerical superiority the Rif fighters extended their line in an attempt to envelop Margallo's Spaniards. The general, thinking he saw the enemy centre weaken, led a charge against the Riffian trenches and was thrown back with heavy losses.

Margallo sounded a retreat. He was shot dead moments later and his detachment collapsed. The Spanish Army admitted to at least 70 men killed and 122 wounded that day; actual losses were probably much higher. Only General Ortega's rearguard actions kept the retreat from becoming a rout.

News of the disaster, coupled with Ortega's telegrams, convinced the Cabinet to send out an additional three regiments of cavalry and four battalions of infantry that day. The next morning, October 29, Ortega led 3,000 men out of Cabrerizas and swept the Riffians from their ruined trenches.

Among the survivors of Margallo's last sortie was a young Lieutenant named Miguel Primo de Rivera, future dictator of Spain, who was awarded the Laureate Cross of Saint Ferdinand for his rearguard actions on that day.

== Stalemate ==
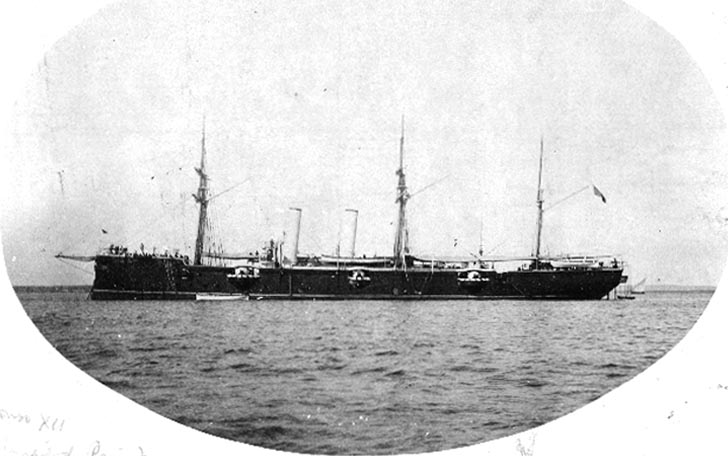
Spanish cruiser Alfonso XII during the 1890s.

Early November found the besieged locked in a desperate struggle for survival. Large Rif forces held the beaches, frustrating the Spanish Navy's efforts to disembark horses, troops, and supplies. The Rif expanded their trenches around the city and set up fortified camps, blocking off all communication between the citadel and the outlying forts and destroying the roads between them. Only the desperate fighting of nighttime sorties kept the outposts supplied with water, rations, and munitions.

Still the defenders held out and heavy fire from the fortress checked Rif advances and kept the town clear of invaders. Spanish retaliation often took gruesome turns: convicts and penal labourers were assembled into search and destroy units led by army officers and crept out into the night to ambush Rif patrols. These units both terrified the Rif and captured the imagination of the foreign press with their conspicuous courage and brutality.

At the various forts activity continued without pause: the defenders had no lack of building materials, engineers, and manual labourers and managed to continue constructing their redoubts even while under siege. The Spanish lost 12 officers and 100 men during the month, while Rif losses were fixed at 500 dead, mostly from bombardment.

== Relief and peace ==
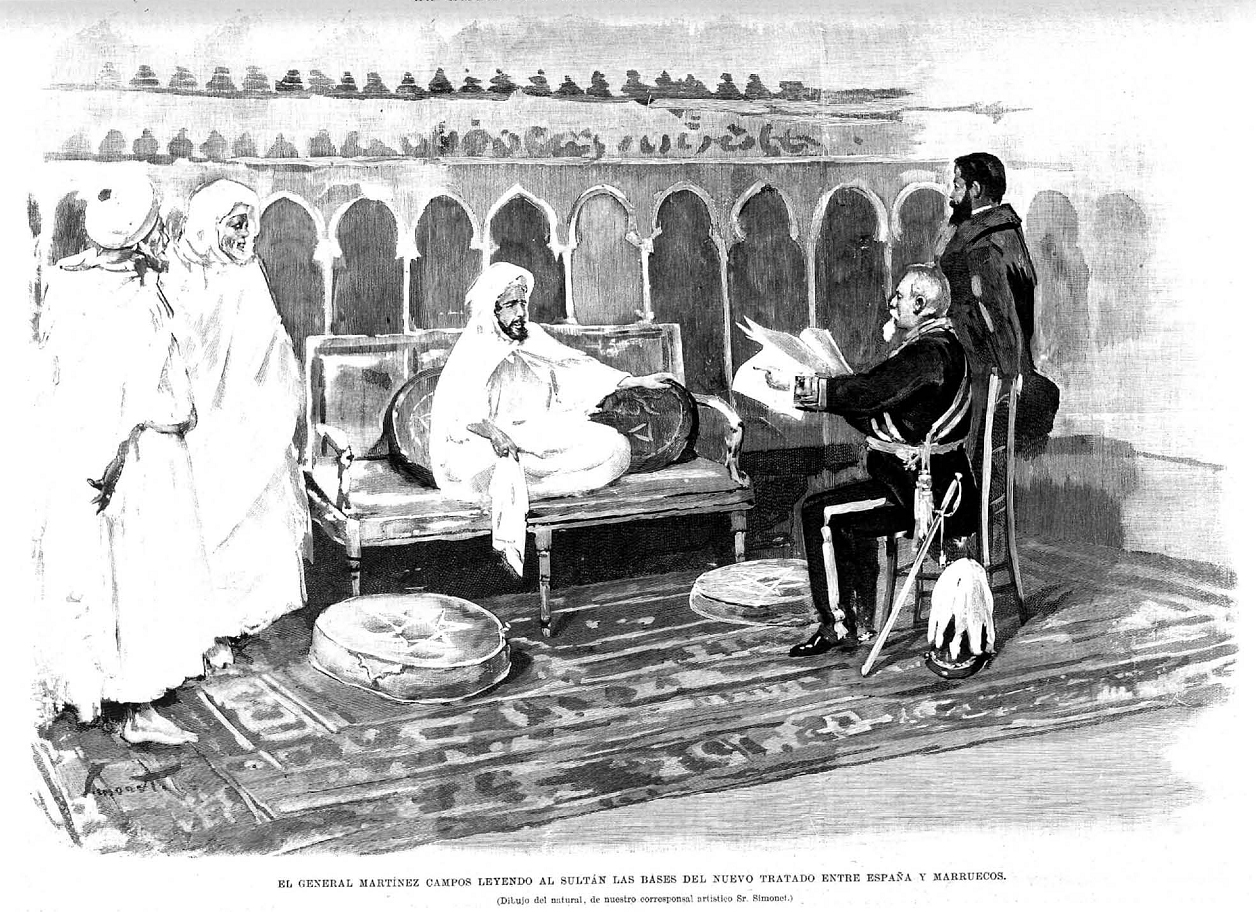
General Martínez Campos reading to the sultan the bases of the new treaty between Spain and Morocco, by Enrique Simonet, in La Ilustración Española y Americana.

With the arrival of the armoured cruisers Alfonso XII and Isla de Luzon, Spain began to apply its naval power to full effect, subjecting the Rif to incessant and untiring bombardment from the coast. On November 6 Spain's naval guns forced a request for parley from the shot-torn Rif. When the Rif proved unwilling to surrender these cannonades were repeated nightly by searchlight, marking the first battlefield use of the device.

At home, Spain's sometimes lethargic military machinery was being brought up to speed in response to Margallo's military reverses, and began to produce visible results for Margallo's successor, General Macias. By the middle of the month, he had received sufficient forces to keep the Rif in check and rebuild Melilla's outer defences. General Martínez-Campos steamed for Melilla on November 27 with 7,000 reinforcements, bringing the total men committed to the war to two Army Corps. In April 1894, Martínez de Campos was appointed Ambassador to Morocco in addition to his military command, and negotiated peace directly with the Sultan.

== Aftermath ==
European powers watched Spain's campaigns against the Rif closely. France, seeking an ally for its own designs on the region, encouraged Spanish territorial expansion at the expense of Morocco. Spain, however, was largely uninterested in an African empire and cautious not to break treaties with the United Kingdom (which viewed any acquisition of territory along the Straits of Gibraltar with alarm). The Spanish therefore demanded only token territorial concessions from the Sultan. This did not discourage French ambitions, however, and in 1912 the Treaty of Fez divided Morocco into French and Spanish protectorates.

As a result of the war, Melilla was granted its own branch of the Guardia Civil, Spain's Gendarmerie.

== See also ==
- Tetuán War
- Second Melillan campaign
- Kert campaign

== Sources ==
- Robles Muñoz, C. (1999). "Guerra de Melilla y reajustes en Europa (1893–1894)". Hispania. 59 (203): 1033–61. doi:10.3989/hispania.1999.v59.i203.582. hdl:10261/17077.
