= Bombardment of Salé (1628) =

Spanish attack to Salé in 1628

Date	May 1628
Location	Salé, Republic of Salé (present-day Morocco) 34°02′43″N 6°49′04″W
Result	Salean victory

Belligerents
Spanish Empire	Republic of Salé

Commanders and leaders
(Spanish Empire) Tomás de Larraspuru y Churruca	Light

Strength
35 ships	Unknown

Casualties and losses
5 killed	Unknown

The bombardment of Salé in May 1628 was carried out by Spanish troops commanded by Tomás de Larraspuru y Churruca against the Moroccan city of Salé, which at that time was a city-state republic ruled by Barbary corsairs.

== Background ==
Following the death of Ahmad al-Mansur in 1603, a war of succession broke out in Morocco, prompting other groups to rebel, including the Republic of Salé, a city-state ruled by Barbary corsairs. Among the main targets of the corsairs of Salé was Spain, which held several cities on the Moroccan coast. During the 1620s, they besieged La Mamora several times, being expelled each time. In 1628, they attempted another siege but were driven back by a Spanish fleet of 35 ships commanded by Tomás de Larraspuru y Churruca, causing many casualties among the corsairs.

== Bombardment ==
A few days after the siege, Tomás de Larraspuru went to Salé with his fleet with the aim of bombing the city. The bombing lasted for several days and was a success, costing few casualties to the Spanish and achieving its objective of restoring normality to the presidios.

== Aftermath ==
Relations between Salé and Spain improved after the conflict, there were even attempts to peacefully incorporate the city into Spain. However, this never happened, mainly because internal conflicts in Morocco resumed in 1636. La Mamora was besieged by Morocco several times until it finally fell in 1681.

Other Spanish cities on the Moroccan coast would fall, such as Larache in 1689 or Asilah in 1691. However, other cities would resist these sieges, such as Ceuta, Melilla and Peñón de Vélez de la Gomera, which today remain Spanish enclaves.

== Bibliography ==
- Mikaberidze, Alexander (22 July 2011). Conflict and Conquest in the Islamic World: 2 volumes [2 volumes]. Bloomsbury Publishing USA. ISBN 978-1-59884-337-8.
- Pennell, C. R. (October 2013). Morocco: From Empire to Independence. Simon and Schuster. ISBN 978-1-78074-455-1.
- Johnson, Jane (5 August 2021). The Sultan's Wife. Bloomsbury. ISBN 978-1-78954-528-9.
- Duro, Cesáreo Fernández (1898). Armada española desde la unión de los reinos de Castilla y de León (in Spanish). Est. tipográfico "Sucesores de Rivadeneyra,".
- Potter, John Stauffer (1960). The Treasure Diver's Guide. Doubleday.
- Martín-Corrales, Eloy (15 December 2020). Muslims in Spain, 1492-1814: Living and Negotiating in the Land of the Infidel. BRILL. ISBN 978-90-04-44376-1.
- Arsenal, León (2018). Enemigos del imperio (in Spanish). ISBN 978-84-414-3901-6.
- de Molina, Triso; Gallent, Guillermo Guastavino (1939). La toma de la Mámora: Relatada por Tirso de Molina [pseud.]. M. Boscá, impresor.
- Rézette, Robert (1976). THE SPANISH ENCLAVES IN MOROCCO Par ROBERT REZETTE. Nouvelles Editions Latines.
- Daoud, Zakya (2002). Gibraltar: Improbable frontière : De Colomb aux clandestins (in French). Séguier. ISBN 978-2-84049-310-5.
- O'Reilly, Gerry (1994). Ceuta and the Spanish Sovereign Territories: Spanish and Moroccan Claims. ISBN 978-1-897643-06-8.
- Zurlo, Yves (2005). Ceuta et Melilla: Histoire, représentations et devenir de deux enclaves espagnoles (in French). L'Harmattan. ISBN 978-2-7475-7656-7.
