= Bombardment of Salé =

Bombardment of Salé may refer to

- Bombardment of Salé (1628), by a Spanish fleet
- Bombardment of Salé (1851), by a French fleet
