= Margallo =

Margallo is a surname. Notable people with the surname include:

- José Manuel García-Margallo (born 1944), Spanish politician
- Juan García y Margallo (1839–1893), Spanish general
- Juan Margallo (1940–2025), Spanish actor, theater director, and dramaturge
