= Treaty of Aranjuez (1780) =

1780 treaty between Spain and Morocco

- Signed: 25 December 1780
- Location: Aranjuez, Spain
- Parties: Spain; Morocco
- Languages: Spanish; Arabic

The Treaty of Aranjuez was signed on December 25, 1780, between Spain and Morocco. Based on the terms of the treaty, Morocco recognized Spanish rule over Melilla. The treaty defused tensions, lessening the chance that Morocco would agree to British requests to declare war on the Spanish, as in 1774.

== Bibliography ==
- Gassió, Xavier (23 September 2018). Sáhara español. El último reemplazo.: Texto completo con imágenes seleccionadas por el autor (in Spanish). Arzalia Ediciones. ISBN 978-84-17241-24-7.

== See also ==
- List of treaties
