= Siege of Asilah (1690–1691) =

- Part of the Spanish-Moroccan conflicts
| Date | 1690 – 1691 |
| Location | Asilah, Morocco |
| Result | Moroccan victory |

Belligerents
| Sultanate of Morocco | Kingdom of Spain |

Commanders and leaders
| (Morocco) Ismail Ibn Sharif (Morocco) Ahmed ben Haddou | (Spain) Unknown |

Strength
| Unknown | Unknown |

Casualties and losses
| Unknown | Unknown |

Between 1690 and 1691, the Moroccans besieged the Spanish-held Asilah for a year before surrendering to the Moroccans.

== Background ==
In the year 1471, the Portuguese captured the city of Asilah from the Moroccans. The Portuguese built walls that surrounded the city. In 1578, the Portuguese king, Sebastian, chose Asilah as his base for his ill-fated campaign in Morocco. In 1589, the city was recaptured by the Moroccans but at some point later the city was captured by the Spanish.

== Siege ==
After the victory at Larache in 1689, the Moroccan Sultan, Ismail Ibn Sharif, dispatched his general, Ahmed ben Haddou, to besiege the city of Asilah, which was held by the Spanish. The Spanish resisted; however, after a year of fighting, they were exhausted and asked to surrender. The Moroccan Riffians agreed for a safe passage on the orders of the Sultan; however, the Spanish didn't trust the Riffians, fearing to suffer the same fate as in Larache. The Spanish left Asilah on ships at night and escaped to Spain. The Riffians entered the city after a siege that had lasted between 1690 and 1691. The Riffians rebuilt Asilah, building two mosques, a madrasa, and a public bath.

== Sources ==
- Ahmad ibn Khalid al-Nasiri (1894), Al-Istiqsa li-Akhbar duwal al-Maghrib al-Aqsa, Vol VII..
- Octave Houdas (1886), Le” Maroc de 1631 a 1812.
- Thurayyā Barrādah (1997), The Moroccan army and its development in the nineteenth century.
