= List of Spanish colonial wars in Morocco =

Spanish-Moroccan conflicts (since 1492):

- Conquest of Melilla (1497)
- Spanish expedition to Tlemcen (1543)
- Blockade of the Tetuan River (1565)
- Capture of La Mámora (1614)
- Siege of Mamora (1681)
- Siege of Larache (1689)
- Siege of Asilah (1690–1691)
- Siege of Oran (1693)
- Siege of Melilla (1694–1696)
- Siege of Melilla (1774–1775)
- Hispano-Moroccan War (1790–1791)
- Hispano-Moroccan War (1859–1860)
- First Melillan campaign (1893–1894)
- Second Melillan campaign (1909–1910)
- Kert campaign (1911–1912)
- Rif War (1920–1927)
- Ifni War (1957–1958)
