= Cession of Larache =

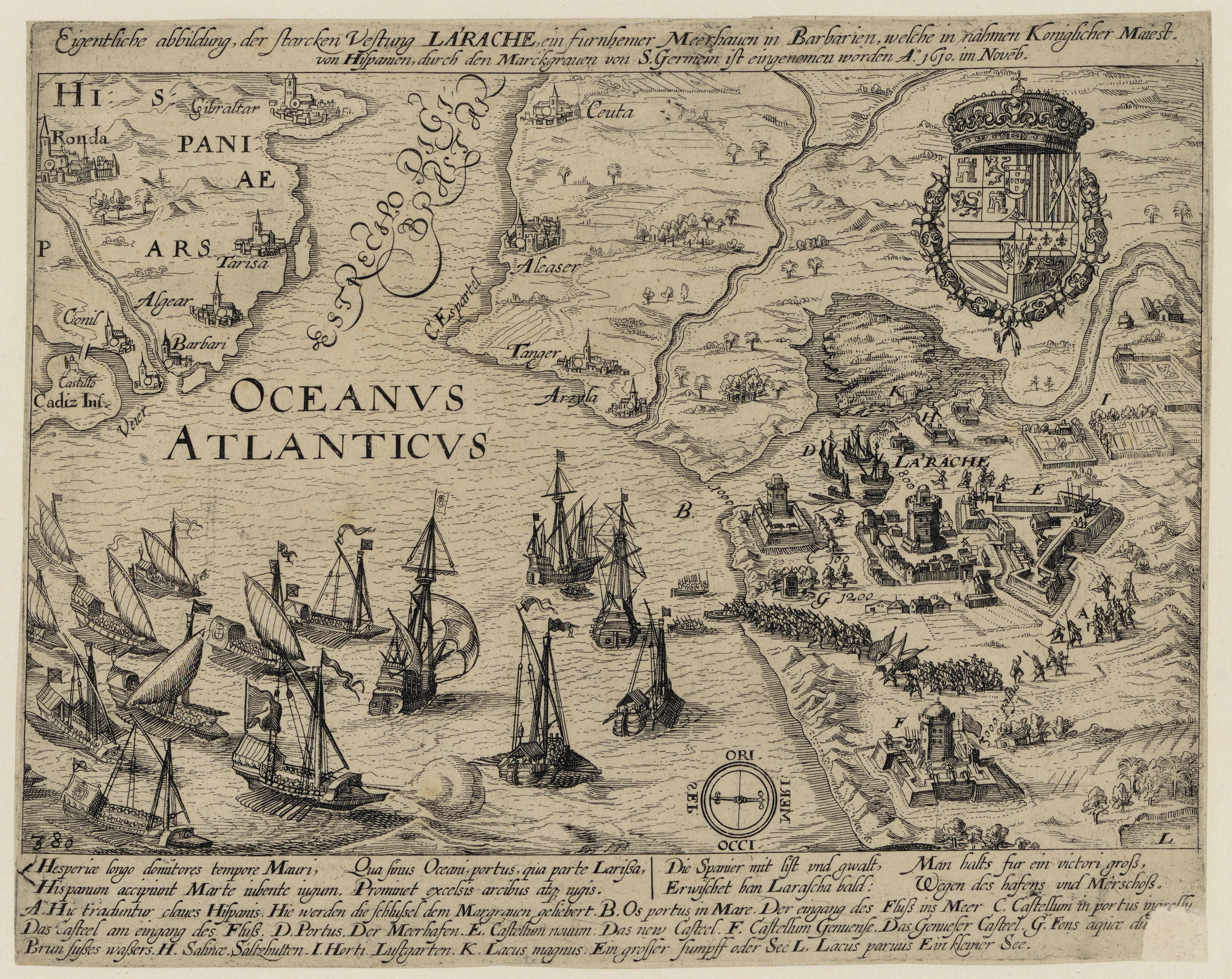
Contemporary map showing the Spanish assuming control

The cession of Larache effectively took place on 20 November 1610, when Juan de Mendoza y Velasco, Marquis of San Germán, assumed control over the North African port of Larache on behalf of the Hispanic Monarchy.

== History ==
The acquisition of Larache by the Hispanic Monarchy had been an important—obsessive—target of the foreign policy of the reign of Philip II. It was, however, eventually deferred to the reign of Philip III. The place was promised by Muhammad al-Shaykh al-Ma'mun in exchange for the Spanish support in the internal struggles of the Saadi sultanate against his brother Zidan Abu Maali.

Álvaro de Bazán, Marquis of Santa Cruz had already tried to occupy the city in 1608. Juan de Mendoza y Velasco, Marquis of San Germán, had himself led another unsuccessful attempt in the past. In November 1610, the Marquis was invited to take possession of the city by Mohammed esh Sheikh el Mamun, who left Spain before the Marquis to prepare for the latter's arrival to Larache, meeting in Tangier. The Marquis of San Germán, who brought a contingent of troops of about 3,000 infantrymen in the galleys of Pedro de Toledo, took possession of the port on 20 November 1610, meeting no hostilities .

Larache would remain under Spanish control until 1689, when it was seized by the troops of the Alaouite sultan Ismail Ibn Sharif.
