= Manuel Cassola =

Spanish general and politician

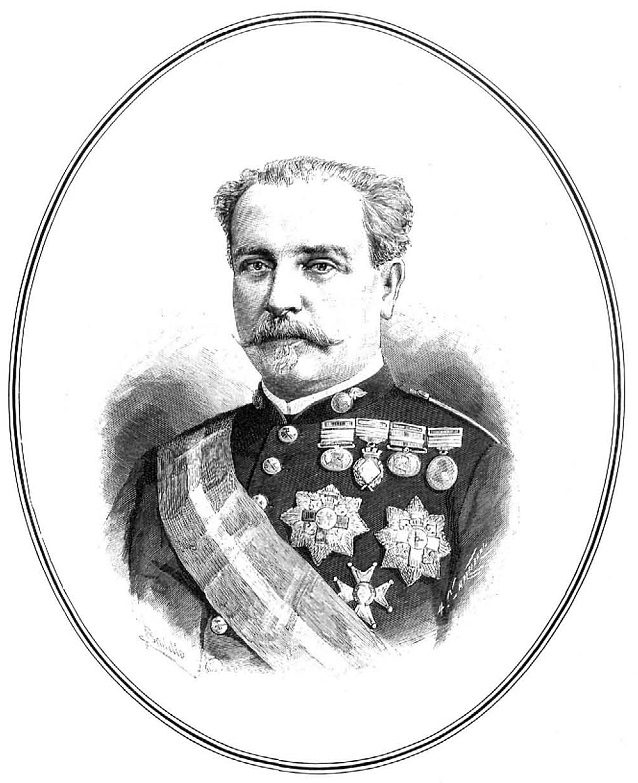

Minister of War
- In office March 1887 – June 1888
- Preceded by: Ignacio María del Castillo
- Succeeded by: Thomás O'Ryan

Deputy in Cortes
- In office 1876–1890
- Constituency: Cartagena

Personal details
- Born: 27 August 1838 Hellín, Spain
- Died: 10 May 1890 (aged 51) Madrid, Spain
- Resting place: Cementerio de San Justo
- Education: Infantry College of Toledo
- Occupation: Military officer, politician

Military service
- Rank: Lieutenant General
- Battles/wars: Santo Domingo Campaign; Ten Years' War; Third Carlist War; Cantonal rebellion

Manuel Cassola y Fernández (27 August 1838–10 May 1890) was a Spanish general and politician. He served as Minister of War from 1887 to 1889.

== Biography ==
=== Early life and formation ===
Born on 27 August 1838 in Hellín, son to a school teacher and a housewife who also earned a living selling clothes.

He entered the Infantry College of Toledo in December 1852 as cadet, graduating as Second lieutenant in June 1856. He received his baptism by fire at the events of July 1856 in Madrid, earning the 1st class of the Cross of St. Ferdinand. He was promoted to lieutenant in August 1857.

=== In the Americas ===
Destined to Cuba, he enlisted to join the expeditionary division led by General Prim in Mexico in 1862, although he ended up staying in Cuba. He was later destined to Santo Domingo, and took part in the attack and occupation of Santiago de los Caballeros, retreat from Puerto Plata, and military operations in San Cristóbal, Baní and Azúa, assault and defence of Monte Christi and other, earning the rank of captain. He worked as lecturer of Geometry and Topography at the Havana Military Academy, and, when the Yara insurrection broke out, kickstarting the deadly Cuban campaign, he mobilized a small force of volunteers under the name of Primera Guerrilla Volante. At the helm of said force, Cassola took part in many military operations, including La Mercedes, Santa Gertrudis, Sancti Spíritus or Meloncitos, until falling ill at the vanguard line of the Trocha from Morón to Júcaro. He then returned to the mainland in December 1871, with the rank of Lieutenant Colonel and with a red plaque of Military Merit.

=== Third Carlist War and Cantonal rebellion ===
Destined to the infantry regiment of Cantabria, he moved to the northern provinces of the Iberian Peninsula in December 1872, fighting against Carlist forces that had risen in arms in Navarre, taking part in the combat at Lacunza's bridge on 29 December 1872. He was subsequently promoted to colonel, taking part in ensuing operations, until falling ill in May 1873. He then returned to Madrid. He served as director of the Artillery Park and as member of the Army's organizational junta, earning the white plaque of Military Merit. He took part in the siege of Cartagena at the helm of the Galicia regiment, since the beginning of the operations until the surrender of the place on 13 January 1874. He took the same regiment to Catalonia and the North, assisting in the Somorrostro battles, until occupying the place of Montellano, thus easening the link between the forces of the Marquis of Duero and the Duke of la Torre.

He later occupied the places of Triano and Galdamés, forcing the retreat of the Carlists on 1 May and the entry of the Armed Forces to Bilbao on 2 May. He was promoted to Brigadier general and appointed to the first brigade of Biscay, taking the town of Munguía by surprise, and holding a combat between Urbe and Legina on 9 July. He later led the second brigade, occupying the town of Algorta and managing the military operations of Nocedal, Monte Curendi, Berango and others. He was given then control of the brigade of operations of Guadalajara, and later another part of the forces of "Centro", taking part in combats in Campillo de Alto Buey, Huélamo and Muela de Chert, siege and surrender of Cantavieja, Sanahuja, Montanicell, Torá, Ardévol and Tremp. He took his brigade to Navarre, occupying Oteiza and Monte Esquinza. Appointed as Commander General of the division of Biscay in January 1876, he contributed to the success in the combats taking part in Santa Águeda and Elgueta, earning military decorations.

=== Second spell in Cuba ===
In October 1876 he returned to Cuba, appointed as Commander General of the Villas Occidentales. He assumed the military and civilian command of the Central Department of the island of Cuba. He unrelentlessly harassed the rebels, personally directing a number of notable combats and military operations. Rebels asked for a suspension of hostilities, a precursor of the general peace.

=== Later life ===
He was promoted to Lieutenant General on 9 May 1878.

He was appointed to the Captaincy-General of Granada in March 1879.

He was elected member of the Congress of Deputies in representation of Cartagena. He was appointed Director–General of Artillery in August 1883. He replaced General Castillo as Minister of War in March 1887, as part of a Sagasta cabinet. During his ministerial tenure (8 March 1887 – 14 June 1888), Cassola proposed a huge pack of modernizing reforms, straying away from the army-militia dualism. The proposed reforms generated important discussion on defence issues.

Since his exit from the government in 1888, he has lived in Madrid as deputy in representation of Cartagena.

He died on 10 May 1890 in Madrid. He was buried the next day at the Sacramental de San Justo.
