= Larache expedition =

1765 war between France and Morocco

Coordinates: 35°11′N 6°9′W

Expedition of Larache
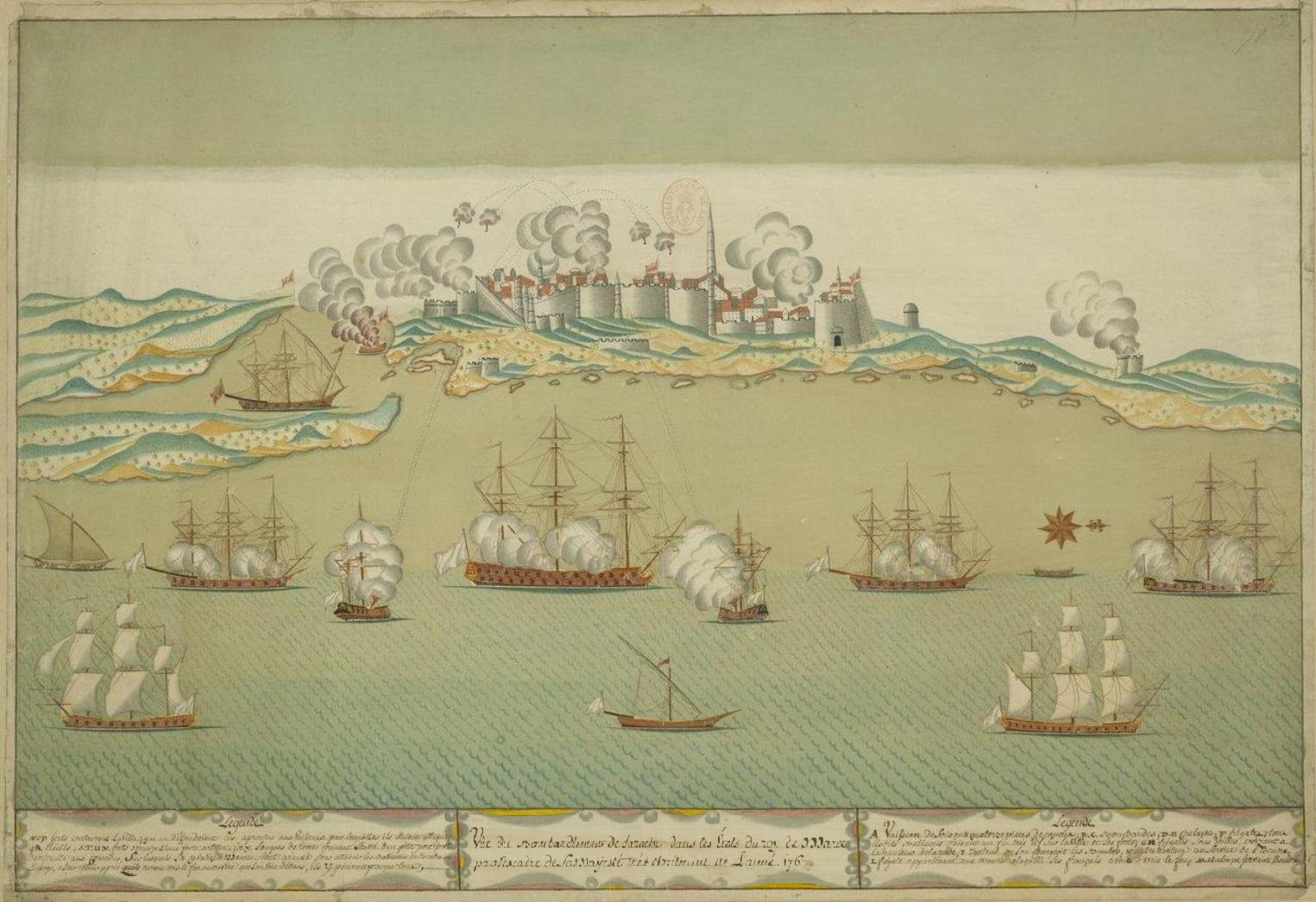
Date	25–28 June 1765
Location	Larache, Morocco
Result	Moroccan victory

Belligerents
Kingdom of France	Sultanate of Morocco

Commanders and leaders
Duchaffault de Besné	Mohammed III

Strength
16 warships Several vessels	Unknown

Casualties and losses
200 killed 49 captured 300 lost 7 ships captured	30 killed

The Expedition of Larache occurred in June 1765 when French Navy Marines attempted to invade the Moroccan city of Larache following a bombardment of Salé and Rabat. It is an example of the sporadic failure of Western arms against local forces in colonial campaigns.

== Background ==
After the end of the Seven Years' War, France turned its attention to the Barbary corsairs, especially those of Morocco, who had taken advantage of the conflict to attack European shipping.

The city of Larache had already experienced a siege in 1689 which ended with the capture of the city by the Moroccans commanded by the Moroccan sultan Ismail ibn Sharif. The Spaniards had been present in the city since 1610 but this offensive made it possible to drive them out without forgetting that several other cities were taken over during the same period including Tangier and Mehdya.

Just before the bombardment, the same squadron that took part in the bombardment of Larache launched a raid on Salé because their corsairs were taking a lot of the French merchant ships. The raid started on 31 May 1765 when Louis-Charles de Besné anchored his ship in front of Salé and bombarded the city from 2 June to 11 June, but the bombs could not reach the privateers and therefore the French began their journey to Mehdya on 17 June. Because there was only one building in the port, Duchaffault decided to bomb another place. On 21 June, the French set off towards Larache.

The bombardment of Salé occurred because France and Morocco had been negotiating peace for several years, of which there were several preliminary negotiations and proposals on both sides. But as the proposals of the sultan of Morocco were chimerical and difficulties followed one another. The French decided to cancel the negotiations for the moment since the Moroccan corsairs were putting a lot of hold on French trade.

== Expedition ==
=== Beginning of the expedition ===
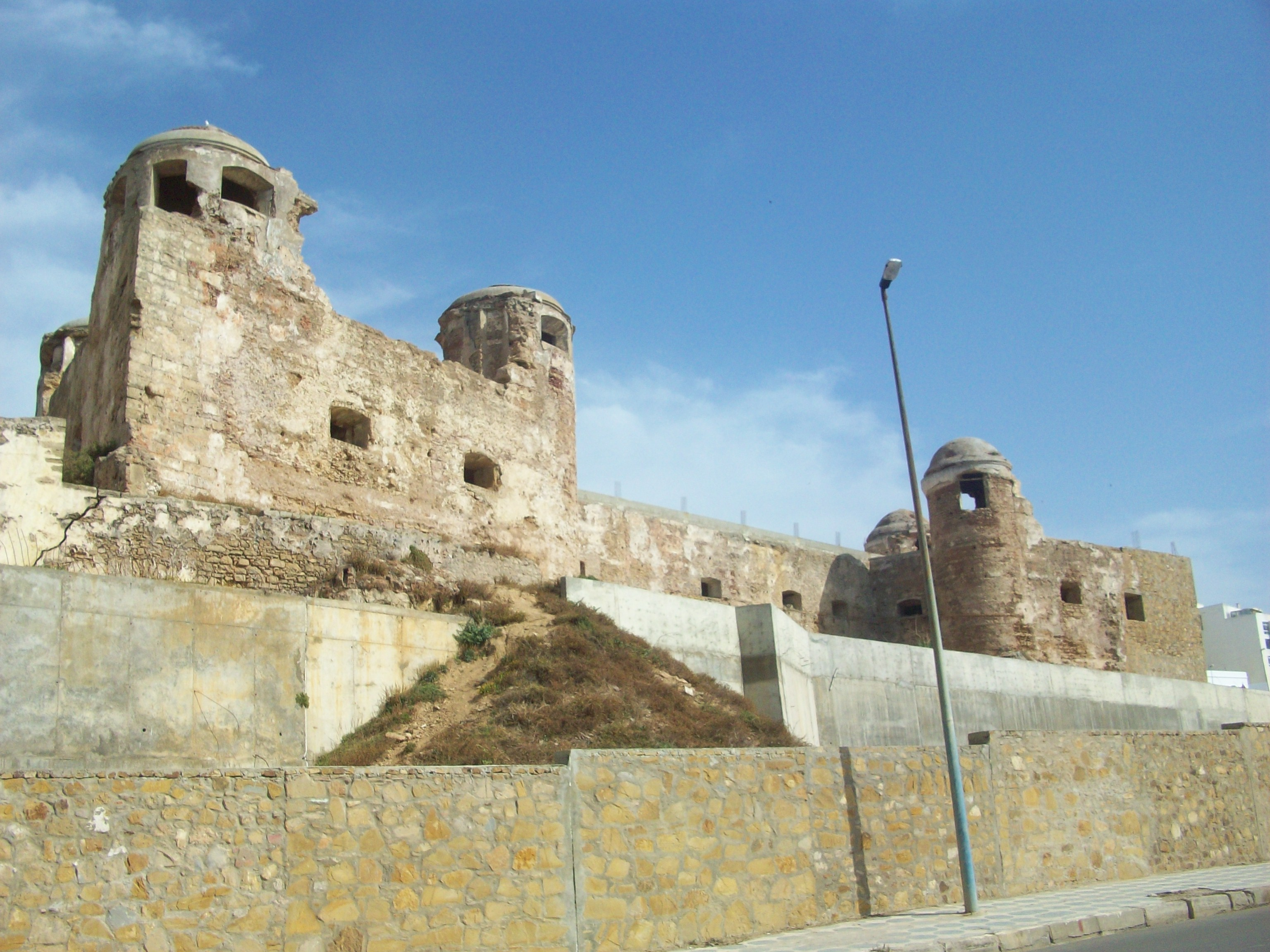
Fortress of Larache attacked by a French fleet in June 1765.

A French squadron was led by Duchaffault de Besné, comprising a 52-gun ship Utile and 15 frigates, xebecs and galliots. The 30-gun Héroine was commanded by Captain De Grasse. The xebec Singe was under the command of Pierre André de Suffren de Saint Tropez.

On 25 June 1765, the French arrived in front of Larache at around three in the afternoon. Several Moroccan ships were in the port, including a fully armed one at the entrance to the river. The French force were very well positioned and could destroy the ship. It was decided that the destruction of the ship would take place in the evening. A few ships were sent to attack a fortified castle as a diversion while the rest of the fleet attempted to enter the port, but due to heavy seas and conditions, the attack was postponed until the next day.

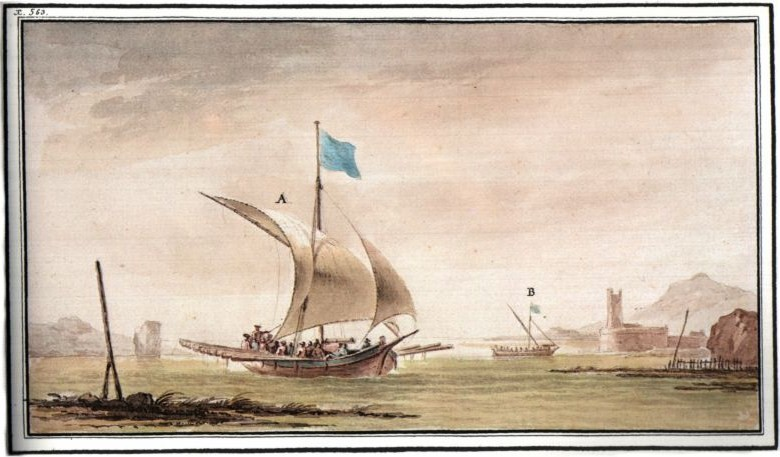
An armed rowboat during the bombardment of Larache.

On 26 June 1765, the French squadron succeeded in destroying Moroccan fortifications and batteries which could not retaliate. The French succeeded in entering the river and setting fire to a Moroccan ship which was in the port.

On the night of 26 June to 27 June 1765, after launching two expeditions in which Larache was bombarded, Duchaffault decided to detach eight longboats to set fire to a Moroccan vessel which was at the entrance to the river. The expedition was a semi-failure since the French succeeded in setting fire to the ship approached without opposition, only one man was injured during the operation. When the longboats rejoined the vessels, the French saw that the Moroccans quickly stopped the fire and that the operation was unnecessary. According to Maurville, the French forces were ready to make another attempt but the lack of water in the river made it impossible to get the ships through. The tide was also one of the factors that helped repel the attempt.

=== Defeat of the French ===
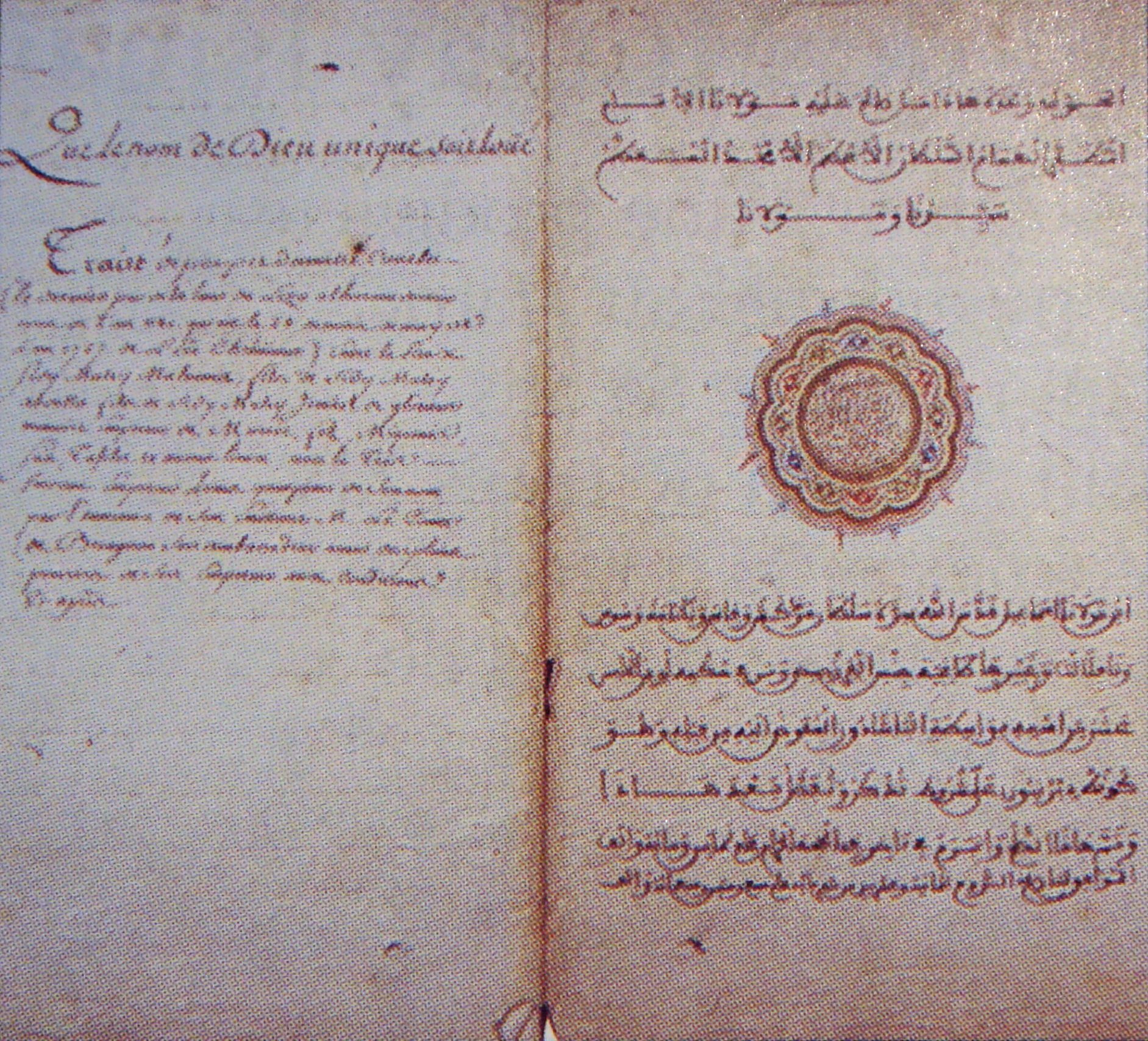
Commercial treaty signed by Mohammed ben Abdallah with France in 1767.

All the officers seeing Duchaffault's situation, they suggested that he should carry out a new expedition in broad daylight. However, the general did not want to decide anything without having consulted the captains of the other ships of his squadron. In the morning of June 27, he signals to all the commanders of the other ships to go on board. After having consulted them, he learned that all had the same idea of a new expedition. He then ordered the captain of each ship to join his board and arm the rowboats and canoes and to be ready for the signal that will be given to join the rowboats of his ship. He also asks the captains to set sail as close as possible to the entrance of the port, while Duchaffault's vessel does the same. Thus the frigates, the bombers and the chébecs begin to bombard the town of Larache until noon, they stop at lunch time, then start again from two hours.

At four o'clock, Duchaffault gave the order to give the signal to the boats and canoes to come on board, they went there immediately. Latouche de Beauregard was in charge of the expedition. Duchaffault also named the longboats which will participate in the destruction of the buildings which were in the port and formed other divisions intended to provide support.

The new operation began, the longboats arrived on the bar, and during the trip in the river pass, several forts were bombarded. As the longboats continued to advance, several Moroccans vessels hidden behind the rocks that line the entrance and interior of the river revealed themselves. The French troops then opened fire on the Moroccan troops. After being approached, the Moroccan ships encircled the French.

Seven French boats were captured, while nine were able to return to the squadron. 200 troops were killed, and 48 were captured. According to Lewis, 300 troops were lost. One of the captives, Bidé de Maurville, who remained in captivity for two years, wrote in 1775 an account of the expedition, in Relation de l'affaire de Larache.

== Aftermath ==
The operation ended in a French failure with 200 of their men killed and 49 captured while the Moroccans only lost 30. According to Lewis, 300 French were lost.

The captured men are said to have participated in the construction of the city of Essaouira, which was being designed by Théodore Cornut for the sultan of Morocco, Mohammed ben Abdallah.

The fleet was unable to recover the prisoners or to inflict retribution on Moroccan forces. This was a low point for the French Navy, after the Seven Years' War, and before the revival of the French fleet at the end of the 18th century.

The defeat at Larache led to a truce and a treaty between France and Morocco in 1767, with terms which were nevertheless favourable to French trade. (Note: "The defeat of the French forces in Larache in 1765 did not prevent Muhammad III from proposing a truce and pressing for the conclusion of a treaty of peace, which was only signed in 1767 and which was "very advantageous to French trade"")

== See also ==
- France–Morocco relations
- Siege of Larache (1689)
- Mohammed ben Abdallah
