= Thomás O'Ryan y Vázquez =

Spanish general (1821–1902)

Lieutenant general Tomás O'Ryan Vázquez
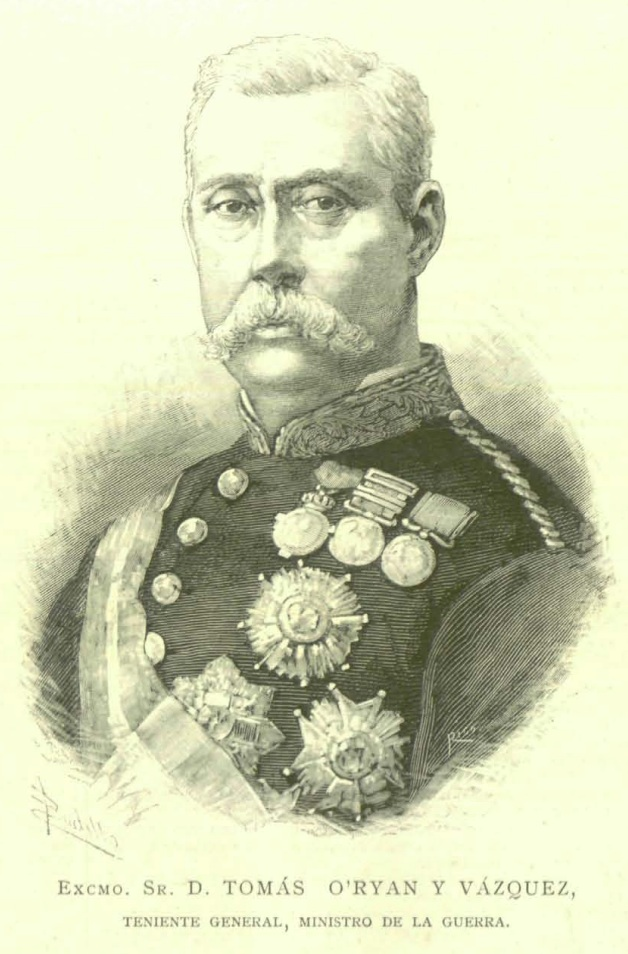
- Tomás O'Ryan y Vázquez
- Born: 30 March 1821; Madrid, Spain
- Died: 2 August 1902 (aged 81); Madrid, Spain
- Military career
- Allegiance: (Restoration (Spain)) Spain
- Branch: Spanish Army
- Service years: 1851–1888
- Rank: Lieutenant general
- Conflicts: Lopez Expedition Hispano-Moroccan War (1859–1860): Battle of Samsa; Battle of Wad Ras; Glorious Revolution (Spain)

Minister of War of Spain
- In office 16 June – 11 December 1888
- Monarch: Alfonso XII
- Regent: Maria Christina of Austria
- Prime Minister: Antonio Cánovas del Castillo
- Preceded by: Manuel Cassola
- Succeeded by: José Chinchilla

Governor of Melilla
- In office 10 July 1863 – 14 March 1864
- Monarch: Isabella II
- Prime Minister: Manuel de Pando, 6th Marquis of Miraflores; Lorenzo Arrazola; Alejandro Mon y Menéndez
- Minister of War: José Gutiérrez de la Concha; Francisco Lersundi Hormaechea; José María Marchessi y Oleaga
- Preceded by: Manuel Álvarez Maldonaldo
- Succeeded by: Bartolomé Benavides y Campuzano

Thomás O'Ryan y Vázquez (1821, in Madrid – 1902) was a Spanish military Lieutenant General, Minister of War, and Professor at the Academy of Military Engineering in Guadalajara, Spain. He was of Irish descent.

== Military career ==
O´Ryan took part in the Spanish Revolution in 1848. He also fought in Cuba, aged around 30, participating in the defeat of the second attempt at maritime invasion by the Venezuelan filibuster Narciso López (1797 – executed 1851), who had been helped with exiles, mercenaries and money by United States Governor John A. Quitman of Mississippi (1797–1858), former Senator John Henderson of Mississippi (1797–1857) and the editor of the New Orleans Delta, Laurence Sigur, contravening the Spain–USA neutrality conventions operative since 1818. Quitman, Henderson and others were tried by a tribunal in the United States but were finally acquitted.

=== Crimean War ===
O´Ryan was a military attaché in 1855, as a Lieutenant Colonel, aged 34, and was invited by the General Headquarters of the French - British Army at the Crimean War against Russia to write an account of the war. He did this together with his assistant Lieutenant of the Military Engineers Corp, Andres Villalon Hechebarria, deceased in 1885 as a Brigadier of the Spanish Army, who participated in military campaigns in Africa, Mexico and the Philippine Islands.

They wrote a most interesting account of the Crimean War in 3 volumes, namely: Memorias sobre el viaje militar a La Crimea, presentada por los oficiales del Cuerpo de Ingenieros nombrados en 1855 para seguir y estudiar las operaciones de la Guerra entre Rusia y las potencias occidentales de Francia e Inglaterra auxiliando a la Turquía. Madrid, Imprenta Memorial Engineers (Reports on the military journey to the Crimea, by officers of the Corps of Engineers appointed in 1855 to monitor and study the operations of the War between Russia and the Western powers France and England, in support of Turkey.).

== Further career ==
In 1859 he was commissioned as a Colonel to witness the Italian War.

He was a Governor of Melilla (1864–1866). He was a personal aide of King Alfonso XII of Spain (1857 - King under a coup d'état in 1875–1885), Minister of War in the Cabinet of Prime Minister Praxedes Mateo Sagasta and General Director of the Infantry Corps.

== Bibliography ==
O´Ryan wrote in Spanish, Guerra de Oriente (1854 a 1856). Conferencias dadas en el Centro del Ejército y de la Armada by General Don Tomás O´Ryan y Vázquez (East War (1854 to 1856). Lectures given to the Army and Navy.). Madrid, Imprenta Memorial Engineers (1886).

He published in 1856, in vol. 11, of the Imprenta Memorial Engineers, (Madrid), a 360 pages treatise with 36 deployable designs, a translation of the German work by the Austrian Julius von Wurmb Tratado de Arquitectura Militar (Treatise on Military Architecture).

He wrote some treatises on military engineering.

== Honours ==
He received the "Legion d'Honneur" medal in France, the Portuguese medal of the "Order of the Concepcion de Villaviciosa", the medal of "San Maurizio e San Lazaro" in Italy and the "Order of the Medjidie" from Turkey.
