= Juan García y Margallo =

Spanish general and governor

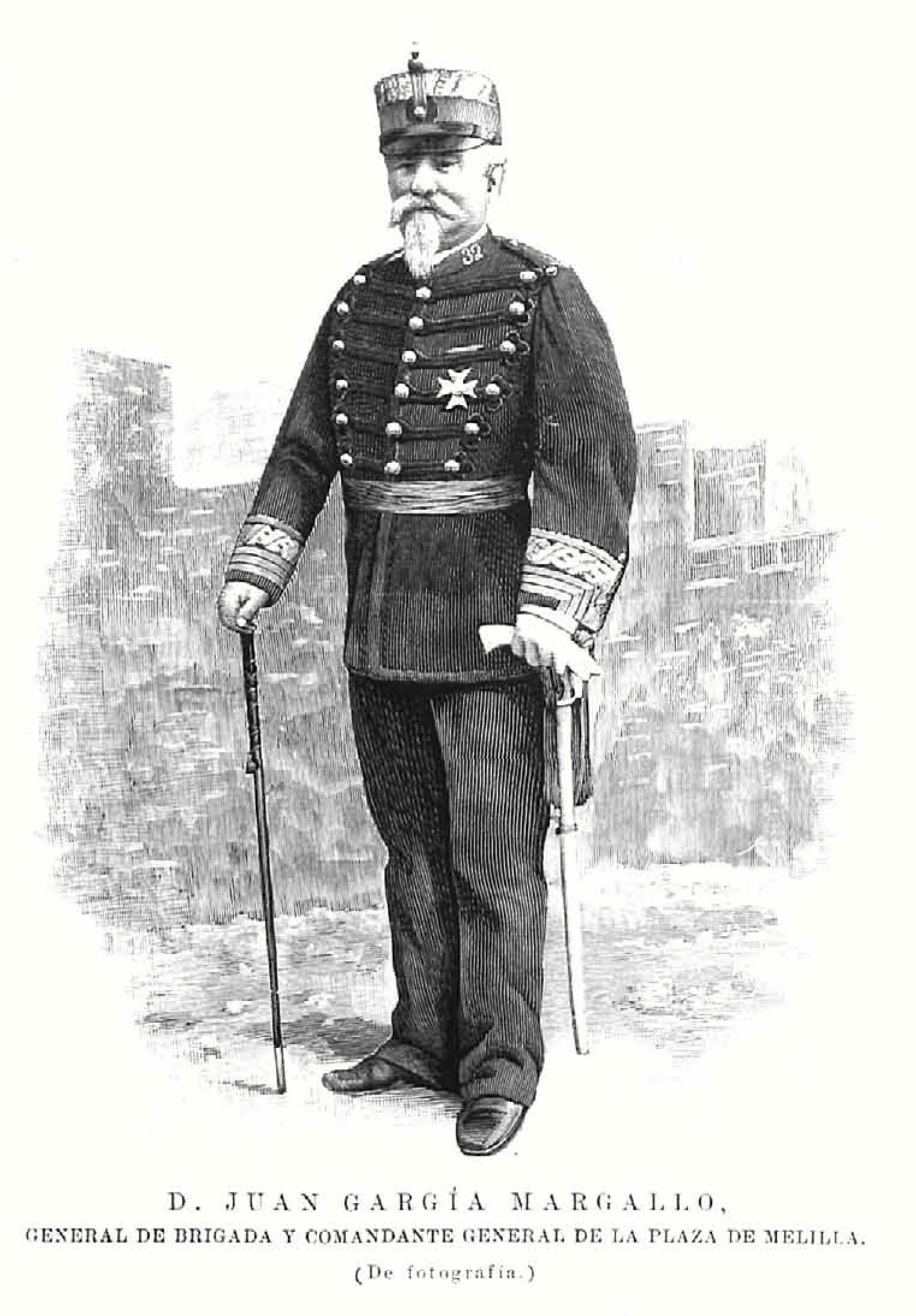
Picture of Juan García Margallo published in La Ilustración Española y Americana, October 22, 1893

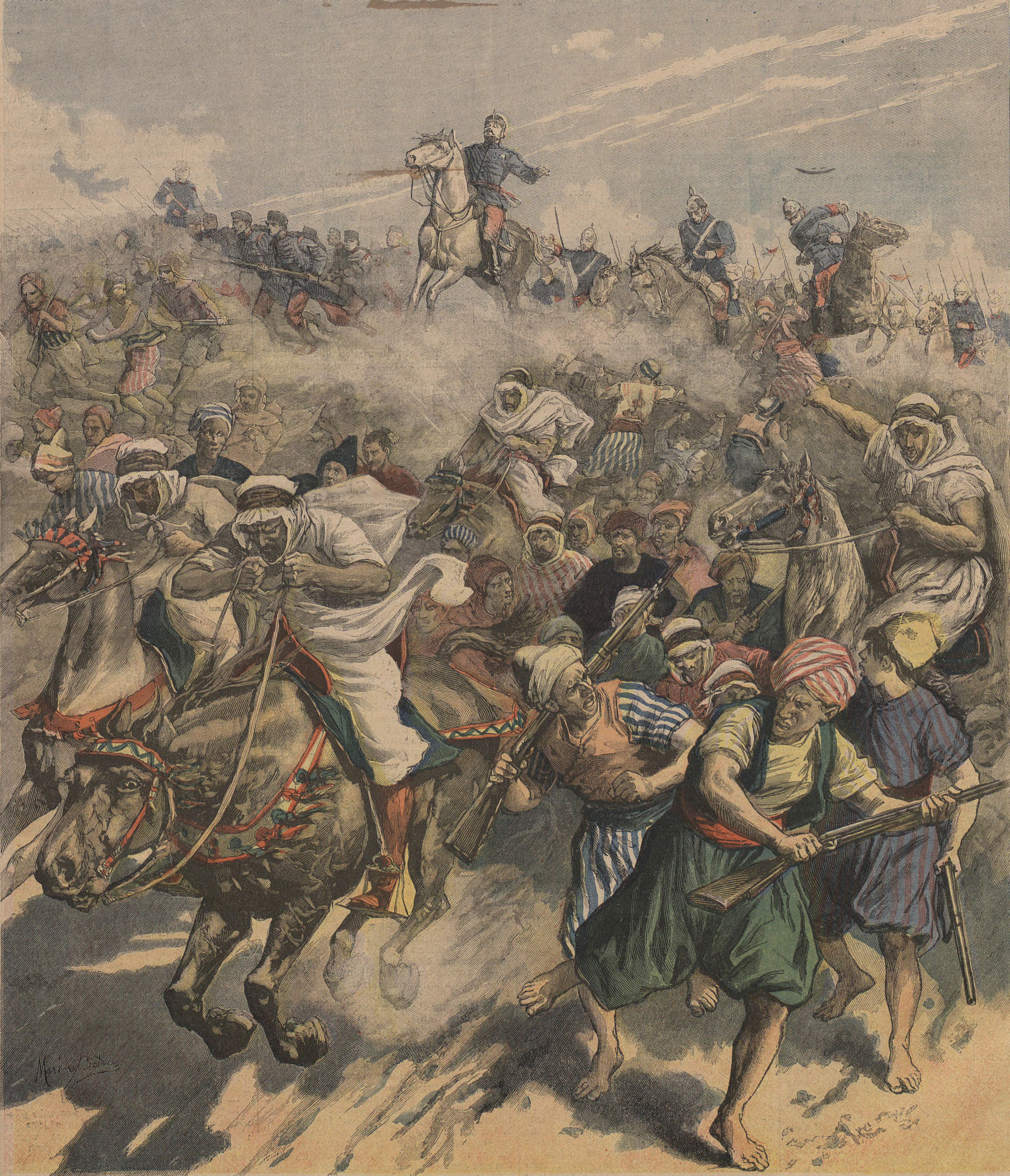
Illustration of the death of García Margallo in Le Petit Journal, 13 November 1893.

Juan García y Margallo (12 July 1839 – 28 October 1893) was a Spanish governor of Melilla (1891–93) and general who was defeated and killed during the Rif War, which is also called the Margallo War after him. He is the great-grandfather of Spanish diplomat and former Minister of Foreign Affairs José Manuel García-Margallo.
