= Fuerte de Cabrerizas Altas =

Fortification in Melilla, Spain

Coordinates: 35.3056°N 2.9599°W

Fort of Cabrerizas Altas
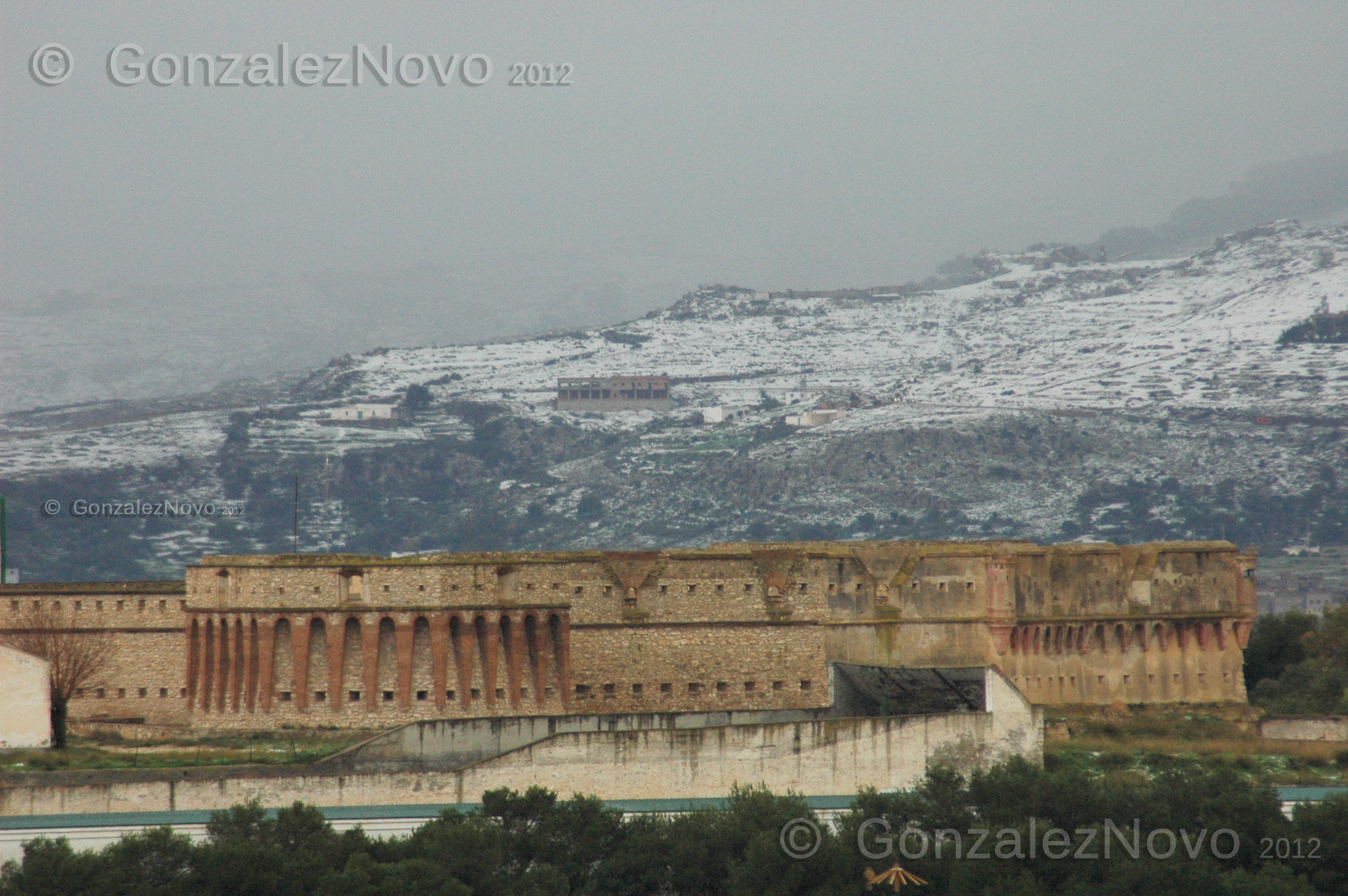
- Interactive map of Fort of Cabrerizas Altas
- Type: Bien de Interés Cultural, in the category of Monument
- Location: Melilla, Spain

History
- Built: 19th century
- Event: Declared as Bien de Interés Cultural on November 29, 1990.

The Fuerte de Cabrerizas Altas is an outer fort of the Spanish city of Melilla, a Bien de Interés Cultural that houses the Museum of La Legion.

== History ==
It was built between May 1, 1890, and December 1, 1893, to protect the road to Cabrerizas.

== Description ==
It is a neo-medieval style fort, with a polygonal plan with three rectilinear fronts interrupted by two pentagonal bastions, located opposite each other, one in the southwest end and the other in the northeast end.

=== Museum of La Legión ===
It offers a journey through the history of the corps, with special emphasis on everyday objects, photographs, flags, pennants, etc.
