= Siege of La Mamora (1681) =

1681 siege of Spanish fortress

Siege of Mamora (1681)
- Part of the Spanish-Moroccan conflicts
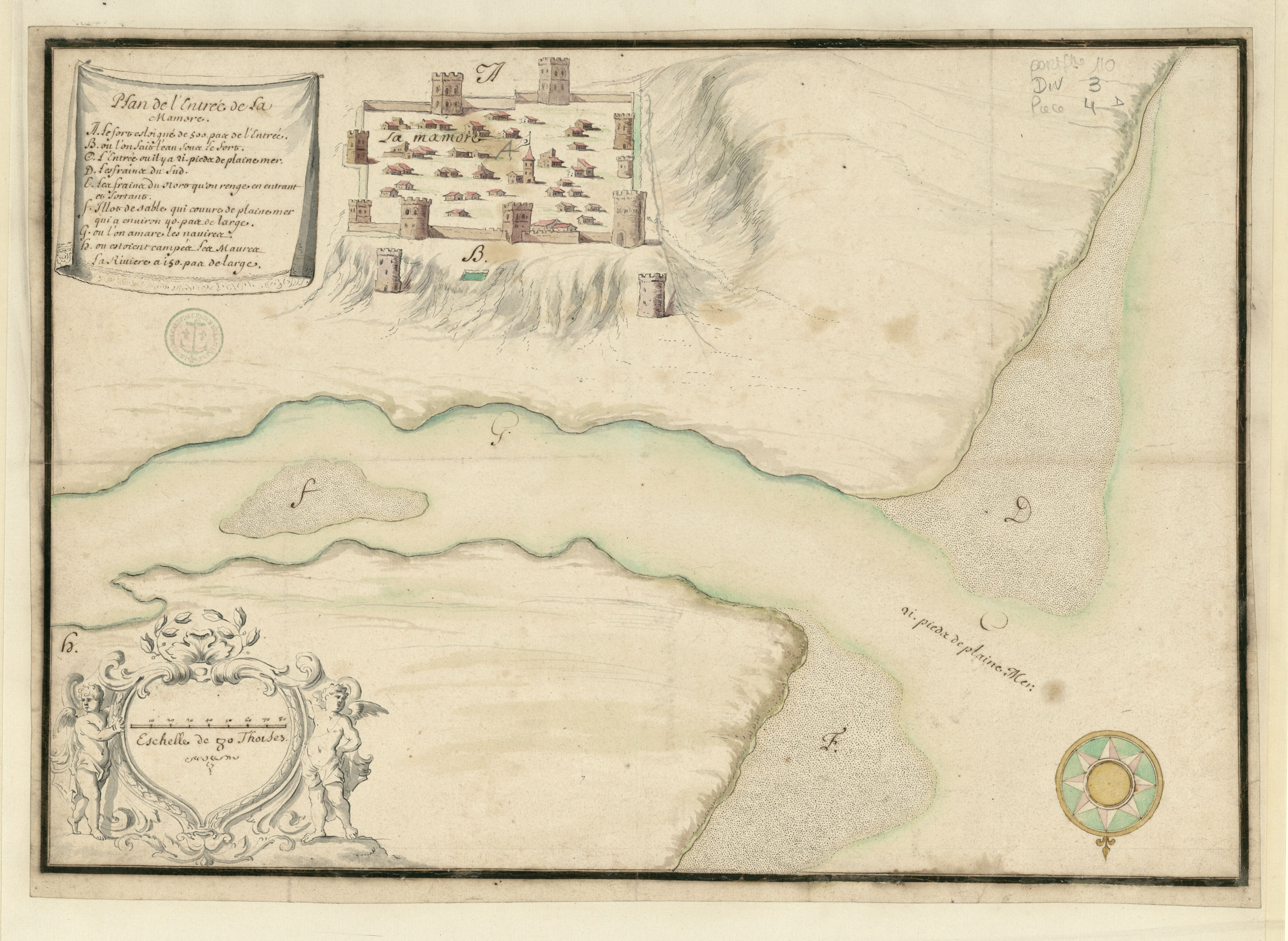
- Fortress of Mamora
Date	3 May 1681
Location	Mehdya, Morocco
Result	Moroccan victory

Belligerents
Sultanate of Morocco	Kingdom of Spain

Commanders and leaders
(Morocco) Ismail Ibn Sharif (Morocco) Omar bin Haddou	(Spain) Juan de Peñalosa y Estrada (POW)

Strength
Unknown	Unknown

Casualties and losses
Unknown	309 captured 103 cannons captured

The siege of Mamora was a military operation launched in 1681 by Sultan Moulay Ismail with the aim of taking the place of Mamora, which had been occupied by the Spanish since 1614. The Moroccan forces eventually captured the Spanish fortress.

== Background ==
On 1-2 August 1614 a Spanish fleet commanded by Luis Fajardo captured Mamora. He fortified the town and left a good number of garrisons there. He then returned to Cádiz. The Moroccans attempted to recapture the lost city in 1628 and 1647; however, all of their attempts were failures. In 1680, the Moroccan sultan, Ismail Ibn Sharif, was busy with the siege of Tangier, so he dispatched Omar bin Haddou to capture Mamora.

== Siege ==
A large number of Moroccans besieged the city of Mamora and kept the garrison in suspense. Omar's plan was to break the garrison's spirit with a swift attack on their outer defenses and offer the garrison the option of surrender or death. First, Omar established spiked palisades, which stretched from the city walls to the river banks. As soon as night fell, Omar attacked and managed to capture two towers on the shore. Omar knew that the Spanish garrison was low in morale, so he offered the garrison commander, Juan de Peñalosa y Estrada, a promise not to be enslaved. Juan refused and insisted everyone fight, but his soldiers refused to obey, forcing him to accept the offer.

The Moroccan commander invited the Sultan to witness the fall of the city. On 3 May the city fell, and the Sultan watched his men capture the city. The Spanish commander was taken prisoner along with 308 men. 88 bronze cannons and 15 iron cannons have been captured, along with a large quantity of ammunition. Juan was forced to kneel and kiss the sultan's feet. The Sultan then entered the citadel of Mamora. The city was renamed Mehdya. The statue of Jesus was looted, and the sultan built a mosque, a madrasa, and an inn.

== Sources ==
- Ernest Mercier (1891), Histoire de l'Afrique septentrionale (Berbérie) dupuis les temps les plus reculés jusqu'à la conquête française (1830), Vol-III.
- Revue africaine, journal des travaux de la Société Historique Algérienne, Vol-XVII.
- Jeremy Black (2022), A Brief History of the Atlantic.
- Giles Milton (2012), White Gold.
