= Siege of Melilla (1774–1775) =

Conflict between Spain and Morocco

Coordinates: 35°18′N 2°57′W

- Part of the Spanish-Moroccan conflicts and Spanish-Barbary Wars
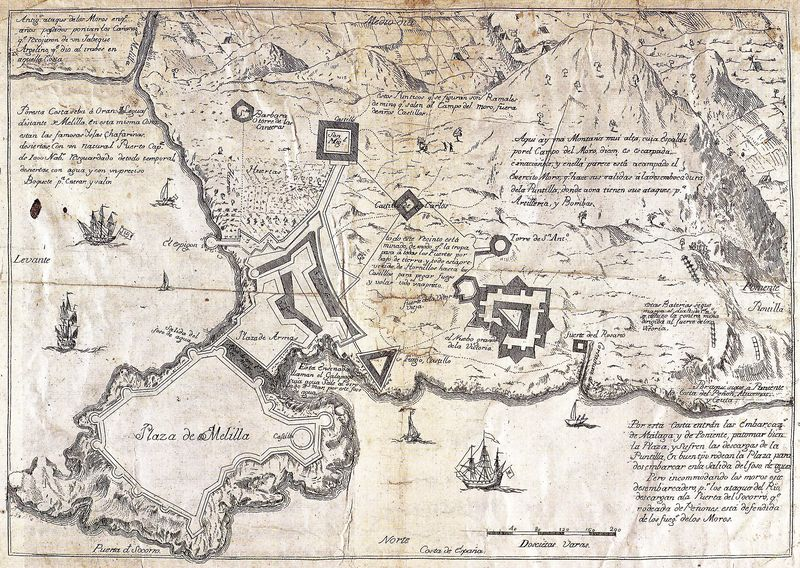
- The Plaza of Melilla during the siege.
Date	9 December 1774 – 19 March 1775
Location	Melilla, Peñón de Vélez de la Gomera
Result	Spanish victory; Treaty of Aranjuez

Belligerents
Kingdom of Spain	Sultanate of Morocco

Commanders and leaders
(Spain) Juan Sherlock (Spain) Florencio Moreno	(Morocco) Mohammed III (Morocco) Tahar Fenis

Strength
(Spain) 5,000	30,000–40,000

Casualties and losses
600 killed or wounded	Unknown

The siege of Melilla was an attempt by the Sultanate of Morocco, supported by Algerian mercenaries, to capture the Spanish fortress of Melilla on the Moroccan Mediterranean coast. Mohammed ben Abdallah, then Sultan of Morocco, invaded Melilla in December 1774 with a large army of Royal Moroccan soldiers and Algerian mercenaries. The city was defended by a small garrison under Irish-born Governor Don Juan Sherlocke until the siege was lifted by a relief fleet in March 1775.

== Background ==
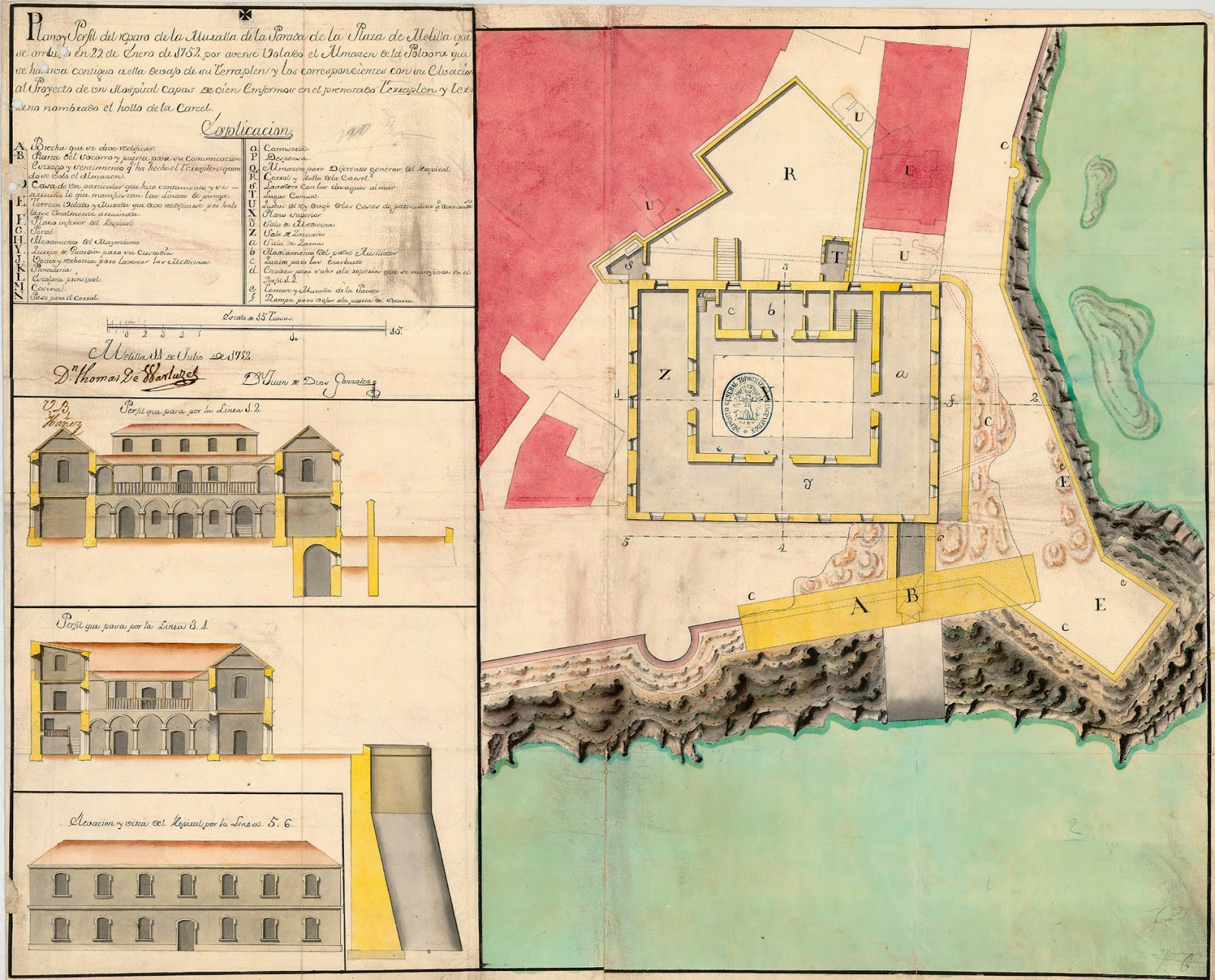
Melilla in 1752.

In 1773, the Sultan Mohammed III sent the artillery commander Sidi Tahar Fenis as ambassador to Great Britain to acquire military equipment. On September 19, 1774, he sent a letter to Charles III with this matter, saying that peace between them could only be by sea. Therefore, Charles III declared war on the sultanate on 23 October 1774. Then the governor of Melilla was José Carrión de Andrade. In the city, there was a scarce garrison, which consisted of the fixed regiment of Melilla, with the companies commanded by the captains Antonio Manso and Vicente de Alva, and detachments for the handling of the old iron artillery pieces.

Between September and October 1774, a commission made up of the field marshal Luis Urbina Caneja, the engineer Luis Caballero (who was later during the siege) and the engineer commander Luis Ailmen, was in Melilla to prepare a report on defensive improvements in the square.

Charles III ordered to reinforce the defenses of Ceuta and Oran, due to a possible Ottoman attack. At the end of November, the Spanish learned that the Sultan had planned to conquer Melilla.

To reinforce the defense, Charles III sent Juan Sherlock to Melilla as commander and reinforced the garrison.

== Siege ==
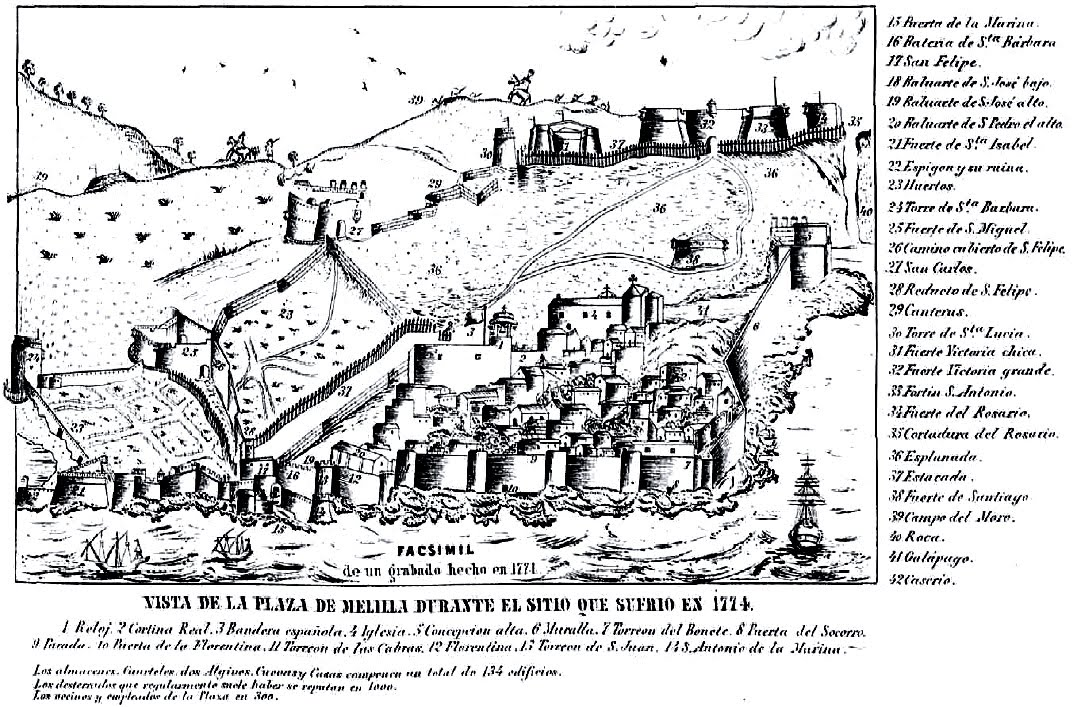
Engraving of the siege, 1774.

Mohammed ben Abdallah assembled an army of 30,000 to 40,000 men and powerful artillery in 1774 and began a bombardment of Melilla.

Juan Sherlock sent the mariner Juan Trinquini to Malaga to request reinforcements from Andalusia. On 11 December, a French ship arrived in Melilla with reinforcements from the peninsula. The ship left the city on 16 December with part of the civilian population. For defense, 117 new guns and mortars were installed. Tomás de Find, Charles III's major artilleryman, took charge of the maintenance of the artillery. Two Spanish squads, commanded by Antonio Barceló and José Hidalgo de Cisneros, blocked the Strait of Gibraltar to prevent Great Britain from supplying weapons and ammunition to the Muslim troops. A small garrison under Florencio Moreno likewise resisted the Sultan's army at Peñón de Vélez de la Gomera.

In 1775, war material promised from Britain was intercepted en route to Melilla and captured by the Spanish Navy. Spanish sail approached the beleaguered city. At the same time the Turks of the Ottoman Empire began to encroach on Morocco's eastern borders.

Spanish troops resisted the attack over a period of 100 days, over which time some 12,000 projectiles were lobbed onto the city. Sherlocke began to break the siege, a situation exacerbated by the desertion of ben Abdallah's Algerians. The siege ended on 19 March.

== Aftermath ==
There was a meeting between Juan Sherlock and the diplomat Hamed al-Gazel, where he told him that the Sultan wanted to maintain friendly relations and resume trade under more advantageous conditions than in the previous treaty. On 20 December 1777, Morocco recognised the United States as an independent nation. With the Peace of Aranjuez in 1780, Morocco recognized Spanish rule over the remainder of Melilla, with trade relations being opened between the two nations.

== Bibliography ==
- Rezette, Robert (1976). The Spanish Enclaves in Morocco. Nouvelles Editions Latines Publishing.
- Fernández, Manuela (2017). "La guerra justa y la declaración de guerra a Marruecos de 1774" (PDF). Norba / Revista de Historía [Elektronische Ressource] (in Spanish). Norba Historia. ISSN 0213-375X.
- Domínguez, Constantino (1993). Melillerías: paseos por la historia de Melilla (siglos XV a XX) (in Spanish). Ayuntamiento de Melilla. ISBN 848729135X.
- Gassió, Xavier (23 September 2018). Sáhara español. El último reemplazo.: Texto completo con imágenes seleccionadas por el autor (in Spanish). Arzalia Ediciones. ISBN 978-84-17241-24-7.
