= List of governors of Melilla =

Current flag of Melilla

Current coat of arms of Melilla

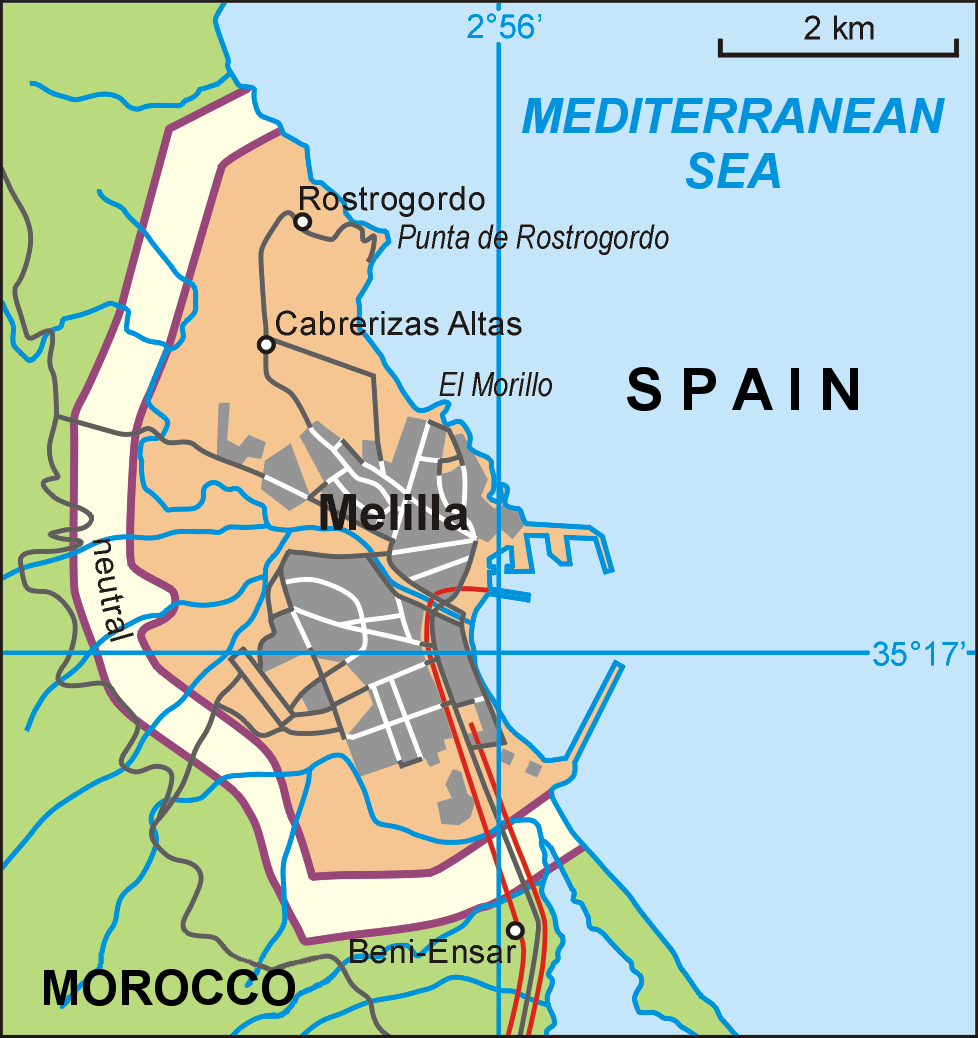
Map of Melilla

The following is a list of governors and other local administrators of the city of Melilla, a Spanish exclave in North Africa. The list encompass the period from 1497 until 1995.

== List ==
=== Governors ===
- 1497–1498: Goméz Suárez
- 1498–1500: Pedro de Estopiñán y Virués
- 1500–1510: Gonzalo Mariño de Rivera (Ribelles)
- 1510–1513: Bernavé Pinelo
- 1513–1518: Fernando de Abreu
- 1518–1522: Gonzalo Mariño de Rivera (Ribelles)
- 1522–1535: Francisco de Medina Monsivay
- 1535–1542: Cristóbal Dabrés (d'Abreu)
- 1543–1546: Hernando de Jérez
- 1546–1554: Juan de Perea
- 1554–1559: Alonso de Urrea
- 1559–1568: Pedro Venegas de Córdoba
- 1568–1571: Francisco Sánchez de Córdoba
- 1571–1595: Antonio de Tejada
- 1595–1596: Jerónimo de los Barrios
- 1596–1603: Martín Dávalos y Padilla
- 1603–1611: Pedro de Herrida
- 1612–1617: Domingo de Dieguez
- 1617–1618: Gaspar de Mondragón
- 1618–1619: Domingo de Ochoa
- 1619–1620: Diego de Leyva
- 1620–1622: Francisco Rodríguez de Sanabria
- 1622–1624: Francisco Ruíz
- 1625–1632: Luis de Sotomayor
- 1632–1633: Pedro Moreo
- 1633–1635: Tomás Mejía de Escobedo
- 1635–1637: Pedro Moreo
- 1637–1648: Gabriel de Peñalosa y Estrada
- 1649 : Luis de Sotomayor
- 1649 : Andrés del Carte y Murisábal (interim)
- 1649–1650: Jordán Jerez
- 1651 : Juan Peñalosa (interim)
- 1651–1655: Pedro Palacio y Guevara
- 1655–1656: Diego de Arce
- 1656–1667: Luis de Velázquez y Angulo
- 1667–1669: Juan de Peñalosa y Estrada
- 1669–1672: Francisco Osorio de Astorga
- 1672–1674: Diego de Arce
- 1674–1675: Pedro Moreo
- 1675–1680: José Frias
- 1680–1683: Diego Toscano y Brito
- 1684–1686: Diego Pacheco y Arce
- 1687 : Francisco López Moreno
- 1687–1688: Antonio Domínguez de Durán
- 1688–1691: Bernabé Ramos y Miranda
- 1692–1697: Antonio de Zúñiga y de la Cerda
- 1697–1703: Domingo de Canal y Soldevila
- 1704–1707: Blas de Trincheria
- 1707–1711: Diego de Flores
- 1711–1714: Juan Jerónimo Ungo de Velasco
- 1714–1715: Patricio Gómez de la Hoz
- 1715–1716: Pedro Sansón (acting)
- 1716–1719: Pedro Borrás
- 1719 : Francisco Ibáñez y Rubalcava
- 1719–1730: Alonso de Guevara y Vasconcelos
- 1730–1732: Juan Andrés del Thoso
- 1731–1732: Francisco de Alba (interim)
- 1732–1757: Antonio Villalba y Angulo
- 1757–1758: Francisco de Alba (interim)
- 1758–1767: Narciso Vázquez Nicuesa
- 1767–1772: Miguel Fernández de Saavedra
- 1772–1777: José Carrión y Andrade
- 1777 : Nicolás Quijano
- 1777–1780: Bernardo Tortosa
- 1780–1782: Antonio Manso
- 1782–1786: José Granados
- 1786–1788: José Naranjo
- 1788–1798: José Rivera
- 1798–1800: Fernando Moyano
- 1800–1814: Ramón Conti
- 1814 : Manuel Ibarra (interim)
- 1814–1821: Jacinto Díaz Capilla
- 1821–1823: Antonio Mateos Malpartida (interim)
- 1823–1824: Juan Pérez de Hacho y Oliván (interim)
- 1824–1826: Luis Cappa Rioseco
- 1826–1829: Manuel García
- 1829–1830: Juan Serrano y Reyna (interim)
- 1830–1835: Luis Cappa Rioseco (2nd time)
- 1835–1836: Lázaro Garcia del Real (interim)
- 1836–1838: Rafael Delgado y Moreno
- 1838–1839: Gregorio Álvarez y Pérez (president of the royal governing junta, Carlist rebellion)
- 1839 : Ramón Robere (interim)
- 1839–1847: Demetrio María de Benito y Hernández
- 1847 : Justo Martín de Villota (interim)
- 1847 : Antonio Lopez de Mendoza (interim)
- 1847–1848: Manuel Arcaya
- 1848–1850: Ignácio Chacón
- 1850–1854: José Eustaquio de Castro y Mendez
- 1854–1856: Manuel Buceta del Villar
- 1856 : José Muñoz (interim)
- 1856–1858: José Morcillo y Ezquerra
- 1858 : Francisco Ceballos (interim)
- 1858–1860: Manuel Buceta del Villar
- 1860–1861: Luis Lemni Demandre de la Breche
- 1861–1862: Felipe Ginovés Espinar
- 1862–1863: Manuel Álvarez Maldonado
- 1863–1864: Thomás O'Ryan y Vázquez
- 1864–1866: Bartolomé de Benavides y Campuzano
- 1866–1868: José Salcedo y González
- 1868–1871: Pedro Beaumont y Peralta
- 1871–1873: Bernardo Alemañy y Perote
- 1873–1879: Andrés Cuadra y Bourman
- 1879–1880: Manuel Macías y Casado
- 1880 : Angel Navascués
- 1880–1881: Evaristo García y Reyna
- 1881–1886: Manuel Macías y Casado
- 1886–1887: Teodoro Camino y Alcobendas
- 1887–1888: Mariano de la Iglesia y Guillén
- 1888 : Juan Villalonga y Soler
- 1888–1889: Rafael Assin y Bazán
- 1889–1891: José Mirelis y González
- 1891 : Santos Asbert Laguna (interim)
- 1891–1893: Juan García y Margallo
- 1893 : Manuel Macías y Casado
- 1893–1894: Juan Arolas y Esplugues
- 1894 : Juan Valverde Carrillo (interim)
- 1894–1895: Rafael Cerero
- 1895–1898: José Alcántara Pérez
- 1898 : Francisco Salinero Bellver
- 1898–1899: Fernando Alameda y Liancourt
- 1899 : Francisco Salinero Bellver (interim)
- 1899–1904: Venancio Hernández y Fernández
- 1904 : Vicente Muñíz Cuadrado (interim)
- 1904–1905: Manuel Serrano y Ruíz
- 1905 : Enrique Segura y Campoy
- 1905 : Vicente Muñíz Cuadrado (interim)
- 1905–1910: José Marina Vega
- 1910–1912: José García Aldave

=== Mayors (Presidentes de la Junta de Arbitrios) ===
- 1912 : Máximo Ramos y Orcajo
- 1913 : Luis Aizpuru y Mondéjar
- 1913 : José Villalba Riquelme
- 1913 : Fernando Moltó Ocampo
- 1913 : José Villalba Riquelme
- 1913 : Juan Montero Montero
- 1913–191.: José Villalba Riquelme
- 191.–1916: Domingo Arráiz de la Conderena
- 1916 : José Sousa del Real
- 1916 : Federico Monteverde Cedano
- 1916 : Ramón Franch Tresserra
- 1916–1917: Luis Jiménez Pajarero
- 1917–1920: Federico Monteverde Cedano
- 1920–1921: Felipe Navarro Ceballos-Escalera, barón de Casa Davalillos
- 1921–1922: Miguel Fresneda Mengíbar
- 1922 : Julio de Ardanaz y Crespo
- 1922 : Jerónimo Palou
- 1922–1925: José García Aldave
- 1925 : Soriano (acting)
- 1925–1927: José García Aldave
- 1927 : Miguel González Carrasco

=== Chairmen of the Municipal Junta ===
- 1927–1928: Francisco Calvo Lucía
- 1928–1931: Cándido Lobera Girela

=== Mayors (Alcaldes) ===
- 1931 : Juan Mendizábal Echevarría
- 1931 : Antonio Díez Martín
- 1931–1933: Miguel Bernardi Tevar
- 1933–1936: Antonio García Vallejo
- 1936 : Antonio Díez Martín
- 1936–1937: José Marfil García
- 1937–1939: Octavio Martínez Cayuela
- 1939–1940: José Marfil García
- 1940 : José Lamas Calvelo
- 1940–1950: Rafael Álvarez Claro
- 1950–1953: Eduardo García Sánchez
- 1953–1956: Gabriel de Beníto Angulo
- 1956–1957: Manuel Requena Cañones
- 1957–1958: Miguel Gómez Morales (acting)
- 1958–1959: Juan Villalón Dombriz
- 1960–1962: Luís Carvajal Arrieta
- 1963 : José Cabanillas Rojas
- 1963–1964: Antonio Romaguera Barceló (interim)
- 1964–1971: Francisco Mir Berlanga
- 1971–1972: Roberto Moreno Valdés (interim)
- 1972–1975: Eduardo León Solá
- 1975–1979: Luis Cobreros Acero
- 1979–1983: Rafael Ginel Cañamaque
- 1981–1991: Gonzalo Hernández Martínez
- 1991–1995: Ignacio Velázquez Rivera

For continuation after 1995, see: Mayor-President of Melilla

== Sources ==
- World Statesmen.org
