= Siege of Larache (1689) =

Moroccan victory over Spain

Coordinates: 35.1833°N 6.1500°W

- Part of the Spanish-Moroccan conflicts
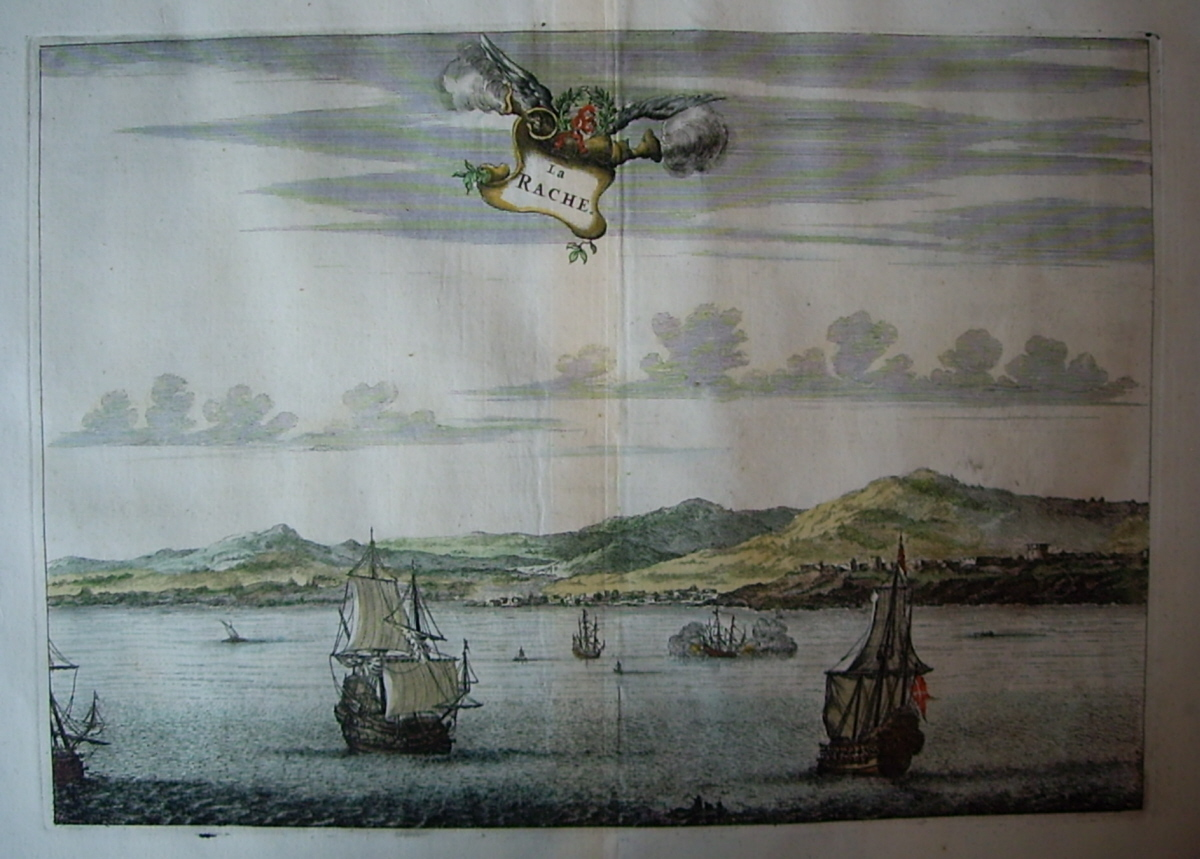
- A view of the port of Larache in 1670.
Date	August 1689 – 11 November 1689
Location	Larache, Morocco
Result	Moroccan victory

Belligerents
Sultanate of Morocco	Kingdom of Spain

Commanders and leaders
(Morocco) Ismail Ibn Sharif (Morocco) Ali ben Abdallah	(Spain) Fernando Villorias (surrendered)

Strength
30,000 cavalry	2,000 soldiers 200 artillery

Casualties and losses
30 killed	400 killed 1,600 captured 40 artillery captured 160 artillery lost

The siege of Larache, in 1689, was undertaken by an army of Morocco under 'Alawid Sultan Ismail Ibn Sharif against the Spanish forces of Charles II, which had ruled the city for almost 80 years since its cession in 1610. After three months of siege, the defenders were forced to capitulate.

== Background ==
With the arrival of Ismail Ibn Sharif to the throne, Morocco lived its hours of glory since it succeeded in centralising power and putting down the rebellions of rebel tribes. The Sultan also succeeded in fighting the Ottomans of the Regency of Algiers. While several coastal towns in Morocco were under the control of Europeans from Spain and Portugal, Mawlay Ismail, who had just taken over al-Mahdya in 1681, which had been under the control of the Spanish since 1614, and succeeded in retaking Tangier in 1684 from the English, decided to retake the city of Larache by force. This city had been under the control of the Spaniards since 1610, who established a very fortified garrison.

== Siege ==
In 1689, Mawlay Ismail raised a strong army of 30,000 horsemen to recapture Larache, while the Spaniards had a garrison made up of 2,000 soldiers and 200 guns present in the fortress to protect the city. The Spaniards were prepared for this attack and had greatly fortified the city because in 1688, the Moroccan Sultan had directly declared his intentions to them. But according to Figueras, the Spaniards knew the intentions of the Moroccans from 1687. From 1688, the Spaniards began to supply and strengthen the city. Before the eve of the fighting, a thousand men were in the city.

Military operations began on 14 July 1689, and a month later, in August 1689, the Moroccan army completely surrounded the city, it was commanded by the Caid Ali ben Abdallah.

The French consul in Salé, Périllié, kept the Marquis informed of the evolution of this siege. For example, on 10 October 1689, he affirmed that the Moroccans had "two mines ready to play" and that two thousand Spaniards were on the spot, including two hundred volunteers. On 6 November, he then claimed that the Moroccans launched a final assault and that they succeeded getting past the walls of the city, which had been protected by several hundred cannons, thanks to the explosion of two mines which opened breaches in the city walls. The assault took place eight days earlier in which the Spanish forces entrenched themselves in the city's citadel.

Périllié also added that once Larache was taken over, Mawlay Ismail planned to then take over Ceuta, Melilla and Mazagan. Finally on 11 November, the Spanish troops surrendered. Périllié wrote to the Marquis on 18 November that the city of Larache fell following the surrender of the Spanish soldiers, but according to other sources, the assault took place on 1 November 1689 and was taken by the Moroccan forces on the same day.

The Spaniards had 400 soldiers killed and 1,600 men taken prisoner, in addition to the capture of around 40 artillery. According to Jean-Baptiste Estelle, these artillery were sent to Meknes. Another source claims that 1,700 men were taken prisoner.

== Negotiation ==
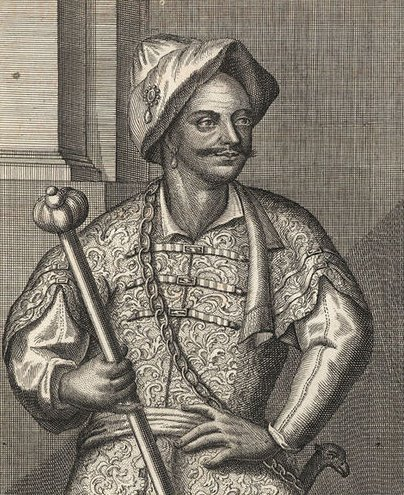
The 'Alawid sultan of Morocco, Ismail Ibn Sharif

The capitulation was negotiated in Meknes with Mawlay Ismail by Gaspar Gonzáles, who was an envoy of the governor of Larache, Fernāndo Villorias y Medrano himself, who had been captured during the siege. According to the agreement, the governor and 100 officers would be able to freely return to Spain, while the rest of the garrison with a total of 1,700 men would be taken to Meknes. However the sultan did not respect this agreement in any way, and so the governor and the hundred officers would also be taken to Meknes. Several exchange requests have been made on both sides.

Initially, a Spaniard named Manuel de Vaira Lobo was sent to negotiate the release of the officers as well, as the governor. But the Moroccan sultan Mawlay Ismail thus asked for the release of a thousand Moroccans, in a ratio of 1 Spanish officer for 10 Moroccans. In a first treaty, it was agreed that 500 Moroccans as well as 5,000 Arabic books of the Escorial library be exchanged for the officers. Mawlay Ismail went so far as to send a man named Mohammed al-Wazir al-Hassani to examine the books; he stayed in Spain from November 1690 to July 1691, but when he arrived, the religious authorities lied to the Moroccan sent by Mawlay Ismail, telling him that everything had burned down after the fire in the Escorial library in 1671.

Thus Spain was forced to accept the first request of Mawlay Ismail which asked for the release of 1,000 Moroccans against 100 Spanish officers. After the confirmation of this exchange, the consul of France in Salé Jean-Baptiste Estelle affirmed that it was "A beautiful agreement concluded" in February 1691. As the Spanish officers were on their way to Ceuta, a thousand Moroccans were waiting for them there for the exchange, the sultan even claimed that the King of Spain only exchanged aged and ill Moroccans, but kept the healthy ones. The former soldiers of the Spanish garrisons based in the coastal towns of Morocco, captured by the Moroccans, were converted to Islam by the hundreds. The exchange finally took place in Ceuta in September 1691, but according to the French consul of Tangier, Pierre Estelle, the operation was very expensive, apart from the Moroccans exchanged for Spain.

== Aftermath ==
After taking over the city of Larache, Mawlay Ismail tried by all means to retake the town of Mazagan from the Portuguese. But he did not have time to do this as he died in Meknes in 1727 at the age of 82. But it fell under the control of Morocco in 1769 under Mohammed III. Larache was then attacked again, unsuccessfully, but this time by the French navy, which bombarded the city on 25 June 1765 with 16 warships and several vessels. It remained under Moroccan control until 1911 when the Spaniards occupied the city and established a protectorate in northern Morocco.

== See also ==
- Cession of Larache
- Larache expedition
- Siege of Melilla (1774–1775)

== Bibliography ==
- de Castries, Colonel H (1927). Les Sources inédites de l'Histoire du Maroc (in French). Archives de la Bibliothèque de France.
- Ogot, Bethwell Alan (1992). General history of Africa V: Africa from the sixteenth to the eighteenth century. UNESCO. ISBN 9789231017117.
- Alaoui, Ismaïl; Mrini, Driss (1997). Salé : Cité millénaire, Rabat, Éclat (in French). Rabat. ISBN 9981999504.
- Maziane, Leïla (2007). Salé et ses corsaires, 1666–1727 : un port de course marocain au xviie siècle (in French). Presses universitaires de Caen. ISBN 9782841332823.
- Figueras, Tomás García (1973). Larache: datos para su historia en el siglo XVII (in Spanish). Paris.
