= Conquest of Melilla =

1497 conquest

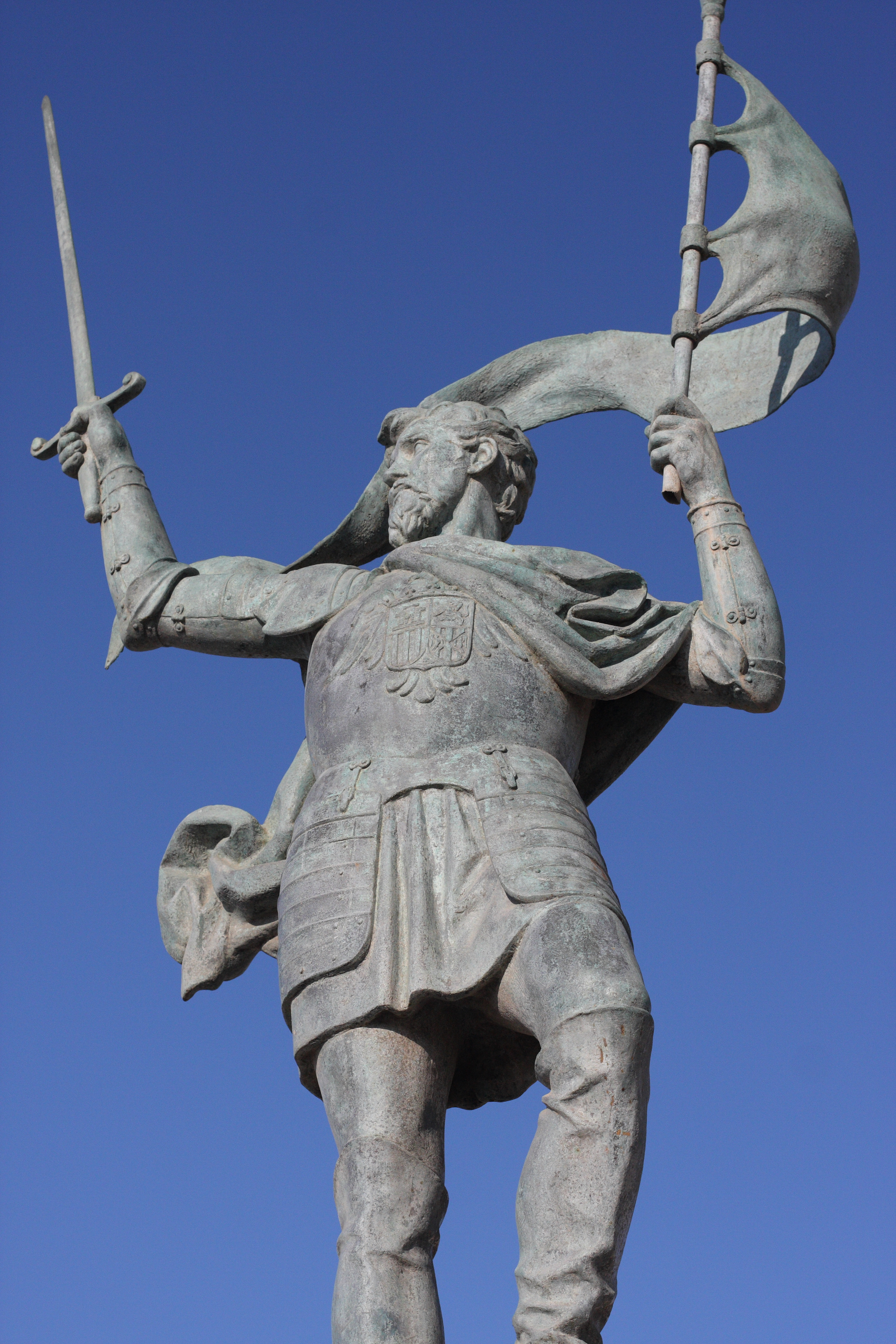
Statue of Pedro de Estopiñán y Virués in Melilla

The Conquest of Melilla occurred on the 17th of September 1497, when a fleet sent by the Duke of Medina Sidonia occupied the north African city of Melilla.

After the conquest of Granada by Spain and the fall of the Emirate of Granada the Mediterranean coast of the Sultanate of Fez became very unsettled, often raided by Barbary pirates or pirates from Cádiz.

Melilla and other cities fell in decadence, unlike cities on the Atlantic coast with most of the economic activity. Also, the port, fortress and walls of Melilla had been destroyed in disputes between the rulers of Fez and Tlemcen. The Catholic monarchs saw Melilla as a way to expand along the African Mediterranean coast to secure Aragonese, Castilian and Genoese sea trade. However, by the end of the Granada War, Melilla was in the Portuguese zone of influence under the terms of the 1479 Treaty of Alcáçovas.

After the 1494 Treaty of Tordesillas the crown of Castile attempted to conquer of Melilla but still needed to end the Conquest of the Canary Islands, not to mention the economic efforts set on the voyages of Christopher Columbus.

The prominent Duke of Medina Sidonia, one of the wealthiest men in the Crown of Castile, contributed soldiers to the Battle of Aguere during the Conquest of the Canary Islands, and sent Pedro Estopiñán to Melilla with ships, soldiers and builders. They arrived on 17 September 1497, conquered the city virtually without a fight, and started to rebuild the city walls and fortress. The Wattasid ruler Muhammad al-Shaykh sent a detachment of cavalry to retake the city, but they were repulsed by the guns of the Spanish ships.

After the conquest of Melilla, Cazaza and Mazalquivir fell in 1505, Peñón de Vélez de la Gomera in 1508, Oran in 1509, and the Peñón of Algiers, Béjaïa and Tripoli in 1510. Annaba, Bizerta, Tunis and La Goulette fell in 1535, while the Portuguese focused on the Atlantic coast, conquering Ceuta (1415), Tangier (1471), Mazagan (1502), Agadir (1505), Mogador (1506), and Casablanca (1515).

September 17 is Melilla Day.

== See also ==
- Plazas de soberanía
- Conquest of the Canary Islands

== Bibliography ==
- Bravo Nieto, Antonio (1990). "La ocupación de Melilla en 1497 y las relaciones entre los Reyes Católicos y el duque de Medina Sidonia". Aldaba. Melilla: Universidad Nacional de Educación a Distancia: 15–38. ISSN 0213-7925.
- Castrillo Márquez, Rafaela (2000). "Melilla bajo los Medina Sidonia, a través de la documentación existente en la Biblioteca Real de Madrid". Anaquel de Estudios Árabes. 11. Madrid: Universidad Complutense de Madrid. ISSN 1130-3964.
