= Battle of the Alcaides =

- Part of the Moroccan–Portuguese conflicts
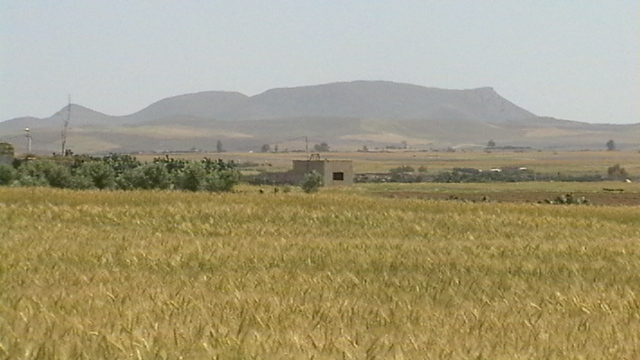
- Jbel Lakhdar, by the foot of which the Battle of Alcaides took place
Date	April 14 1514
Location	Boulaouane, Morocco
Result	Portuguese victory

Belligerents
Kingdom of Portugal	Sultanate of Morocco

Commanders and leaders
João de Meneses	Ahmed al-Attar; Lutete

Strength
1000 Portuguese horsemen 1,300 Portuguese infantry 2000 Muslim horsemen	7,000 men

Casualties and losses
50-150 dead 100 wounded	2,000 dead 280 prisoners

The Battle of the Alcaides, fought in April 14 1514, was a significant military engagement between the forces of the sultan of Fez and the Portuguese defenders, along with their local allies, near the town of Boulaouane. It was the only major pitched-battle fought by the Portuguese in Morocco before the catastrophic defeat at Alcácer-Quibir 64 years later.

== Background ==
Portugal had been militarily involved in Morocco ever since the Portuguese conquest of Ceuta in 1415. Morocco fell to civil-war a few years afterwards, which allowed the Portuguese Crown to expand its influence in the region.

A struggle between the Marinid sultan Abd Al-Haqq II and his Wattasid regents allowed Afonso V of Portugal to capture Ksar es-Seghir in 1458. Central authority was then weak in southern Morocco, which was frequented by numerous Portuguese merchants, fishermen and shipowners, who engaged with local authorities. Certain coastal communities developed important commercial and political ties with Portugal and rejected their ties with Fez. During the reign of king Afonso V of Portugal, the coastal cities of Safi and Azzemour offered tribute in exchange for protection against local tribes. Anfa was a notoious pirate haven and it was destroyed by the Portuguese in 1468. Asilah was captured by the Portuguese in 1471, as well as Tangier. After these events, Muhammad al-Shaykh signed a treaty acknowledging Portuguese ownership of Tangier and Asilah in exchange for a truce, in order to focus on fighting the Marinids, and the following year he captured Fez, thus becoming the first Wattasid sultan of Morocco.

Instability and opposition to Wattasid rule in Morocco continued in the following decades. As the result of the growing Portuguese trade with Guinea, King John II shifted Portuguese attention away from northern Morocco to the south, where the Portuguese easily obtained Moroccan wheat, horses and textiles at Safi, Azzemour and other ports, to trade for Guinean gold.

By the late 1480s, most of the towns and tribes along the Atlantic coast of Morocco had come to terms with the Portuguese and traded with them. The king dispatched an expedition to Chaouia in 1487, following an appeal by a close relative of the sultan, who requested Portuguese aid against the rebels of the region. An attempt to build a fort inland was then repulsed at the siege of Graciosa however. The following year, the Portuguese sacked Targa, another known pirate haven.

=== The offensive of King Manuel in Morocco ===
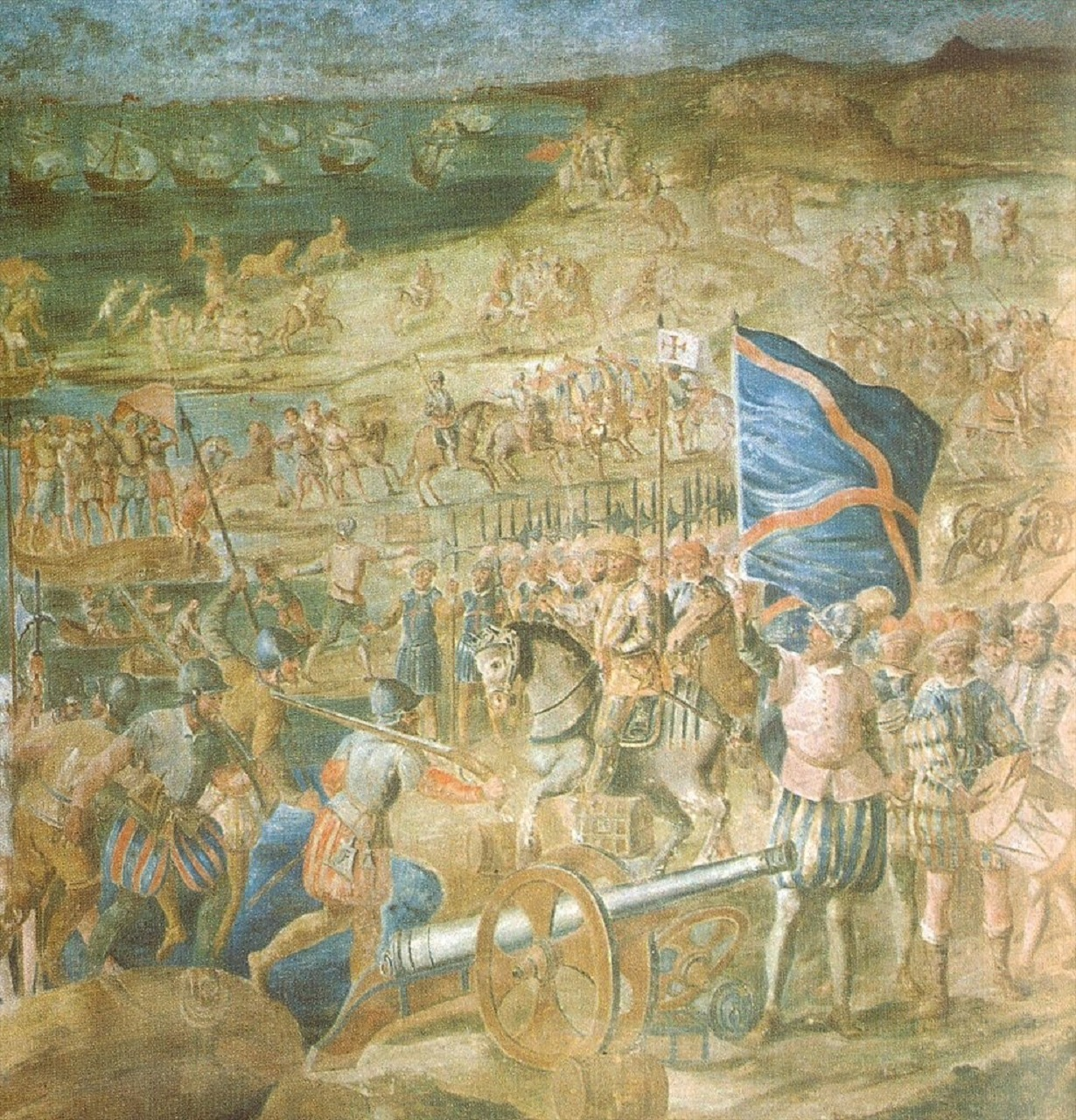
The landing of Portuguese troops in Morocco, shortly before the capture of Azzemour in 1513.

As hostilities between Christian and Muslim powers continued, Iberian kings endeavoured to proceed with the Reconquista into north-Africa but Morocco was disputed between Portugal and Castile. Castilian attacks in Morocco had been increasing and they presented Portugal with serious competition. Castilian recognition of Portuguese claims to the kingdom of Fez was among the terms obtained by King John II with the signing of the Treaty of Alcáçovas in 1479.

John II was succeeded in 1495 by Manuel I, who envisoned the capture of Fez and Marrakesh. This he sought to do by first strengthening Portuguese garrisons in Morocco and capturing key points along the coast as far south as the Sous region, before moving on those two cities. He pledged a tenth of all war-spoils to the Church and prepared the chartering of ships in anticipation for a major landing in Morocco. New commanderies were created within the prestigious Order of Christ to reward officers who distinguished themselves in Morocco. Nevertheless, the Catholic Monarchs, Queen Isabella of Castile and King Ferdinand of Aragon kept trying to subvert Manuels plans and he was only able to launch his offensive in 1505. The stronghold of Santa Cruz do Cabo de Gué was established that year where Agadir now stands, to control a strategic route into the Sous valley. Another fort was established at Mogador, and another at Souira Guedima, or Aguz, by the mouth of the Tensift river. The major coastal city of Safi was captured in 1508. Azzemour was captured in 1513 and another fortress built at the nearby harbour of Mazagão. Mazagão was considered the best anchorage in Morocco. Before long, the captain of Safi Nuno Fernandes de Ataíde had brought all the neighbouring tribes in the region under submission and established the Protectorate of Doukkala. With the support of the notable Yahya u-Tafuft as commander of auxiliaries, Ataíde personally led a number of expeditions as far inland as Marrakesh and the Atlas Mountains, subduing tribes or attacking hostile ones.

=== The counter-attack of the Sultan of Fez ===
Political situiation in Morocco in the early 16th century.

The sultan of Fez Abu Abd Allah al-Burtuqali Muhammad ibn Muhammad realized the danger his throne was in, should the Portuguese consolidate their positions in the south, and sought to recover lost territory. Rumours that al-Burtuqali wished to siege Azzemour reached the Portuguese by December 1513.

As increasingly clear reports of the preparations of the sultan reached Azzemour, the Portuguese realized the vulnerability of their position, as the construction of the new walls were still underway. An effective system of intelligence, informants and spies set up by the Portuguese provided them with reliable information regarding the forces of the sultan by March 1514. He had dispatched to Doukkala a vanguard of 7000 men led by two qaids (alcaides in Portuguese), Ahmad al-Attar and Lutete. They camped at Souk al-Khamis, 15kms from Boulaoune while they waited for the arrival of the sultan with the bulk of his forces, yet the sultan was unexpectedly forced to march north to protect the towns of Ksar el-Kebir and Larache, whose governors had attempted to attack Portuguese Tangier but been routed. The two qaids meanwhile were poorly received by the inhabitants of the region and blocked from lodging safely at the Boulaouane kasbah. They therefore set out to link up with the forces of the brother of the sultan and viceroy of Meknez Moulay Nasir, who was camped with his forces near the ruins of Anfa.

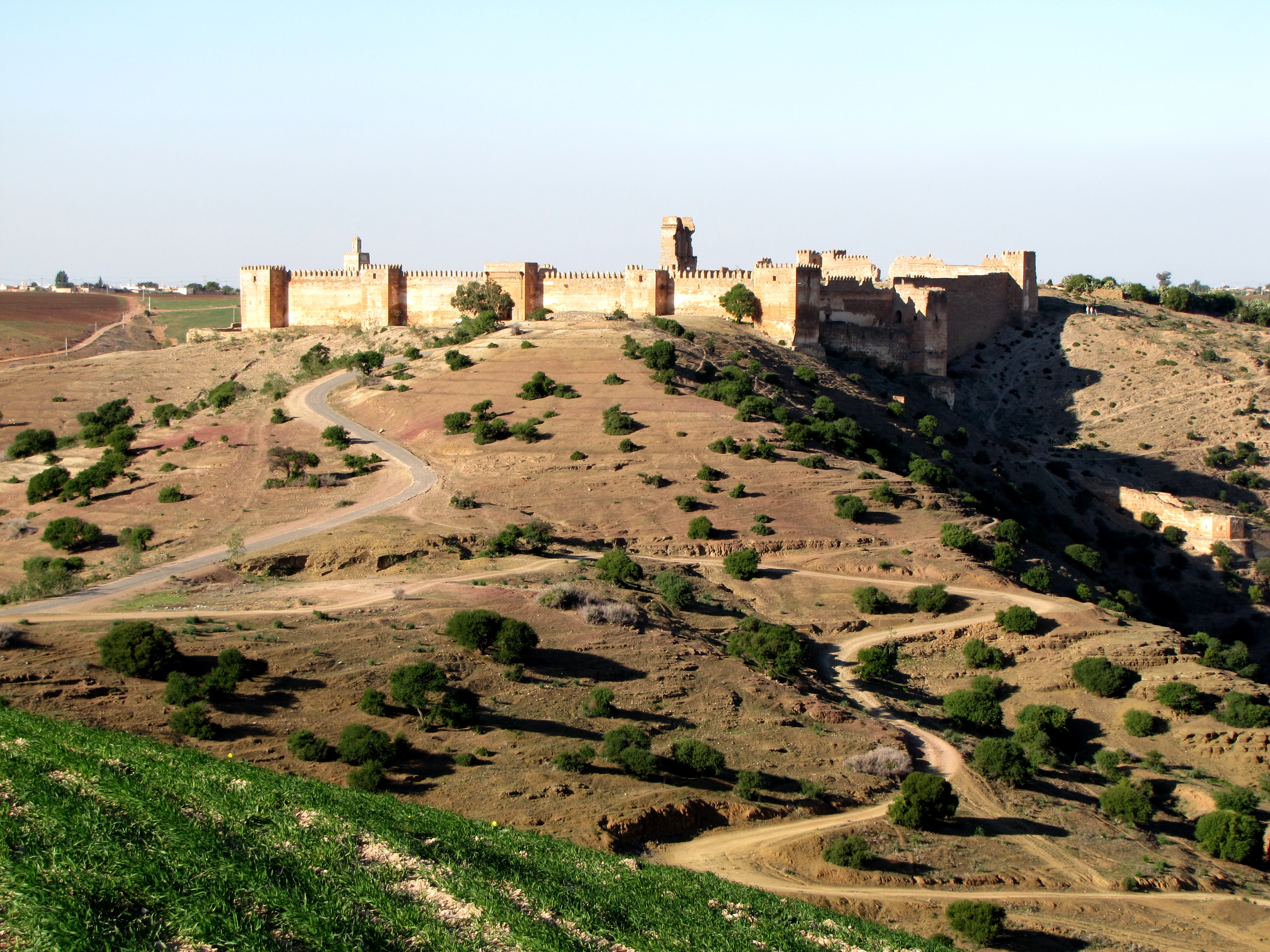
The Boulaouane kasbah.

The captains of Safi and Azzemour thus decided to gather their forces and jointly repulse the forces of the two qaids in a preemptive, surprise attack. The Portuguese moved out with 1000 lancers, 200 of which under the personal command of Nuno Fernandes de Ataíde, 1300 footmen, among crossbowmen, arquebusiers and pikemen, plus 2000 auxiliary Muslim horsemen under Yahya u-Tafuft. They were under the overall command of captain-major-of-the-field Dom João de Meneses.

== The battle ==
The Portuguese found the qaids camped with their forces on the open fields by the foot of the Jbel Lakhdar, or Green Mountain. Battle was struck early in the morning of April 14. Meneses divided his forces in five squadrons. He commanded one squadron, Yahya u-Tafuft another with Muslim auxiliaries and Ataíde another with a mix of veteran Portuguese horsemen and Muslim auxiliaries. Two squadrons of infantry protected the baggage carts and the cannon in the rear.

Portuguese battle-standard used on land and at sea, featuring a cross of the Order of Christ.

Yahya u-Tafuft was instructed to advance around the flank and skirmish with the enemy as a diversionary tactic. Ataíde was ordered not to advance until signalled. Fighting began at about 7 a.m. with 800 Muslim footmen, variously described as archers, crossbowmen and arquebusiers, engaging the Portuguese from a great distance without effect. Meneses routed them with a heavy cavalry charge, supported by a large number of auxiliaries, and most were killed in the ensuing pursuit by the veteran forces of Nuno Fernandes de Ataíde. The renowned geographer Leo Africanus was a distant eyewitness of the battle, and wrote that the footmen "were so miserablie slaine, that scarcely twelve archers of all the eight hundreth could escape..." The cavalry of the qaids then began withdrawing to the Jbel Lakhdar or seeking refuge among local villages.

With the Wattasid forces now scattered, many Portuguese soldiers broke ranks to plunder the enemy camp, which gave the qaids time to rally their men. Some Portuguese crossed a dry stream and followed them up the Green Mountain in poor order, until they suffered a counter-attack that forced them back in disarray, and nearly proved fatal. They were saved by the veteran horsemen of Ataíde, supported by a squadron of pikemen, who advanced in orderly fashion to their aid.

== Aftermath ==
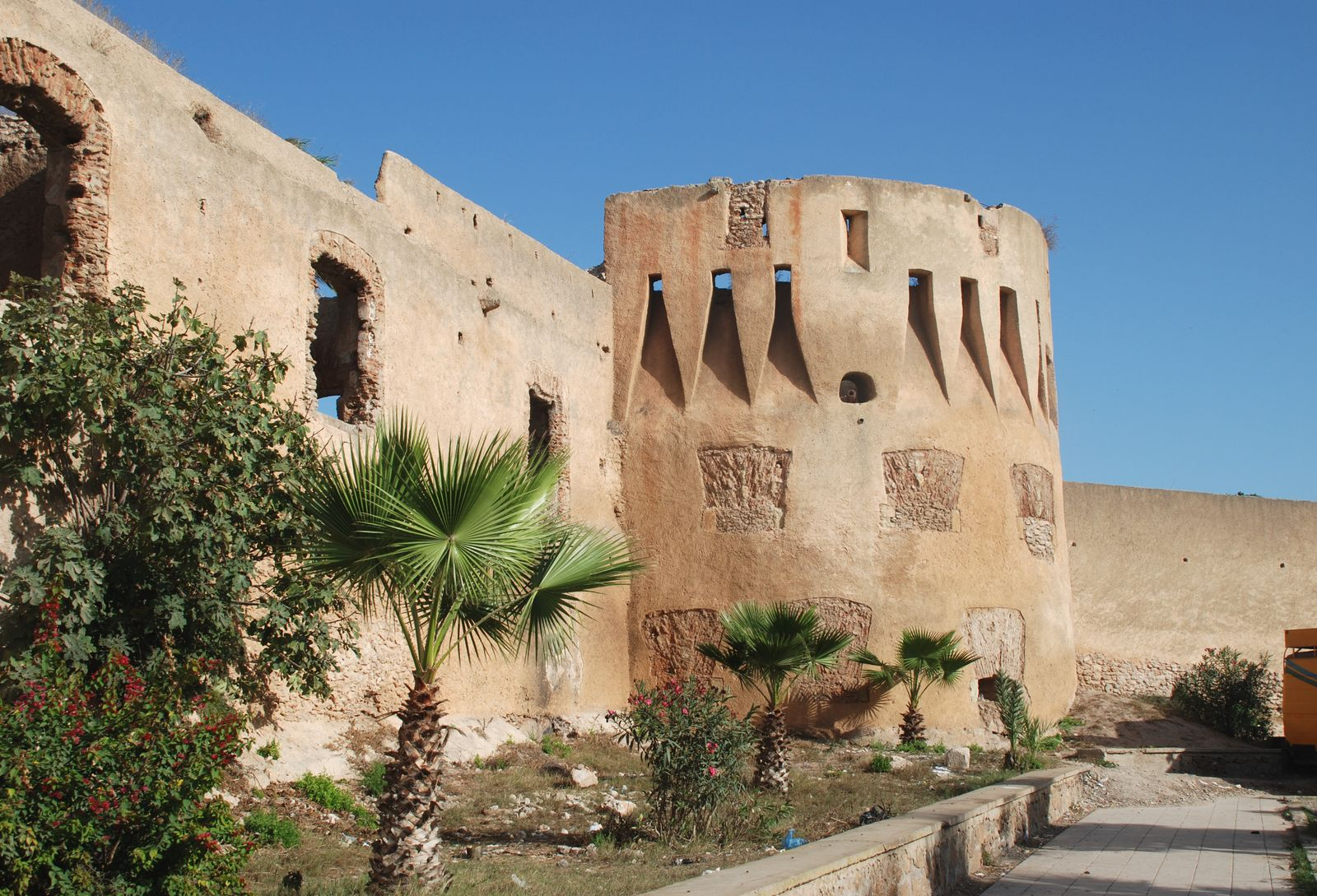
The Portuguese walls of Azzemour.

The Portuguese sufered 50 to 150 dead and 100 wounded. The qaids suffered 2000 dead and 280 men taken prisoner. The latter would later be ransomed.

Moulay Nasir arrived with his forces only the following day. He began collecting taxes from the local population and tried to reassert the authority of the sultan of Fez but he suffered an ambush by the forces of Yahya u-Tafuft and was routed. Rebuffed by the tribes of Doukkala, the Hintata emir of Marrakesh also refused to grant him refuge in the city and he was forced to return to Fez immediately to avoid capture. As Moulay Nasir could not protect them, the inhabitants of Boulaouane evacuated their town and fled to the mountains.

Dom João de Meneses was bed-ridden after the battle due to his old age and the grief of losing several close family members in the fighting. He died a few days later, which ensombered the atmosphere among the Portuguese.

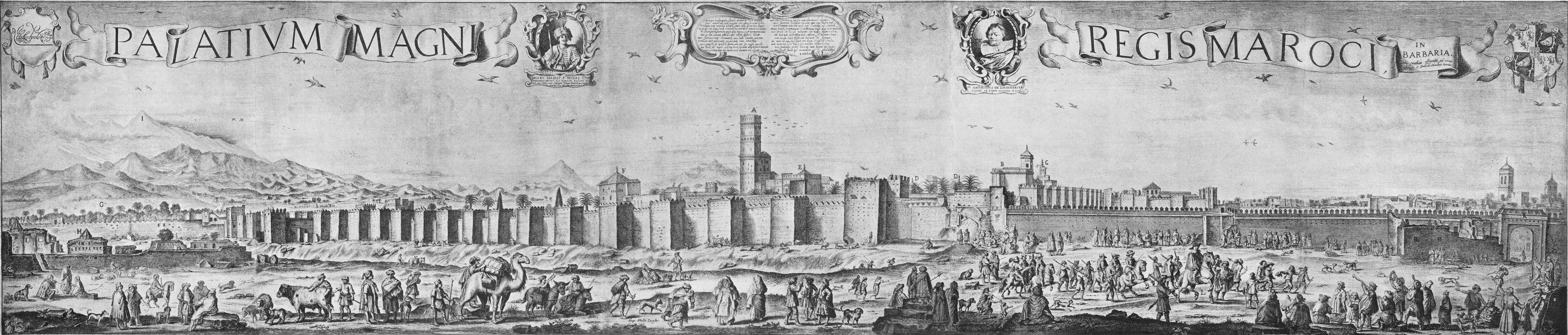
The city of Marrakesh.

The Battle of Alcaides allowed the Portuguese to tighten their grip on the region and encroach on Marrakesh. The annexation of southern Morocco appeared imminent, as in the summer of 1514 the emir of Marrakesh opened talks to submit to King Manuel, but negotiations failed. The city was approached by Portuguese horsemen in October of that year and in April 1515 Ataíde led a daring attack on the city, though he was repulsed.

== See also ==
- Portuguese conquest of Tangier
- Battle of Azemmour
- Battle of Mamora (1515)
- Battle of Tednest
- Portuguese Asilah
- Portuguese Tangier
- Siege of Agadir (1533)
- Fall of Agadir
