= Raid of Marrakesh (1515) =

1515 Portuguese military action

- Part of Moroccan–Portuguese conflicts
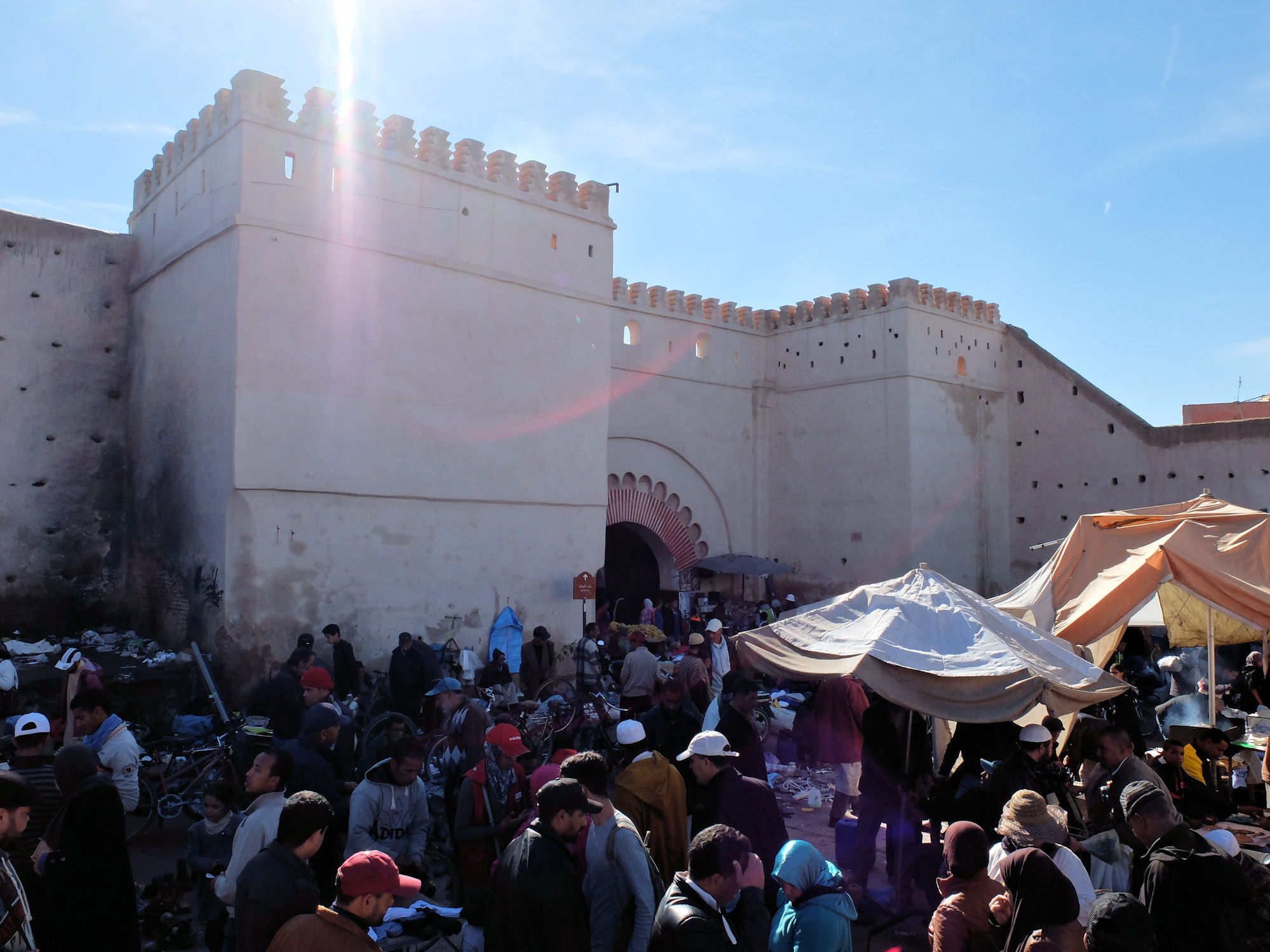
- Bab el Khemis Gate in Marrakesh where the Moroccan garrison engaged with the Portuguese troops
Date	23 April 1515
Location	Marrakesh
Result	Moroccan victory

Belligerents
(Portugal) Portuguese Empire	Hintata; Saadians

Commanders and leaders
Nuno Fernandes de Ataíde; Dom Pedro de Sousa; Sheikh of Abido; Sheikh of Garabia; Sheikh Cid Meimam	Emir Nasr al-Hintati

Strength
550 Portuguese horsemen 2,500 Muslim horsemen	Unknown

Casualties and losses
None Portuguese killed but some wounded 10 or 12 Berbers killed and many wounded.	Unknown

The Raid of Marrakesh took place on April 23, 1515, when the Portuguese governor of Safi Nuno Fernandes de Ataíde led a raid that penetrated as far as Marrakesh in hopes of forcing its Hintata ruler to accept Portuguese suzerainty. The attack, however, failed. It is considered the most daring exploit in the career of Ataíde and the high point of Portuguese expansion in Morocco.

== Background ==
The Portuguese seized Azemmour (Azamor in Portuguese) in 1513 and erected a new fortress nearby at Mazagan (Magazão, now al-Jadida) in 1514. From Safi and Azemmour, the Portuguese cultivated the alliance of local Arab and Berber client tribes in the surrounding region, with the notable aid of a certain powerful Yahya u-Tafuft. The Portuguese and their allies dispatched armed columns inland, subjugating the region of Doukkala and soon encroached on Marrakesh.

Although nominally subject to the Wattasid sultan at Fez, the Berber Hintata emirs of Marrakech were effectively independent. Yet their rule was weak and barely reached the coast. The region of Marrakech was filled with rebel and unsubdued tribes, while the city was partly ruined by that time owing to nomad incursions. The captains of Safi and Azzemour encouraged king Manuel to cross over to Morocco with a large army and seize the city.

In February 1514, the captain of Portuguese Azemmour Dom João de Meneses departed with a force to attack the city, but he was forced to turn back to defend Portuguese territory in Doukkala from Wattasid attack. At the Battle of the Alcaides, an approaching Wattasid force was repulsed in a pitched battle by the Portuguese.

Emir Nasir ibn Chentaf, the Hintata ruler of the city, was forced to agree to tribute and allow the Portuguese to erect a fortress in Marrakesh. The summer of 1514 was spent in negotiations. However, an agreement was not reached, so in October of that same year the Portuguese and their Moorish allies returned at the head of a strong army.

The Portuguese and their clients under the command of the almocadém (military scout or guide) of Safi David Lopes reached the outskirts of Marrakesh. Some Berber auxiliaries managed to reach the walls of the city, thrust their spears into the gates and shout:

"Long live Dom Manuel our lord!"

At Safi, captain Nuno Fernandes de Ataíde was jealous of these acts, but could hardly speak against them. Worried about the possibility that someone else might seize Marrakech before him, he decided to enact a strong attack against the city the following year.

On January 22, 1515, Ataíde led a raiding party of 300 Portuguese and 300 Muslims on an attack against a number of villages in the vicinity of Marrakesh, but no force was dispatched against them. Instead the city gates were shut and its garrison remained behind the walls. Some Portuguese rode up to one of its gates and used chalk to write their names and those of "their ladies" on it.

== Battle of Marrakesh, 23 April 1515 ==
In conjunction with the new captain of Azemmour Dom Pedro de Sousa, in April of 1515 Ataíde gathered a larger force of 550 Portuguese and 2,500 allied Muslims for another campaign against Marrakesh. Ataíde raised an army of about 3000 men mostly made up of Berber auxiliaries. It included 200 lancers under the command of Portuguese governor of Azamor Dom Pedro de Sousa, 300 lancers under Ataíde, 600 lancers commanded by the sheikh of Abida, 800 by the sheikh Cid Meimam of Xerquia and 1000 by the sheikh of Garabia.

The Portuguese left Azamor and Safim on April 21. They and reached the banks of the Tensift River two days later. On April 23, 1515, they engaged in fighting with the defenders of Marrakesh, near the gates of Bab el-Khemis and Bab ad-Debbagh, located on the northeast side of the Walls, the Hintata ruler of Marrakesh was supported militarily by the Saadians and diplomatically by the Wattasids.

Ataíde commanded the center, the sheikhs of Abida and Xerquia the left Portuguese wing, the sheikh of Garabia on the right. The fighting lasted for four hours. It resulted in dead and wounded on both sides and the Portuguese withdrew to avoid being surrounded. The withdrawal lasted another two days, however, it was not peaceful because their rear was pursued by the Moroccans. Though he was ultimately unsuccessful, Ataíde was the first to engage in a major battle for the most symbolically important city of Morocco.

== See also ==
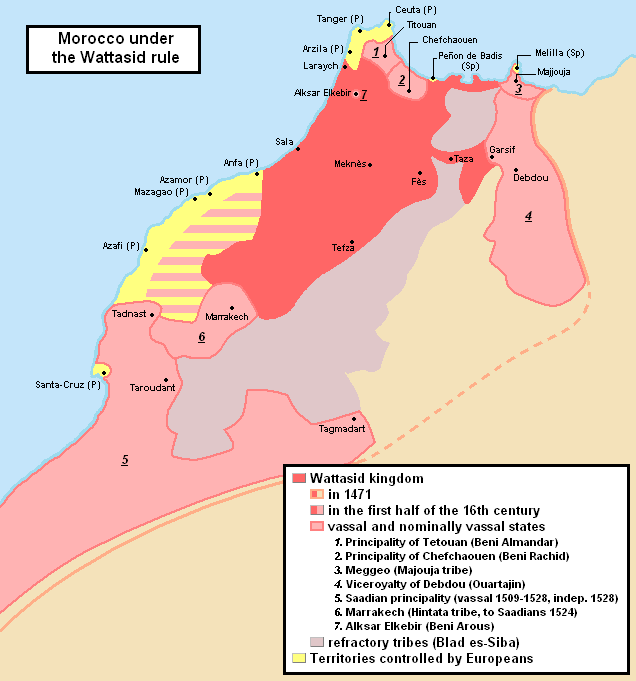
Morocco in the early 16th century.

- Battle of Azemmour
- Battle of Tednest
- Battle of Mamora (1515)
- Portuguese Tangier
- Portuguese Asilah
- Protectorate of Doukkala

== Sources ==
- Cenival, Pierre de (1913–36) "Marrakush" in T. Houtsma, editor, The Encyclopedia of Islam: a dictionary of the geography, ethnogropy and biography of the Mohammaden peoples. Reprinted 1987 as E.J. Brill's Encyclopedia of Islam, Leiden: E.J. Brill., vol.5 p. 296-306
- Cenival Pierre de (2007) "Marrakesh", new edition of 1913-36 article, in C.E. Bosworth, editor, Historic Cities of the Islamic World, Leiden: Brill p. 319-32.
