= Targa expedition (1490) =

Part of Moroccan-Portuguese conflicts

Sack of Targa and Comice
- Part of Moroccan–Portuguese conflicts
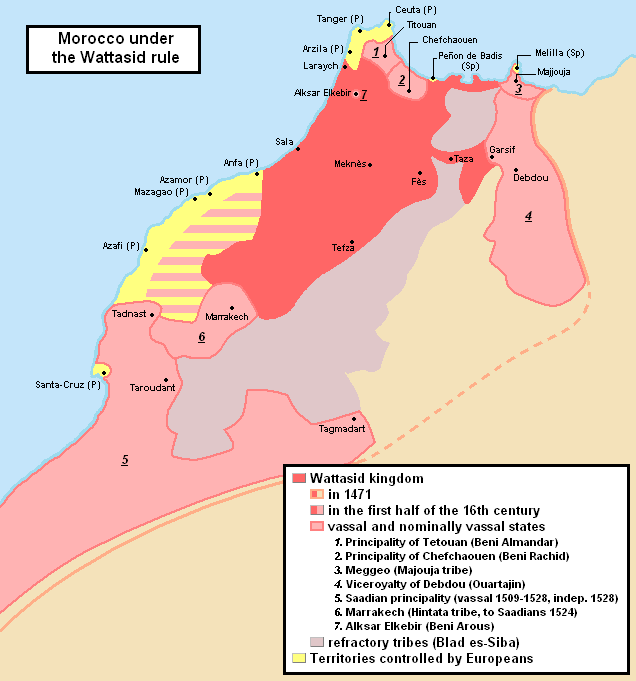
- Morocco in the late 15th early 16th century.
Date	1490
Location	Targa
Result	Portuguese victory

Belligerents
Kingdom of Portugal	Wattasid Morocco

Commanders and leaders
Dom Fernando de Meneses	Unknown.

Strength
130 horse, 1,870 foot. 50 ships.	Unknown

Casualties and losses
40 dead.	Several hundreds captured.

The Portuguese Targa expedition took place in 1490 when a Portuguese fleet commanded by Dom Fernando de Meneses plundered the town of Targa, a known pirate haven in Morocco. On the same occasion, Dom Fernando sacked the Moroccan mountain town of Comice.

== History ==
The Portuguese occupied Ceuta in 1415 at the Conquest of Ceuta. In 1490, King John II prepared an expedition against the Moroccan qaid of Chefchaouen Ali Ibn Rashid al-Alam ("Barraxa" in Portuguese), and entrusted command to the son of the Marquis of Vila Real, Dom Fernando de Meneses, who was provided with 50 ships. Having called at Gibraltar, he messaged the captain of Ceuta Dom António de Meneses (who was his brother) that he would disembark in that city shortly to attack Chefchaouen, but Dom António dissuaded him from undertaking the campaign, which he considered impractical. Dom Fernando was instead persuaded to attack the town of Targa, which was a known pirate haven to the south-east of Ceuta. Having been joined by some Spanish volunteers, the expedition ultimately numbered 130 horse and 1870 foot.

As soon as the fleet came into sight of Targa, the settlement was evacuated by its inhabitants, leaving ample spoil behind. The Portuguese disembarked, captured 25 ships, 370 people, weapons including cannons, released a number of Christian POWs and razed the town along with the surrounding agricultural fields.

Unsatisfied with the attack on Targa, Dom Fernando later that year joined forces with the captains of Portuguese Tangier and Alcácer-Ceguer to sack a town on the Rif mountains the Portuguese identified as Comice. With an army then numbering 400 horses and 1200 feet the Portuguese sacked the town and captured ample spoil, including 100 or 1000 persons, cattle and horses. 40 Portuguese died in the action.

== See also ==
- Portuguese conquest of Ceuta
- Portuguese conquest of Ksar es-Seghir
- Anfa expedition (1468)
- Portuguese conquest of Asilah
- Chaouia expedition
- Portuguese Asilah
- Portuguese Tangier
