= Protectorate of Doukkala =

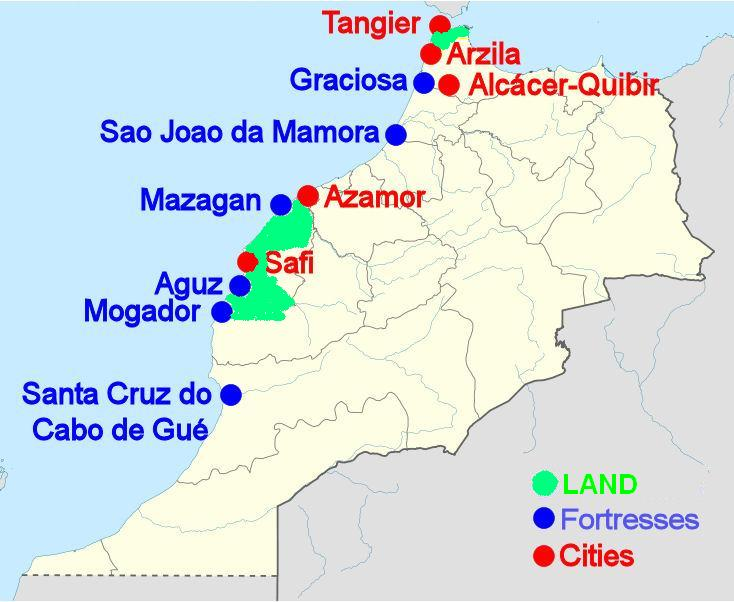
Doukkala under Portuguese influence (in green)

The Protectorate of Doukkala was a vast vassal territory established by the governor Nuno Fernandes de Ataíde, who governed it until his death in 1516.

== History ==
The region of Doukkala had been considered one of the prime breadbaskets of the western Maghreb for centuries up to the 15th and 16th centuries. Leo Africanus reported that northern Doukkala in particular was especially fertile due to high yields of grain and lifestock. By the 1500s Arab pastoralists dominated more than four-fifths of the land in Doukkala and made up three-fourths of the population. Most were members of the Banu Hilal tribe, who had been moved in from Tunisia and Algeria by the Almohads, in order to put pressure on the Sanhaja tribe, who were political rivals of the Almohads. By the time the Portuguese arrived therefore, the native Berbers had been pushed to the fringes of the region, the previously widespread viticulture and communal irrigation systems of the lowlands were gone, arboriculture was restriced to the Berber-dominated highlands and private ownership of land had been replaced by tribal usufruct based on cattle raising, outside of small market-oriented farms located near the few towns in the region. As the Arab tribesmen settled in strictily defined boundaries however, they gradually adopted cereal agriculture.

Portugal became militarily envolved in Morocco ever since the Portuguese conquest of Ceuta in 1415. Morocco fell to civil-war, but all the while Portuguese merchants and agents pursued commercial relations with several costal communities further to the south, such as the important trading cities of Safi, Anfa or Azzemour. These sought the protection from local threats, in exchange for which they paid tribute to Portugal. In 1450, the Portuguese Crown signed an agreement with the rulers of Anfa and Safi to secure a supply of wheat from the surrounding regions of al-Shawyyia and Doukkala. This agreement was extended to Salé in 1455. Portuguese trading agents continued active in the region engaging with local authorities and in 1460 Safi formally seceded from the Marinid sultanate and signed a treaty of alliance with king Afonso V of Portugal. Anfa later rejected its ties with Portugal, harboured pirates, refused entry to Portuguese ships and was destroyed in 1468 in retaliation. The importance of Azzemour then increased greatly as result, and it became the main port for the export of wheat to Portugal. In 1500 the city harboured 5,000 households, with an estimated population of 23,000. Doukkala had an estimated population of 600,000 by the 16th century. Afterwards the Portuguese captured several other coastal towns in the north, such as Ksar el-Seghir in 1458, Tangier and Asilah and 1471.

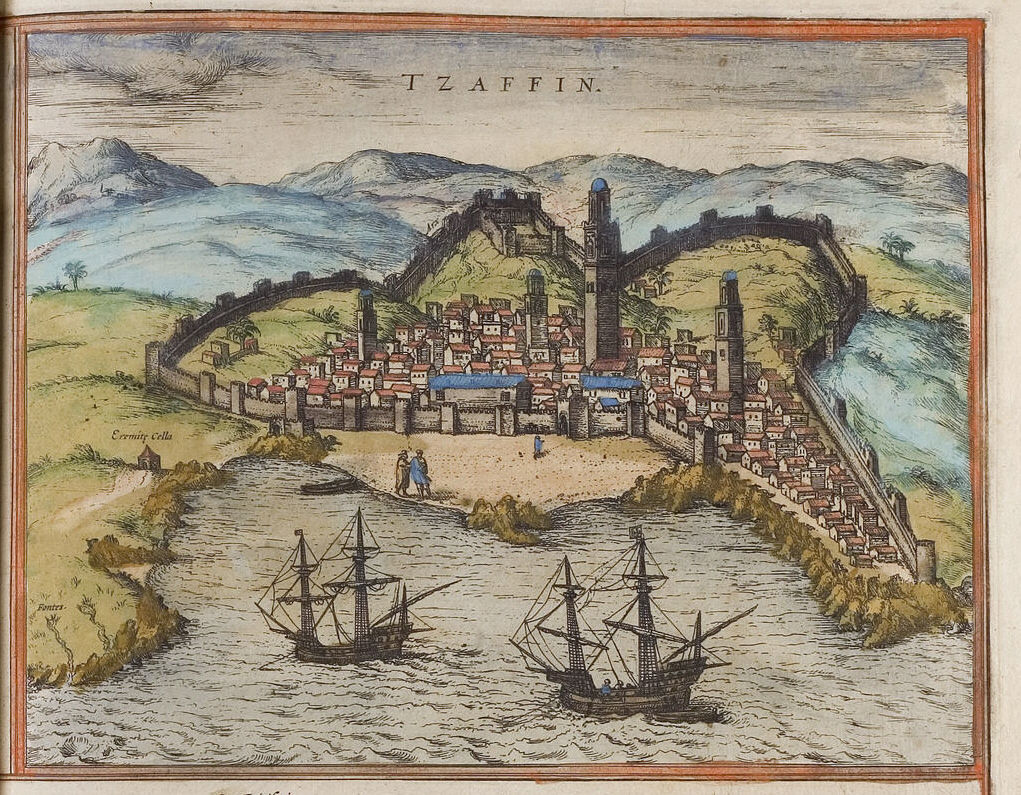
Safi in the 16th century.

Safi was the main commercial city in Doukkala and the port which served the city of Marrakesh, therefore a preferred harbour for European vessels. Yet internal dissent continued within the southern costal cities, with different factions defending different policies and vying for control, until eventually Safi refused to pay tribute to the Portugal. As a result, king Manuel of Portugal had Safi captured in 1507.

The creation of the Protectorate of Doukkala was due to the action of the Portuguese captain of Safi, Nuno Fernandes de Ataíde, who was able to broker a pact with the tribes of the region with the aid of Yahya u-Ta'fuft, made commander of Muslim auxiliaries in Portuguese service. "The amount of productive land brought under control in this way was anything but insignificant. The legendary captain Ataide of Safi, who, with the help of Yahya-u-Ta'fuft, frequently organized and conducted raids with parties of between 500 and 2,000 men, was so successful in compelling obedience to his rule that Portuguese influence extended for a time as far as the hawz (irrigated hinterland) of Marrakesh. The Hintata Berber amirs who then ruled Marrakesh were powerless to stop these expeditions, and at one point watched helplessly as Yahya-u-Ta'fuft's men insolently banged their spears on the locked gates of the half-deserted city that had once been the capital of the mighty Almohad empire."

The Portuguese levied a tribute in cereal on the tribes of Doukkala and on average 1,568,000 kilos of wheat and 1,312,500 kilos of barley were delivered at Safi for export to Portugal every year, thereby reactivating the grain trade between Morocco and the Iberian Peninsula. In addition, the Portuguese used their navy to divert to their cities the trade in woven goods, copper, horses and salt, that were then exchanged for gold in Guinea. Moroccan wheat made up the bulk of items exported by the Portuguese to Iberia, and cloths about 40% of the items exported to Guinea.

In May 1516, Nuno Fernandes initiated a military expedition to punish the Moroccan tribe of Oulad Amrane, part of the tribal confederation of Doukkala. The Portuguese, supported by the Abda and other Doukkala tribes, initially achieved success. On their return, they captured many slaves.

The Oulad 'Amran leader, Rahu ben Xamut, pursued the group and shouted to the Moors, who were on the side of the Portuguese, inciting them to rebel against the Portuguese, who had done so much harm to them. Rahu attacked the vanguard, who were commanded by Nuno's son-of-law. Rahu approached him and killed him with a blow to the neck with a javelin. The allied tribes switched sides and joined forces with the Oulad Amrane. The Portuguese were subsequently massacred or captured by the Moroccans, including Nuno, and only a hundred men managed to escape.

== See also ==
- Yahya u-Ta'fuft
- Raid of Marrakesh (1515)
