= Chaouia expedition =

Chaouia Campaign
- Part of Moroccan–Portuguese conflicts
Date	August 1487
Location	Chaouia, Morocco
Result	Portuguese victory.

Belligerents
Kingdom of Portugal	Wattasid Morocco

Commanders and leaders
Dom Diogo Fernandes de Almeida; Dom João de Ataíde	Unknown

Strength
150 horse, 1,000 foot. 30 ships.	Unknown

Casualties and losses
Unknown	900 dead, 300 to 800 captives.

The Chaouia Expedition took place in 1487, when a Portuguese force landed at Anfa and pillaged the region between that city and Larache.

== History ==
In 1487, King John II of Portugal began preparing a fleet to conduct a surprise attack against Morocco, however the plan was dropped. Instead, the king decided to respond to an appeal made to him by Mawlāy Abū al-Ḥadjdjādj Yūsuf ibn Zayyān (Mulei Befageja in Portuguese), a close relative of the Wattasid Sultan, to conduct a punitive expedition against the inhabitants of Chaouia (Enxovia in Portuguese) between Anfa and Larache, who had revolted.

The expedition departed on August 1487 carrying 150 horsemen and 1000 infantry among crossbowmen and arquebusiers, under the overall command of Dom Diogo Fernandes de Almeida, with Dom João de Ataíde as second-in-command. It anchored in the harbour of Anfa, destroyed in a previous attack in 1469, and Dom Diogo sent scouts or spies ashore to reconnoitre the land.

A number of Andaluzi horsemen joined the Portuguese. Having identified a number of settlements inland, the Portuguese disembarked that night and proceeded to devastate the villages and camps along the coast between Anfa and a region north of Sebou River and five leagues to the south of Larache, which the Portuguese identified as "Alagoas", killing 900 and capturing 300, 400 or 900 persons, horses and cattle.

== See also ==
- Conquest of Ceuta
- Anfa Expedition (1468)
- Conquest of Asilah
- Portuguese Asilah
- Portuguese Tangier
