= Martim Afonso de Melo =

Portuguese nobleman

- Lord
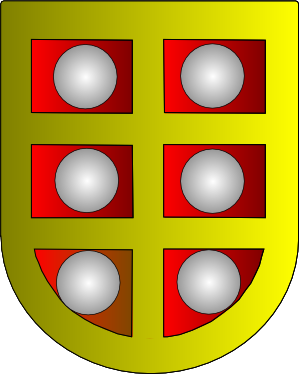
- Coat of Arms of Mello
- Born: 1360; Évora, Portugal
- Died: 1432 (aged 71–72); Portugal
- Noble family: Mello

Martim Afonso de Melo (1360–1432) was a Portuguese nobleman, Lord of Arega and Barbacena. He served as Alcaide of Évora, and Guarda-mor of John I of Portugal.

== Biography ==
Born in Évora, he was the son of Vasco Martins de Melo and Maria Afonso de Brito. Martim married twice, the first with Beatriz Pimentel, daughter of Juan Afonso Pimentel y Vasques da Fonseca, Count of Benavente, and Joana Telles de Menezes.

His second marriage was to Briolanja de Sousa, granddaughter of Vasco Martins de Sousa and Inês Dias Manuel, daughter Sancho Manuel de Villena and Inés Díaz de Toledo. She was granddaughter of Juan Manuel, Prince of Villena, and Inés de Castañeda.
