= Vasco Martins de Melo =

Portuguese nobleman

- Lord
- Born: 1310s Portugal
- Died: 9 May 1388; Portugal

Vasco Martins de Melo (-1388) was a Portuguese noblemen, Lord of Castanheira. He served as Alcaide-mor of Évora.

He was the son of Martim Afonso de Melo, 4th Lord of Melo, and Marinha Vasques de Albergaria, and grandson of Afonso Mendes de Melo. He was married to Teresa Correia daughter of Gonçalo Gomes de Azevedo. His second wife was Maria Afonso de Brito daughter of Martim Afonso de Brito and Isabel Afonso.
