= Siege of Agadir (1533) =

- Part of Moroccan–Portuguese conflicts
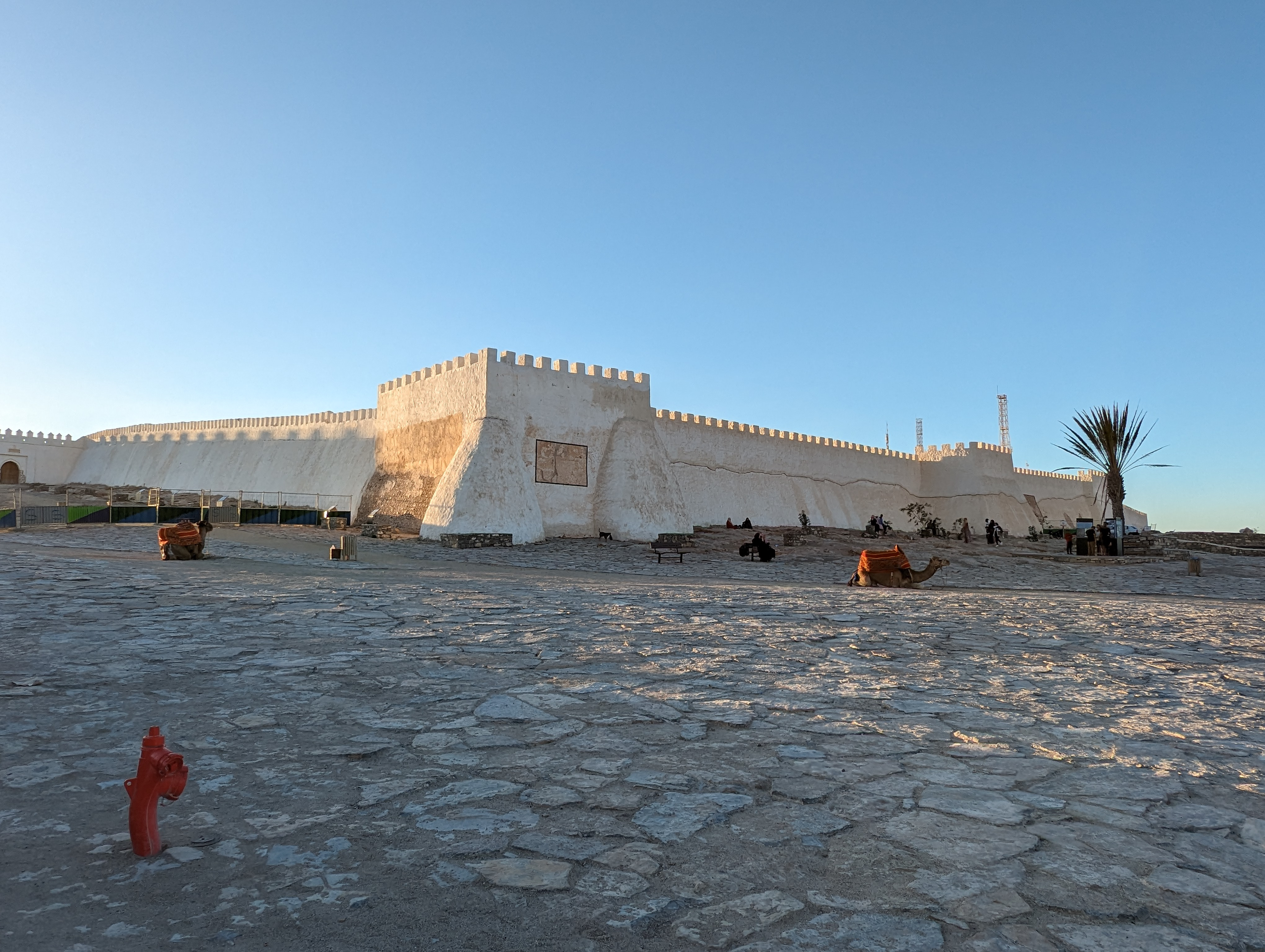
Date	April–March of 1533
Location	Agadir, Kingdom of Portugal
Result	Portuguese victory

Belligerents
Kingdom of Portugal	Saadi Sultanate

Commanders and leaders
Unknown	Mohammed al-Shaykh

Strength
Unknown	12,000 men

Casualties and losses
Unknown	Unknown

The siege of Agadir in 1533 was a military confrontation started by the troops of Mohammed al-Shaykh against the Portuguese fortress of Santa Cruz do Cabo da Gué. The Portuguese resisted the siege.

== History ==
The Santa Cruz do Cabo de Gué fortress was built in 1505 by João Lopes de Sequeira but sold to Manuel I of Portugal in 1512.

Mohammed al-Shaykh had begun to dominate the lords and tribes of southern Morocco, so the Portuguese in Agadir saw any supplies from the interior to the fortress grounds cut off and reduced. The Muslim leader intended to conquer Agadir to obtain a port that would allow him to export the sugar produced in Suz and understood the prestige he had to gain from the expulsion of Christians from that place. Many foreign merchants, French, Castilian and Genoese, smuggled weapons to him.

Since 1531, the fortress of Santa Cruz had been under pressure from the surrounding tribes and a siege was anticipated. Mohammed al-Shaykh fortified himself in two villages near Santa Cruz, where a large number of warriors had gathered since the beginning of 1533. Portuguese spies informed the garrison of the enemy's movements and, in the fortress, the Portuguese were already spending the nights in prevention and with close watch, followed by nightly peals from the bell tower.

On a certain day at the end of April or beginning of May, the fortress walls were scaled by surprise, the captain was murdered in his quarters and the keep was invaded. The garrison and residents rushed to the castle, the tower door was opened with an axe and the Muslims were expelled, many throwing themselves from the top of the tower onto the beach. Once the tower was recovered, the Portuguese began to fire artillery, which was joined by rifle fire and the large crowd of Muslims that had gathered around the fortress was dispersed.

When they were already celebrating their victory, a man approached the gunpowder barrels and was able to destroy a wall in the fortress.

Fortunately for the Portuguese, the walls fell inwards without filling the moat, and the keep did not collapse. The fortress wall was open almost to the ground, but the great smoke that the explosion caused was carried by the wind towards the Muslims, which confused them about what had happened, and two hours later when the smoke disappeared, the Portuguese survivors had filled part of the breach with many items found inside the fortress.

When the Muslims returned, they killed many Christians, but these, protected by mattresses, continued to work, even during the night. They built a wall with different materials almost as high as it was before. And before dawn, two men changed the texture of the wall on the outside, making it look like it was made of stone, just as it looked the day before. Thus they deceived the Muslim invaders, who attributed the feat to witchcraft. Only 40 men were able to fight on the Portuguese side.

Mohammed al-Shaykh retreated with his men three days later.

The fortress of Santa Cruz would be besieged again by Mohammed al-Shaykh in 1541 and lost on that occasion.

== See also ==
- Portuguese Empire
- Siege of Mazagan (1562)
- Portuguese Asilah
- Portuguese Tangier
- Portuguese conquest of Ceuta
- Battle of Alcácer Quibir
- Fall of Agadir
