= Battle of Mamora (1515) =

- Part of the Moroccan–Portuguese conflicts
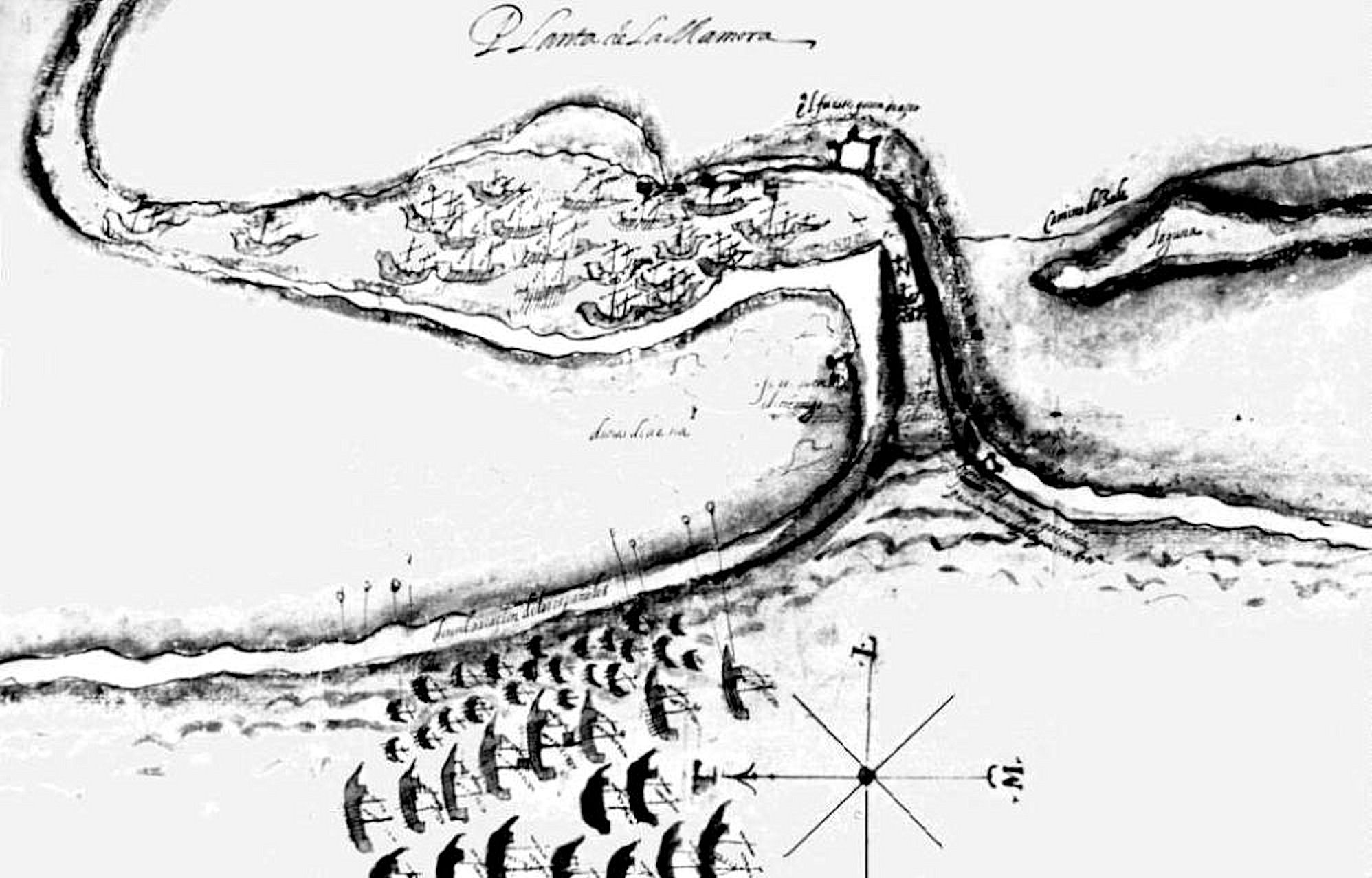
- Drawing of Mamora in 1621.
Date	July 1515
Location	Mehdya, Morocco
Result	Moroccan victory

Belligerents
(Portugal) Portuguese Empire	(Morocco) Wattasid Sultanate

Commanders and leaders
(Portugal) D. António de Noronha	(Morocco) Muhammad al-Burtuqali (Morocco) Moulay Nasr

Strength
8,000 men 200 ships	30,000 infantry 3,000 cavalry

Casualties and losses
4,000 killed 100 ships lost 52 captured cannons	Unknown

The Battle of Mamora was a military engagement between the Wattasid Moroccans and the Portuguese army which landed in Mamora. The Wattasids were victorious, and the Portuguese were decisively defeated.

== Prelude ==
In 1515, Manuel I of Portugal sent an armada consisting of 8,000 men and 200 ships, led by D. António de Noronha, Count of Linhares^{[a]}, with a task of capturing and building a fort in Mehdya, naming it Sao João da Mamora. Arriving there, the low tide and shifting sandbars left the Portuguese ships stranded. The Moroccans led by Sultan Muhammad al-Burtuqali attacked the Portuguese with an army of three thousand cavalry and thirty thousand infantry.

== Battle ==
The Moroccan counter-attack came in July when the sultan's younger brother and the grand vizier Moulay Nasr who besieged the Portuguese from the north, the sultan came and besieged them from the south bank of Sebou River the sultan concentrated his artillery on the Portuguese ships while his brother invested on the fort, the sultan watched his artillery hit one of the ships with an incredible shot, within an hour the whole nature of the siege changed, the escape route was blocked, no longer being threatened by Portuguese cannon ships, the sultan ordered twelve light artillery to move straight to the river shore, the Moroccan pressed the Portuguese with Explosive grenades close to the Portuguese lines, the Moroccans stop firing and the Portuguese began to dismantle the fort and start escaping in small boats, However seeing the Portuguese fleeing, the sultan gave signal and attacked the Portuguese, by the end of afternoon the water of Sebou turned red as Leo Africanus who witnessed the siege said:

For three days the sea spouted waves of blood.

Portuguese casualties were heavy, 4,000 were killed and 100 ships were lost.

== Aftermath ==
The sultan returned to Fez victorious with a column of soldiers escorting 52 captured cannons, the sultan received emissaries from tribal leaders and sheiks who warmly welcomed them and congratulated the sultan for his victory, the captured guns would be used in the Siege of Asilah in 1516 however the siege failed.

It was a decisive victory for Wattasids, it shattered Manuel's and Portuguese hopes to conquer entire Morocco. Seeing the Portuguese pride was shattered, the captains of the forts ordered raids after raids into the interior of Morocco to prove the Portuguese military had not been broken, the governor of Safi Nuno Fernandes de Ataide launched a raid into Oulad Umran tribe however he was defeated and killed and only 100 men escaped.

== Notes ==
- ^[a] not to be confused with António de Noronha, the 25th Viceroy of Portuguese India.
