= Battle of Tednest =

- Part of Moroccan–Portuguese conflicts
| Date | 1514 |
| Location | Tednest (near El Hanchane) |
| Result | Portuguese victory |

Belligerents
| Portuguese Empire | Saadi Sultanate |

Commanders and leaders
| Nuno Fernandes de Ataíde; Yahya ben Tafuft | Abu Abdallah al-Qaim |

Strength
| 100–400 Portuguese horsemen 2,000–3,000 Muslim horsemen 700 Arab footmen | 4,000 horse. |

Casualties and losses
| 120 dead. | 800 dead, 200 captives. |

The Battle of Tednest was an armed engagement that took place in 1514 near the town of Tednest in southern Morocco, involving Portuguese forces supported by Moroccan auxiliaries against Moroccan forces under Saadi sheriff Abu Abdallah al-Qaim. The Portuguese were victorious and Tednest was sacked.

== The Battle ==
In 1513, the Moroccan coastal city of Azzemour was captured by a large Portuguese fleet under the command of the Duke of Braganza. Still that same year, several settlements around the banks of Oum Er-Rbia River such as Bencafiz and Tafuf were devastated by the Portuguese, who captured many POWs and ample warspoils, such as cattle of various kinds.

Tednest was the main settlement in the Haha region, which at the time also comprised the government of Shiedma. As a walled town containing about 3000 inhabitants, numerous mosques, crafts, a Jewish quarter with 100 homes, and a hospital for the poor. It was the residence of Saadian Sheriff Mohammed ibn Ahmed and his two sons, who had built a palace in the town. It presented a threat to Portuguese held Azamor and Safim, which were 22 leagues or about 76 English statute miles away, hence the Portuguese governor of Safim Nuno Fernandes de Ataíde sought to neutralize it.

For the projected attack he gathered 100 Portuguese horsemen and was supported by Yahya Ben Tafuft ahead of an auxiliary force numbering 3000 Muslim horsemen and 800 Arabs on foot.

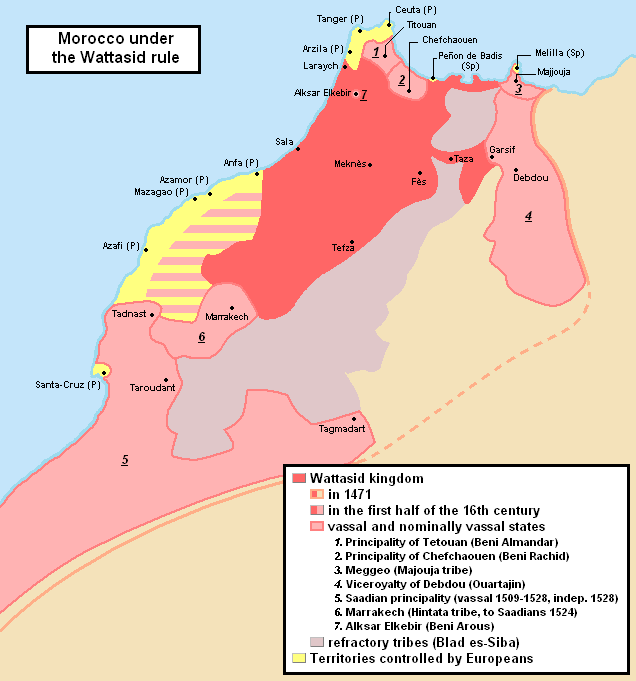
Morocco in the first half of the 16th century.

Aware of their approach, the Shariff Abu Abdallah al-Qaim marched out with 4000 horses and met Ataíde and Ben Tafuft eight leagues away from Safim, however he was routed, Yahya Ben Tafuft having taken the vanguard and the initiative against him.

== Aftermath ==
After the battle, the inhabitants of Tednest abandoned the city and fled to the mountains, marching from there to Marrakesh, leaving vast spoil behind which was captured by Ataíde and Ben Tafuft. The Portuguese governor of Azamor Dom João de Meneses then arrived with 720 horses and 1000 feet to support Ataíde. The city and its walls were razed and Ataíde negotiated a treaty with the inhabitants that remained.

Tednest was the most important of all the minor Moroccan towns, and although the settlement was rebuilt in 1516, it completely dropped out of historical records for the following centuries after the Portuguese attack. It was later rebuilt and repopulated by Jews.

== See also ==
- Saadi dynasty
- Portuguese Asilah
- Portuguese Tangier
