= Martim Afonso de Brito =

Portuguese nobleman

- Knight
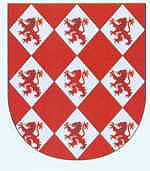
- Born: 14th-century Kingdom of Portugal
- Died: 14th-century Kingdom of Portugal
- Father: João Afonso de Brito
- Mother: Isabel Afonso

Martim Afonso de Brito (14th-century) was a Portuguese nobleman, member of the Court of Afonso IV. He was appointed Canon of the Archdiocese of Braga.

== Biography ==
Martim was the son of João Afonso de Brito, bishop of Lisbon, and Isabel Afonso.
