= Battle of Azemmour =

Battle in 1513

- Part of Moroccan–Portuguese conflicts
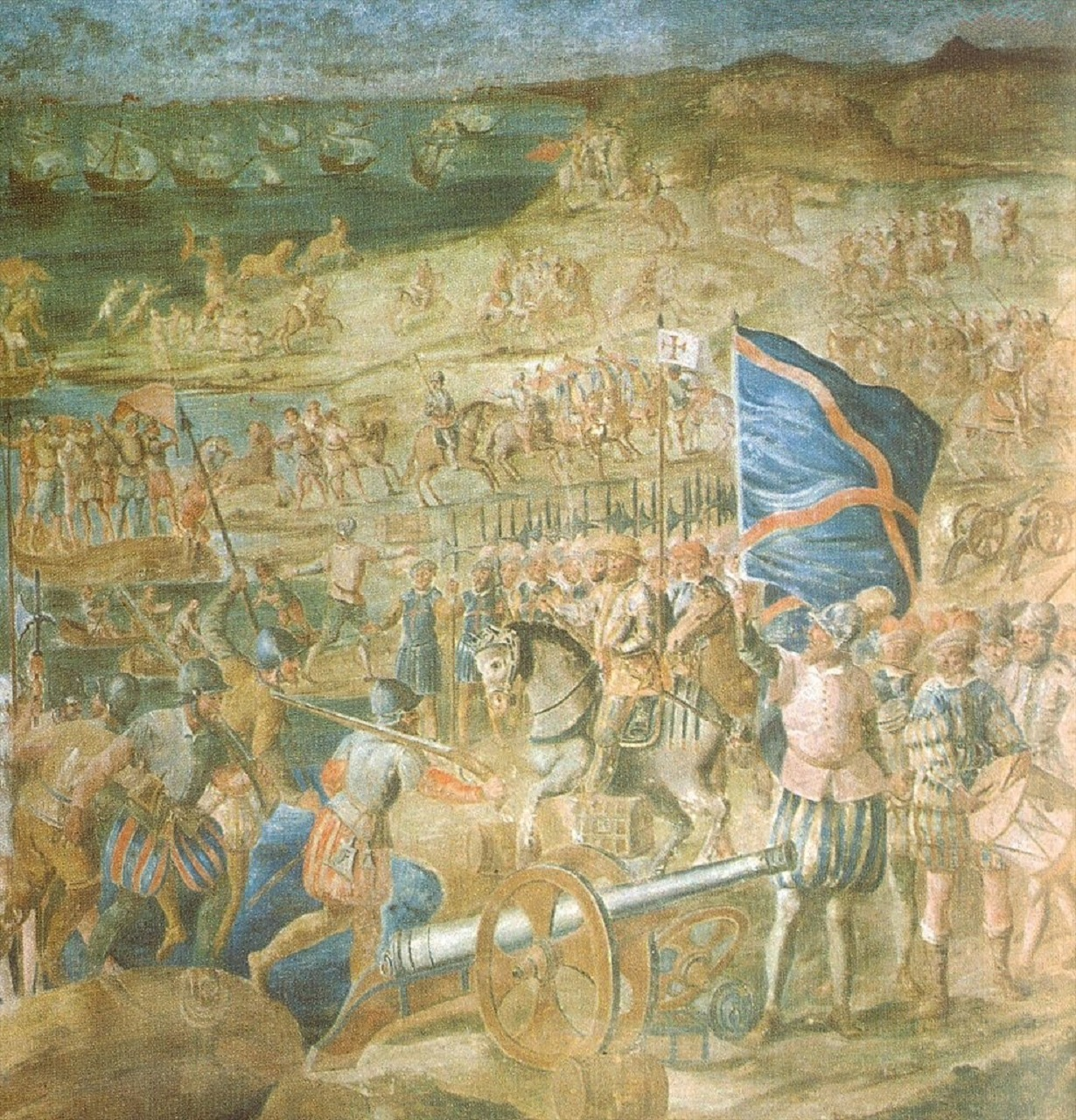
- Landing of the forces of the Duke of Bragança, during the Conquest of Azemmour.
Date	28–29 August 1513
Location	Azemmour, Morocco
Result	Portuguese victory

Belligerents
Portuguese Empire	Sultanate of Morocco

Commanders and leaders
James, Duke of Braganza	Moulay Zayam of Azemmour

Strength
18,000 infantry 2,450 cavalry 400 ships	Unknown

Casualties and losses
Unknown	Unknown

The Battle of Azemmour took place in Morocco, on 28 and 29 August 1513 between the Portuguese Empire and the Moroccan Wattasid dynasty.

Azemmour, dependent on the King of Fes, even enjoying of great autonomy, paid vassalage to the king João II of Portugal since 1486. The disagreements generated with the governor Moulay Zayam, who refused to pay tribute to Manuel I of Portugal and prepared an army to defend itself, causing King Manuel to send a fleet to that city on 15 August 1513.

On 1 September the Portuguese army, led by James, Duke of Braganza, took the city without resistance.

Prior to his voyage of circumnavigation, Ferdinand Magellan fought in this battle, where he received a severe knee wound. After taking leave without permission, he fell out of favor at the Portuguese royal court.

The battle resulted in the conquest of Azemmour, which was named Azamor by the Portuguese.
