= Anfa expedition (1468) =

1468 Portuguese razing of Anfa, Morocco

Anfa Expedition (1468)
- Part of Moroccan–Portuguese conflicts
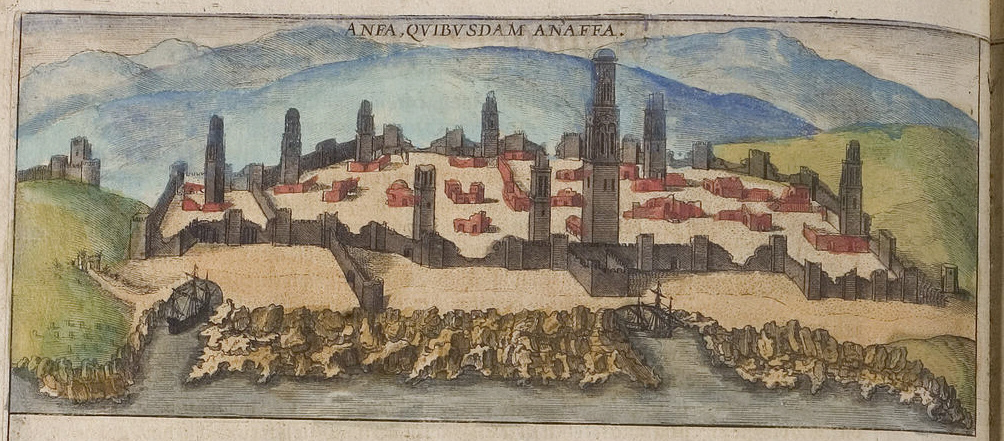
- Anfa in 1572, depicted in Civitates Orbis Terrarum by Georg Braun.
Date	1468
Location	Anfa, Morocco
Result	Portuguese victory

Belligerents
Kingdom of Portugal	Wattasid Morocco

Commanders and leaders
Duke of Viseu	Unknown.

Strength
10,000 men, 50 ships.	Unknown

Casualties and losses
None.	Unknown

The Anfa Expedition of 1468 took place when a Portuguese fleet commanded by Duke Fernando of Viseu razed the town of Anfa, then one of the most important cities in Morocco and a pirate haven.

== History ==
Anfa was among the most prosperous cities in Morocco, and owed its wealth to both the export of foodstuffs such as wheat grown in the highly fertile surrounding regions, and the fact that it was a notorious pirate haven. It imported fine silk clothes, gold and silver currency from Granada, and featured a high number of merchants and noble residences. According to Leo Africanus, ships departed from its harbour to raid the coasts of the Iberian peninsula.

Wishing to distinguish himself through a feat of arms, Duke Ferdinand of Beja and of Viseu, heir of Prince Henry the Navigator, Duke of Beja and of Viseu and governor of both the Order of Santiago and Order of Christ, accepted to fulfill the desire of King Afonso V to destroy the city and neutralize the threat it posed. Duke Ferdinand was experienced in the African theater, and had already previously distinguished himself fighting at Alcácer Ceguer and Tangier.

Before attacking the city, Duke Fernando dispatched a fidalgo of his houselhold, knight of Santiago and alcaide-mor of Sines Estevão da Gama (father of Vasco da Gama) to spy the city disguised as a fig merchant. Gama duly fulfilled his mission, observing the defenses of the city as he sold a cargo of figs from Algarve across the city. The exact numbers involved in the expedition are not known but may have involved as many as 10 000 men and about 50 ships.

As the Portuguese fleet approached the city, the inhabitants evacuated it and fled to Rabat and Salé. The city was then sacked and almost completely demolished by the Portuguese army, some sources stating the Portuguese encountered little resistance, others none at all. In the words of Leo Africanus:

...they assaulted the city with such impetus that they sacked it and exploded it whole in just a day, burning houses, tearing down walls in an infinite places; still today it remains unpopulated, and when I visited it I could not contain my tears. Most houses, shops and mosques remain standing and wound ones eyes with their ruin, offering a most sad display.

Anfa remained abandoned for three centuries. The region of Anfa would again be attacked by the Portuguese in 1487.

== See also ==
- Portuguese conquest of Ceuta
- Conquest of Asilah
- Portuguese Asilah
- Portuguese Tangier
