= Yahya u-Ta'fuft =

Leader of Doukkala in Morocco (died 1520)

Yaḥya ū-Taʿfuft (Arabic: يحيى أوتعفوفت; died 1520) was a Moroccan alcaide of the Doukkala region in the service of the King of Portugal.

== Early life ==
u-Ta'fuft was from the village of Sarnu near Safi. Portuguese sources at the time describe him as bárbaro (Berber) rather than alarve (Arab). His Berber origin is corroborated by his name u-Ta'fuft referring to the village of Tafuf or Tanfut which is a Berber toponym.

== Sources ==
- Racine, Matthew T. (2001). "Service and Honor in Sixteenth-Century Portuguese North Africa: Yahya-u-Taʿfuft and Portuguese Noble Culture". The Sixteenth Century Journal. 32 (1): 67–90. doi:10.2307/2671395. ISSN 0361-0160.
- Cornell, Vincent J. (1990). "Socioeconomic Dimensions of Reconquista and Jihad in Morocco: Portuguese Dukkala and the Sadid Sus, 1450-1557". International Journal of Middle East Studies. 22 (4): 379–418. ISSN 0020-7438.
- Francisco, Felipe Benjamin (2024-05-07). "Some Moroccan Dialectal Features on a Letter by Yaḥya u-Taʕfuft (16th Century)". In Ramos, Carmen Berlinches; Guerrero, Jairo; Fernández, Montserrat Benítez (eds.). AIDA Granada: A Pomegranate of Arabic Varieties. Prensas de la Universidad de Zaragoza. pp. 229–243. ISBN 978-84-1340-829-3.
