= Portuguese conquest of Ceuta =

1415 conflict between Portugal and Marinid Morocco

- Part of Reconquista
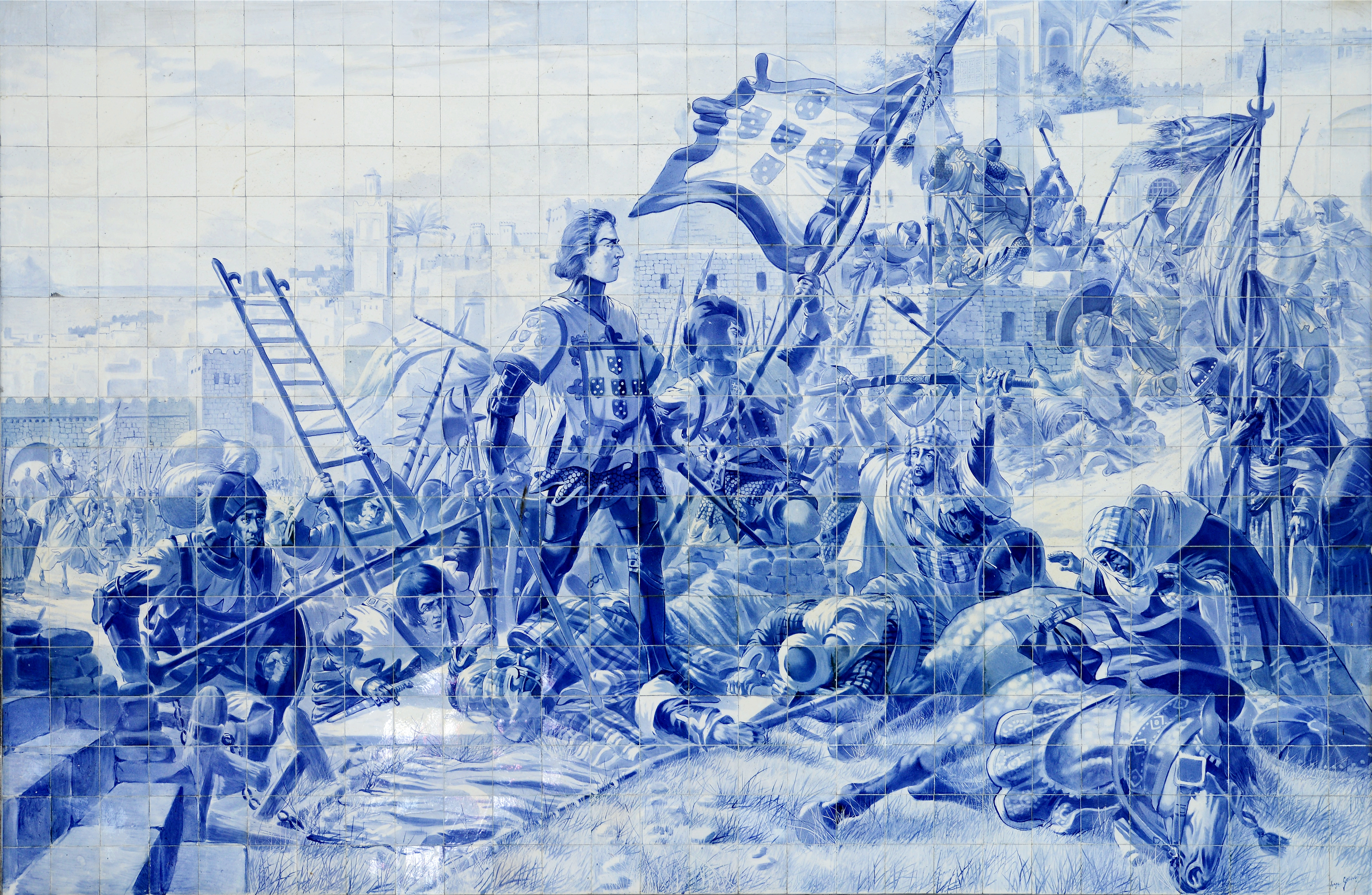
- Panel of azulejos by Jorge Colaço (1864–1942) at the São Bento railway station, depicting Prince Henry the Navigator during the conquest of Ceuta
Date	21 August 1415
Location	Ceuta, Marinid Sultanate of Morocco (now Spanish enclave in Morocco) 35°53′45″N 5°18′01″W
Result	Portuguese victory
Territorial changes	Establishment of Portuguese Ceuta; Beginning of the Portuguese Empire

Belligerents
Kingdom of Portugal	Marinid dynasty

Commanders and leaders
John I of Portugal (WIA); Nuno Álvares Pereira	Salah Ben Salah

Strength
45,000 or 50,000 men. About 200 ships.	Unknown

Casualties and losses
At least 8 killed. Unknown losses from disease	Several thousands killed or taken prisoner 1 cannon captured

Portuguese forces under the command of King John I conquered the North African city of Ceuta from the Marinid Sultanate on 21 August 1415. The city's defenses fell under Portuguese control after a carefully prepared attack, and the successful capture of the city marked the beginning of the Portuguese Empire. Ceuta remained under Portuguese control until it was transferred to Spain in 1668.

== Background ==
Ceuta is a North African coastal city strategically located on the Strait of Gibraltar. In the early 15th century, the city featured rich trade with the Levant, Egypt, Libya, abundant tuna fishing stocks in its surrounding waters as well as coral, which constituted its main export industry, besides being also a notorious pirate haven, where Berber pirates sold their prey after raiding Iberian coasts and shipping. It had, however, to import grain for its sustenance. Ceuta's position opposite the straits of Gibraltar gave it control of one of the main outlets of the trans-African Sudanese gold trade; and it could enable Portugal to flank its most dangerous rival, Castile. It was defended by a composite system of walls, built and added to by various Islamics dynasties throughout the centuries, most recently the Marinids, and with a high number of gates which could prove difficult to defend. It included a strong citadel built by the Marinids. Yet by the 15th century Ceuta had markedly declined from what it had once been in the 13th century, as its population had since then shrunk, trade and intellectual life had withered and it several of its districts fell to semi-dereliction.

The political situation in the Maghreb fell to disorder shortly before the Portuguese conquest. Relations between the Marinids of Morocco and the Nasrids of Granada in southern Iberia were strained after Abu Said Uthman III had attempted to capture Gibraltar in 1411, and Yusuf III of Granada in response instigated a revolt in Morocco, by supporting a rival claimant to the throne. Fighting continued throughout 1412, ten cities were destroyed and Fez lost control of much northern Morocco. A new crisis occurred in 1414, as the neighbouring Kingdom of Tlemcen managed to briefly install Ahmad Ibn Abi Salim as governor of Ceuta, but he was ousted by Salah ben Salah, though Ibn Abi Salim still took the citys naval forces with him. An outbreak of plague also decimated Moroccan population about this time.

European landings in north Africa were not unheard-of. In 1270, king Louis IX landed an army in Tunis during the Eighth Crusade. In 1390, Mahdia was attacked by a Franco-Genoese force in what became known as the Barbary Crusade. More successful than either, in 1399 the Castilians under Hugo de Mendoza sacked Tetouan, a known pirate haven.

After defeating a Castilian army that had invaded Portugal in 1385 at the Battle of Aljubarrota, the recently crowned King John I of Portugal signed a peace treaty with Castille, in 1411. With the end of hostilities, the king was then faced with a restless aristocracy with diminishing incomes and who depended on military service. Even before signing peace with its only neighbour, King John I had cast an eye at gaining Ceuta and began preparations as early as 1409. The chief promoter of the Ceuta expedition was João Afonso, royal overseer of finance. The children of King John, prince-heir Edward, prince Peter and Prince Henry (later nicknamed 'the Navigator') wished to be armed knights, and towards that objective king John had ordered various tournaments to take place in which the most renowned knights in the world were invited to join, but at the suggestion of the experienced knight João Afonso de Alenquer the princes were persuaded that it would be more honourable to win their spurs by proceeding to Ceuta. They eagerly supported the project and effectively lobbied in its favour, as the prospect of taking Ceuta offered them an opportunity to win wealth and glory.

== Preparations for the conquest ==
Preparations for the conquest of Ceuta, such as the gathering of materials and money started years beforehand and carried out slowly, though the objective was kept a secret. No taxes were raised because such a course of action demanded a gathering of Cortes and it would risk leaking the objective of the projected expedition. Nor was currency debased. Loans were taken, foreign ships chartered, galleys repaired and new ones built, until 30 had been assembled by the admiral of Portugal Carlos Pesanha, and expenses closely controlled.

Prince Henry, later surnamed 'the Navigator' was tasked with organizing the recruitment of men in the provinces of Beira and Trás-os-Montes and assemble them in the city of Porto. Henry's brother Peter was tasked with enlisting in the southern provinces of Extremadura, Alentejo and Algarve, with the gathering point at Lisbon. Prince-heir Duarte handled paperwork and judicial matters, though he fell into depression.

=== Faux embassy to Sicily ===
In order to scout the defenses of Ceuta beforehand, King John nominated the Prior of Crato Dom Álvaro Gonçalves Camelo as ambassador to the then regent and heir of the Kingdom of Sicily Blanche of Navarre, but they were to stop at Ceuta to study its defenses. He was to take two galleys commanded by general-of-the-sea Afonso Furtado de Mendonça and officially propose to Blanche the marriage of Prince Peter, but stop at Ceuta to take in supplies. They stopped at Ceuta for four days, and measured the depth of the harbour. Having successfully reached Sicily and received a negative reply, as King John had anticipated, they headed back to Portugal, again stopping at Ceuta.

After returning to Portugal, Camelo was received by John I in a public audience to hear the result of the mission to Sicily, in which the king pretended to be disappointed. At the royal Palace of Sintra Dom Álvaro drew for King John and the princes in private a map of Ceuta and its surrounding geography with sand and thread.

=== Disclosure of the plan to the privy council ===
Only after he was in possession of these precise informations about Ceuta did King John then disclose his intentions to capture Ceuta to his wife Queen Philippa of Lancaster. The Queen initially disapproved of king Johns plan. He then sought the valued opinion of the experienced Constable of Portugal, the renowned general Nuno Álvares Pereira, though only three years later. By occasion of a hunting trip in Montemor-o-Novo later, the king then disclosed the project to Nuno Álvares Pereira, who approved it in earnest.

Finally, the King disclosed the project to the highest members of the Court, at Torres Novas, to where he summoned the Queen, the princes, the Constable Dom Nuno Álvares Pereira, the royal chancellor João das Regras, the archbishop of Braga Dom Lourenço, the grandmaster of the Orders of Christ Dom Lopo Dias de Sousa, the grandmaster of the Portuguese order of Santiago Dom Fernando Afonso de Albuquerque, the grandmaster of Aviz Fernão Rodrigues de Sequeira, the prior of the Hospitallers Álvaro Gonçalves Camelo, the Marshal of Portugal Gonçalo Vasques Coutinho, lord Martim Afonso de Mello, and the royal ensign João Gomes da Silva. By order of the King, the Constable expressed his vote first, and as he voted in favor the rest of council then vote unanimously in favour too.

=== Faux embassy to Holland ===
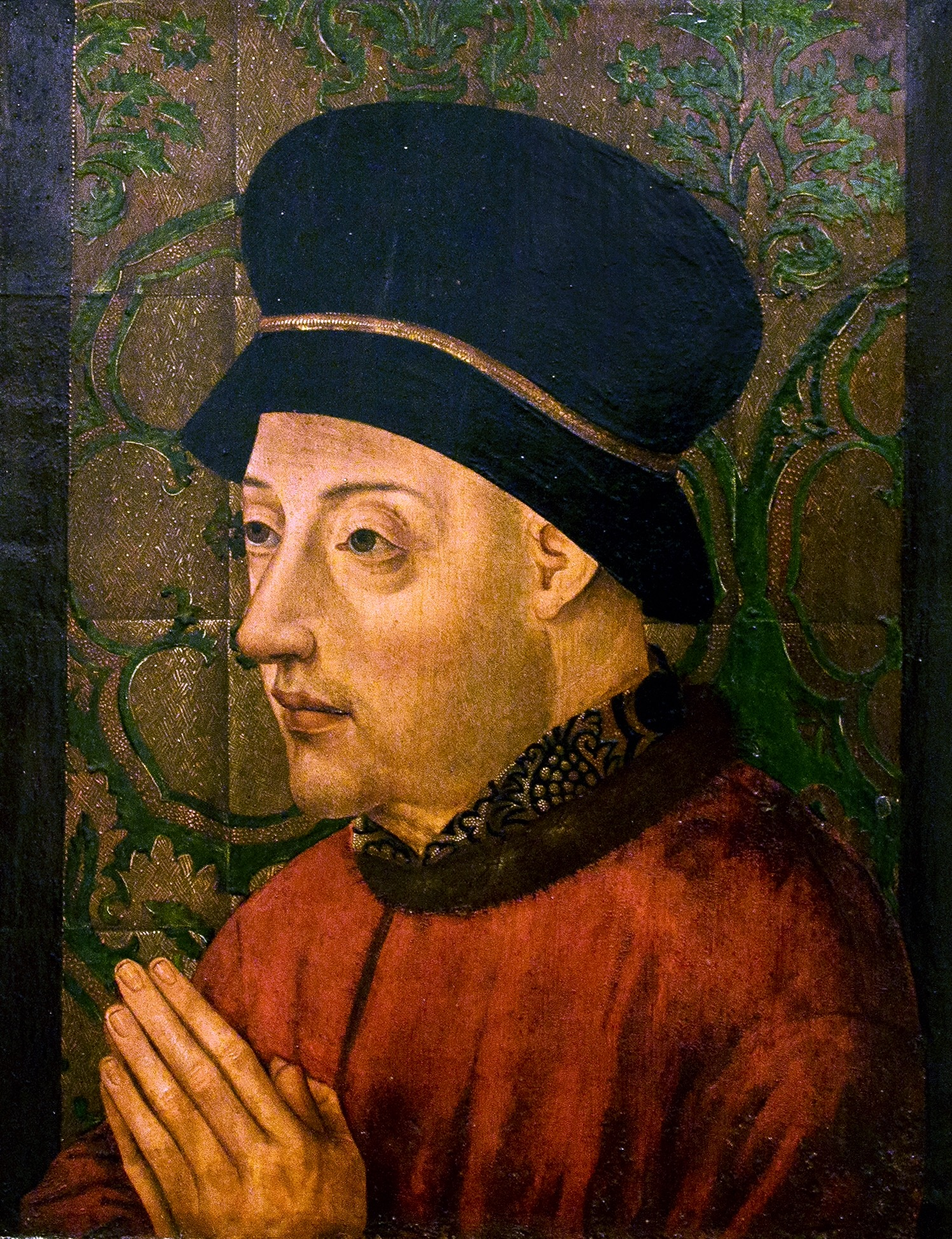
King John I of Portugal.

The success of the project depended on its secrecy. The secretive nature of the expedition caused numerous theories to rise among Portuguese society as to its true objective, some speculating the King meant to undertake a Crusade to the Levant, others to conquer the Kingdom of Sicily, still others (correctly) guessing Ceuta. By that point, rumours of the preparations being carried out in Portugal against a secret objective spread throughout Europe. The residents of Ibiza and Sicily made preparations to resist a possible Portuguese attack, in which they incurred considerable expense. Some French wrote to King Ferdinand of Aragon expressing their suspicion that the Portuguese were preparing to participate in the Hundred Years War alongside the English, in France. Genoese reports implied that the objective of the expedition was an attack on Seville.

King John II of Castile, King Ferdinand I of Aragon and the emir of Granada Yusuf III all sent embassies to the Portuguese Court enquiring on the purpose of King John's preparations; the Castilian and Aragonese ambassadors were reassured that the purpose of the armada aimed neither Kingdom, but the ambassador of Granada was only given evasive answers. As a result, the Granadine embassador advised the emir to reinforce his defences.

In order to conceal the true objective of the expedition, John dispatched Fernão Fogaça as an ambassador to the Count of Holland William VI, with the official mission of publicly demanding from the Count a compensation over a number of abuses the Hollanders had supposedly carried out at sea against Portuguese mariners. The Count had in fact been informed by King John of the true purpose of this phony embassy beforehand, hence he entertained Fogaça with a public audience in which he offered such a rude reply that it might be understood as a declaration of war. As a result, rumour thus spread that King John was about to depart on an expedition to attack Holland. Under cover of this plot, the king openly chartered ships in Galicia, Biscay, England and Germany, with news spreading throughout Christendom that Portugal was about to invade Holland.

=== Final gathering in Lisbon ===
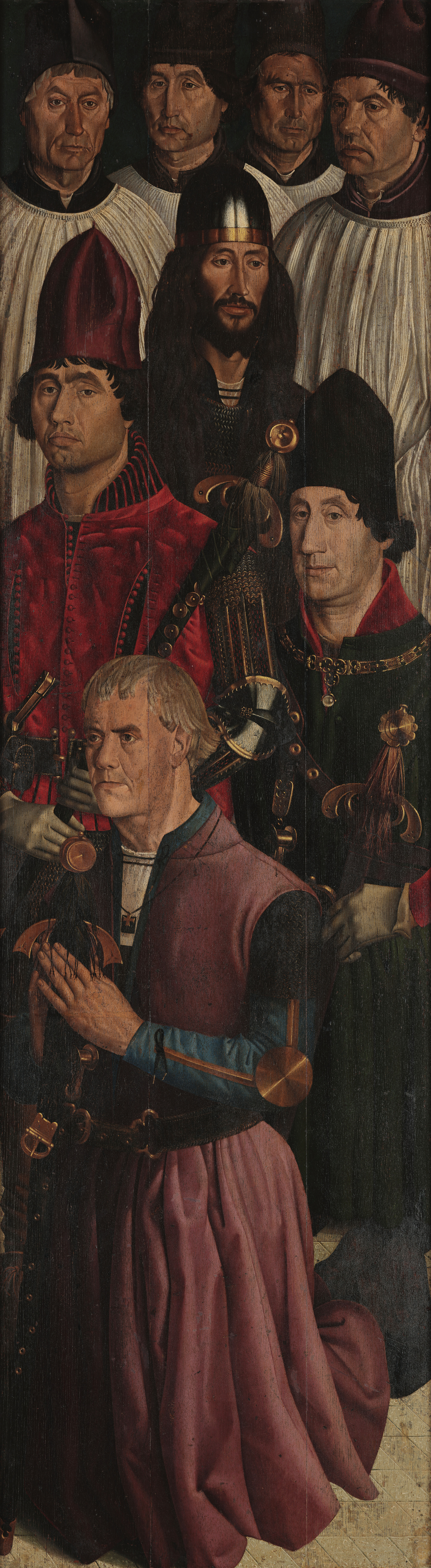
Portuguese knights depicted in the Saint Vincent Panels.

In the Spring of 1415, plague broke out in Lisbon, forcing the Court to relocate to the nearby town of Sacavém. On July 10, 1415, Prince Henry called at Lisbon with a fleet of 7 galleys and 20-26 transports bearing a numerous corps of well-equipped men. Among them was 90 year-old Aires Gonçalves de Figueiredo, who had fought in the Battle of River Salado and commanded a carrack.

The Portuguese fleet numbered about 200 ships of different kinds. It included 59 oarships, of which 15 were galleys, plus 33 carracks or cogs and 120 smaller vessels. It transported as many as 50,000 men, of which about 19,295 were soldiers. Of these, 5,385 men were part of the kings host, plus 9,000 infantry, presumably bearing spears or swords, 3,000 crossbowmen on foot and 1,900 mounted crossbowmen.

English, French and German mercenaries took part in the expedition. One German baron commanded 50 men of his household, while an Englishman by the name of Mondo (Mundy) commanded four ships.The expedition included among its ranks some of the most important persons in Portugal at the time besides the king, such as prince-heir Duarte, prince Peter, prince Henry, the Count of Barcelos Dom Afonso de Cascais, the Constable of Portugal Dom Nuno Álvares Pereira and his nephew Dom Álvaro Pereira, the Grandmaster of the Order of Christ Dom Lopo Dias de Sousa, the prior of the Knights Hospitaller Dom Álvaro Gonçalves Camelo, the Admiral Carlos Pessanha, the Count of Viana Dom Duarte de Meneses, the General of the Sea Afonso Furtado de Mendonça, the first Duke of Braganza Dom Afonso, the Marshal of Portugal Gonçalo Vascques Countinho and the Royal Ensign João Gomes da Silva, among others. All of the main noble houses in Portugal participated in the expedition, with the notable exception of the Lima family.

Shortly before their departure, Queen Phillippa fell ill from the plague. She died on July 19 1415 and her funeral took place the following day. The expedition was nearly called off, but King John decided to carry it through. A day of mourning was decreed, at the end of which Prince Henry commanded that all participants wear their best, the ships be decorated and trumpets be sounded with fanfare.

The grandmaster of the Order of Aviz was appointed to administer Portugal in the king's absence on July 23, and that day King John embarked on the royal galley. The fleet weighted anchor two days later on July 25 and departed from Lisbon, while the citizens and local inhabitants watched from the surrounding hills and beaches.

From Sacavém, the Aragonese spy Ruy Dias de Vega wrote a few days later to the King of Aragon Ferdinand I that the objective of the expedition was rumoured to be either Ceuta or Gibraltar.

== Itinerary of the Portuguese fleet ==
From the mouth of the Tagus River, the Portuguese fleet sailed south along the south-western coast of Portugal and rounded the Cape St. Vincent on July 26, and on the night of 27 it anchored at Lagos.

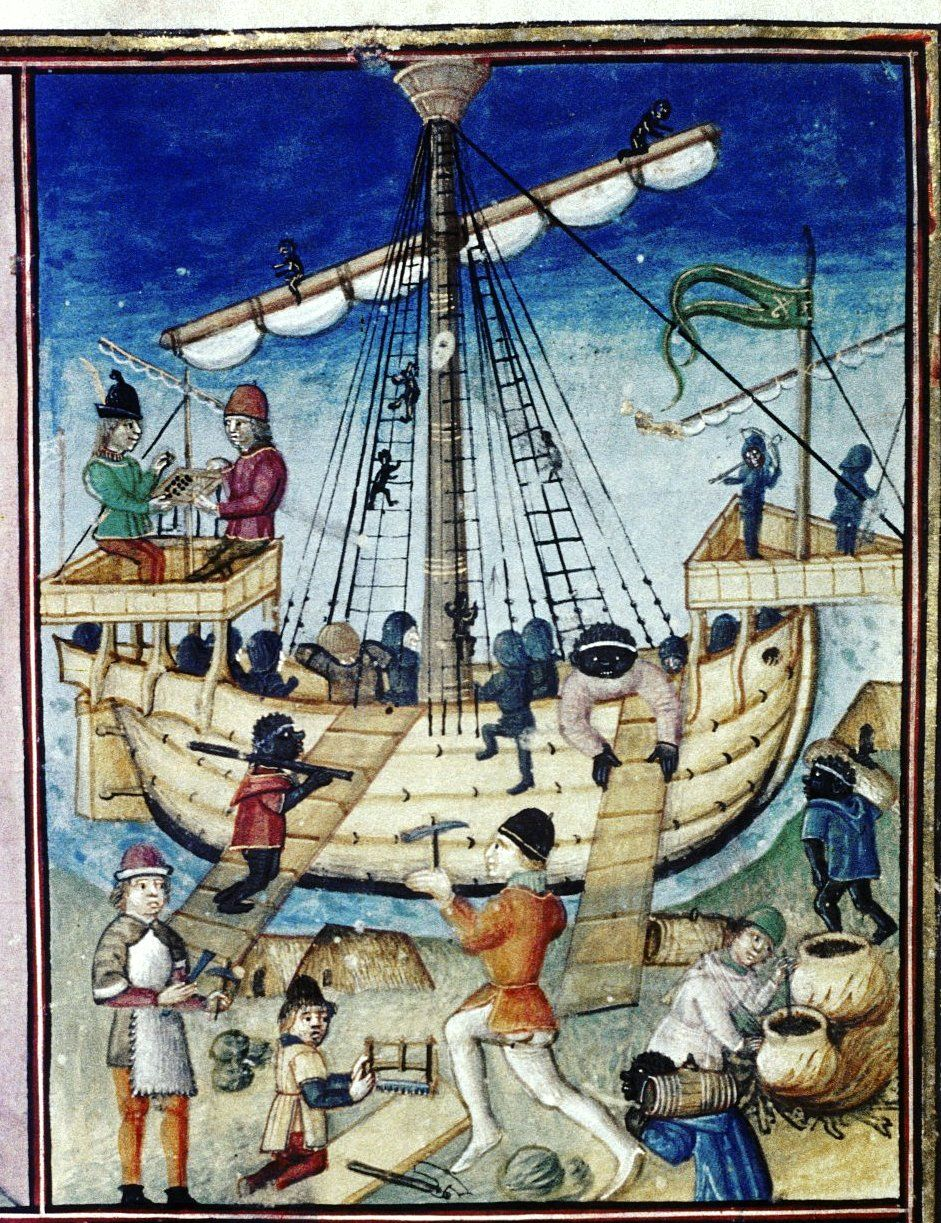
Miniature of a 15th century vessel.

The king disembarked at Lagos the day after arriving to hear Sunday mass, at the cathedral of Lagos by the royal chaplain the Franciscan João de Xira, who on the occasion read to the royal family and commanders the Crusade bull issued by the Pope in favour of all who would participate in the attack against Ceuta. Only then was the true objective of the expedition disclosed by João de Xira on his sermon, following orders of the king.

On 30 July the fleet weighted anchor. The weather forced it to call at nearby Faro however. As the wind blew weak, the fleet remained by that city till August 7, when they got on their way again. By late afternoon the Portuguese sighted Cape Espartel and turned out to sea, that night entered the Strait of Gibraltar and anchored by the Castilian town of Tarifa. Many members of the expedition were by that point still convinced the objective was Sicily.

Tarifa was then governed by the Portuguese Martim Fernandes Porto-Carreiro, who offered the king supplies and livestock as refreshments. Since the fleet was well provided, King John refused the gift, but Porto-Carreiro was so offended by such rejection that he had the animals slaughtered and abandoned on the beach. As a compensation for this spirited act, the King and the royal princes gifted Porto-Carreiro rich jewels and 1000 dobras.

From Tarifa, the fleet next anchored at Algeciras, then belonging to the Emirate of Granada, subject to the Marinids. King John ordered the attack on Ceuta from Algeciras on August 12, but when they sailed out strong currents and contrary winds blew the Portuguese carracks east almost as far as Málaga, while the oarships proceeded to Ceuta and anchored in its harbour still on that day.

== Attack on Ceuta ==
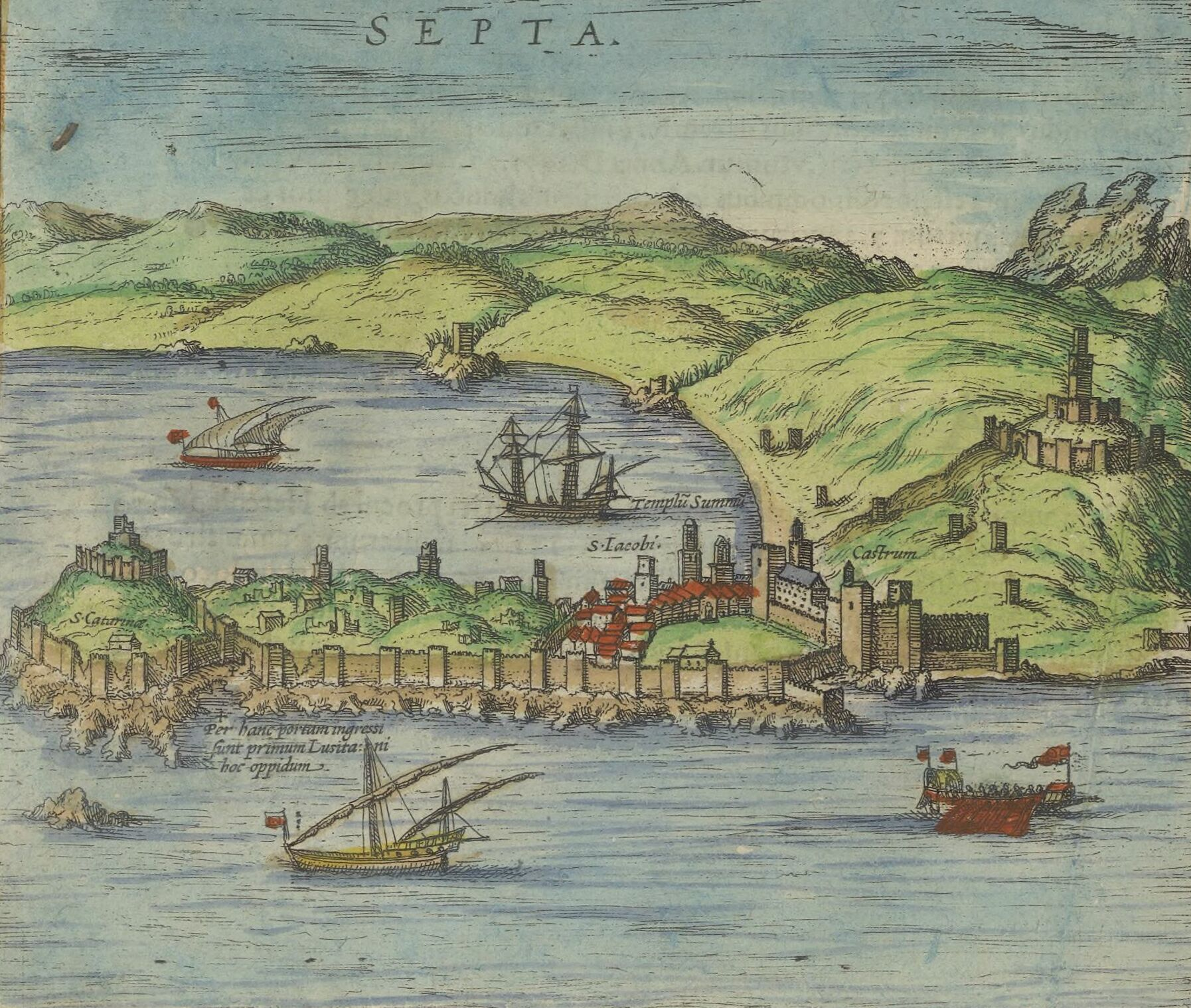
1572 depiction of Ceuta by Georg Braun, in Theatrum Orbis Terrarum.

After the Portuguese galleys were in the harbour of Ceuta, the Marinid governor of the city, Salah ben Salah evacuated many of the women and children to the surrounding lands and was reinforced by the tribal inhabitants of the region, voluntarily led by religious leaders. They were encouraged by the fact that only galleys turned up before the city. So many took up arms in the defense of Ceuta that the Portuguese would later claim no less than 100,000 had reinforced it. Ceuta received no aid whatsoever from the Sultan Abu Said Uthman III of Fez, either because the Marinid dynasty was too embroiled in internal disputes to be able to organize relief or because Salah ben Salah had been acting in an independent manner in recent years.

The first engagements between the Portuguese and the defenders of Ceuta then took place, with the Portuguese galleys being shot at from the walls, the vessel of the Admiral Carlos Pessanha being damaged the worst, as it was the closest to shore. Despite the separation of the fleet, Pessanha landed a detachment of men to skirmish with the Islamic ashore.

Having gathered the armada in the western anchorage of Ceuta on the 16th, King John determined to assault the city the following day. Yet the anchorage of Ceuta was found to be unsafe and so the king ordered that the fleet relocate to the anchorage on the eastern side but heavy winds then scattered the ships once more, forcing the king to seek refuge in the bay of Algeciras with the oarships, while the carracks were blown further east.

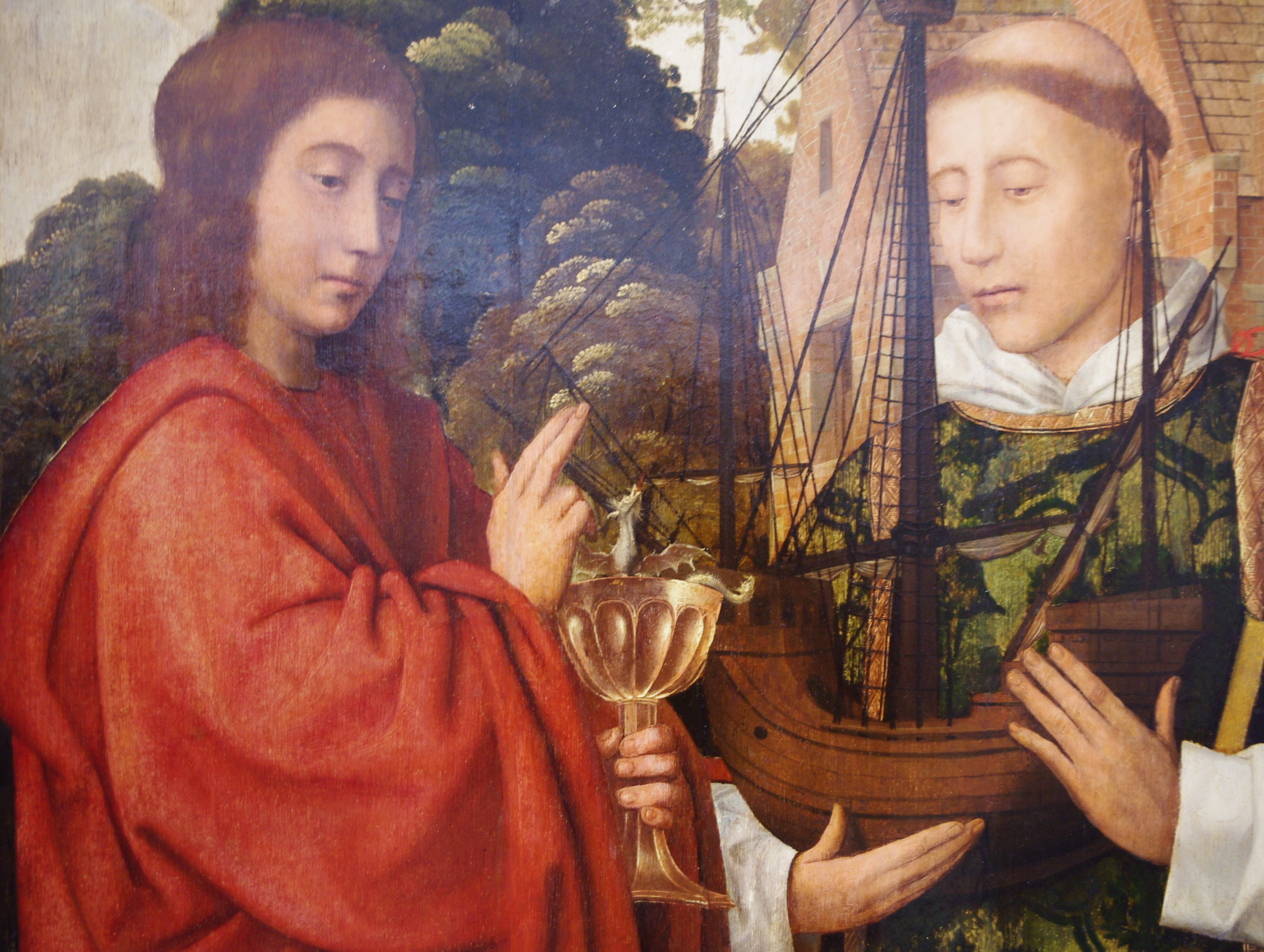
15th century Portuguese religious painting featuring a carrack.

Seeing the Portuguese fleet scatter and believing the attack would no longer take place, many of the undisciplined tribal warriors and militias that had gathered in the city for its defense withdrew to their lands, while governor Salah ben Salah made the fatal decision of dismissing the rest of the volunteers to prevent further conflict, leaving nothing but the usual garrison.

=== Interlude ===
From Algeciras, Prince Henry was instructed to bring back all the scattered carracks in tow of the galleys. Plague broke out among the fleet and ravaged the crews. King John then held a Council of war with his command while anchored off Punta Carnero, Spain, but he rejected the opinion of those who suggested calling off the attack. On the night of August 20 the Portuguese fleet set out again, and by nightfall it anchored in the harbour of Ceuta. The landing was scheduled for the following day.

Salah Ben Salah ordered that as many available men as possible be posted on the walls and as many lights and candles be lit that night to give the impression of readiness and of a large and well-garrisoned city, but although brilliant the effect proved null on the Portuguese. The Portuguese responded by lighting many lights on the fleet as well. An Arab writer commented that "in the same way as an expiring lamp throws out a more vivid flash when about to expire, so did Ceuta when about to succumb".

=== Assault of Ceuta ===
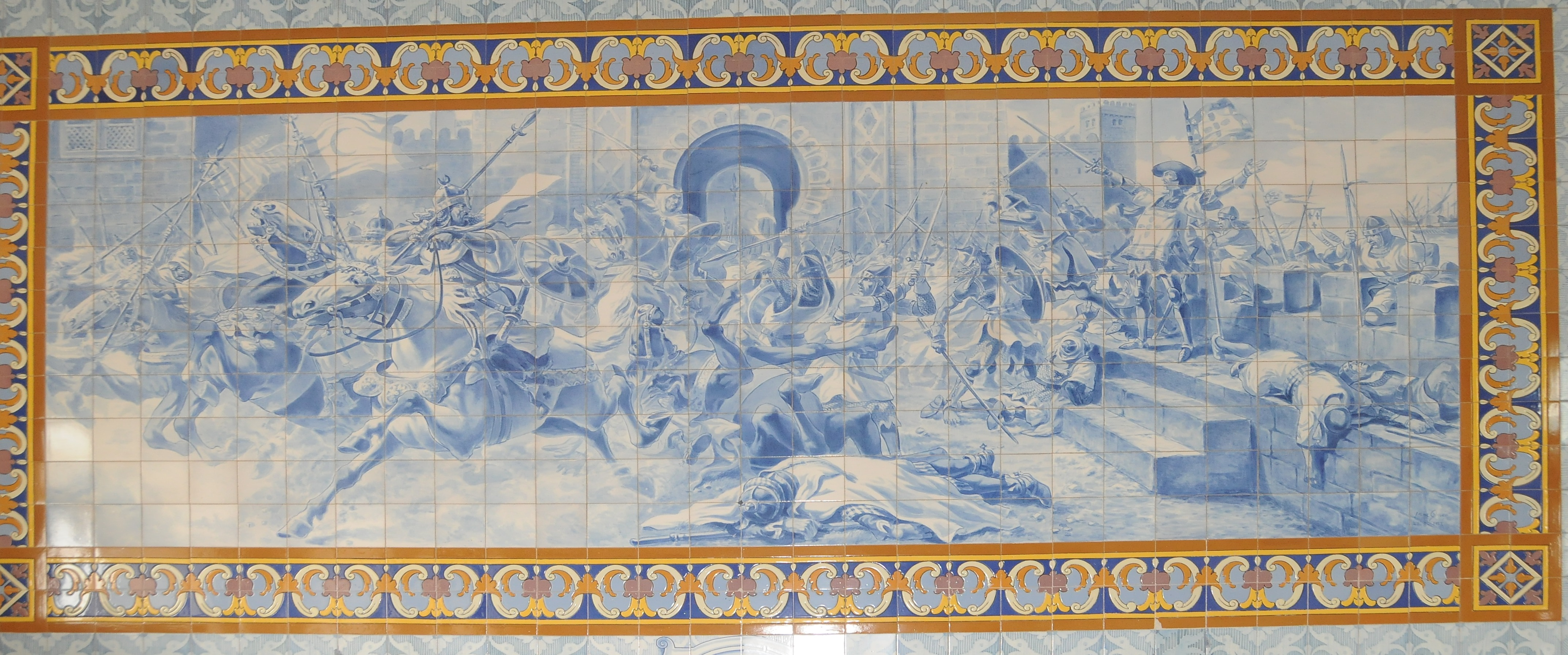
Commemorative Portuguese tile panel depicting Prince Henry the Navigator at Ceuta, by Jorge Colaço, in display at the Centro Cultural Rodrigues de Faria, Forjães, Esposende, Portugal.

On the morning of 21 August 1415, John I of Portugal ran through the fleet to issue the final instructions and was enthusiastically received. He gave out the orders for the landing of the troops and a general assault on the city. As the king boarded a longboat to be taken ashore however, he was wounded in the leg. Prince Henry was signalled to lead the troops ashore instead.

Many of Ceutas defenders gathered defiantly on the beach to prevent the Portuguese landing, though many of these were young an inexperienced. In spite of the kings orders, the first to land was Ruy Gonsalves, who encountered resistance upon landing at Playa San Amaro. Prince Henry was the first prince to land at the head of a squadron of men. He was followed by his brother, the prince-heir Edward, and at the head of about 300 men both succeeded in driving the Muslims defenders back to the Almedina gate, which was breached by the Portuguese before it could be securely shut.

The Marinids managed to put up some resistance within the cramped urban environment just beyond the gate, encouraged by a very large Nubian or Sudanese who stood his ground hurling large stones. After he was slain by Vasco Martins de Albergaria however, the Muslims turned and fled, chased deeper into the city by Prince Pedro, Prince Henry and the Constable at the head of the Portuguese troops.

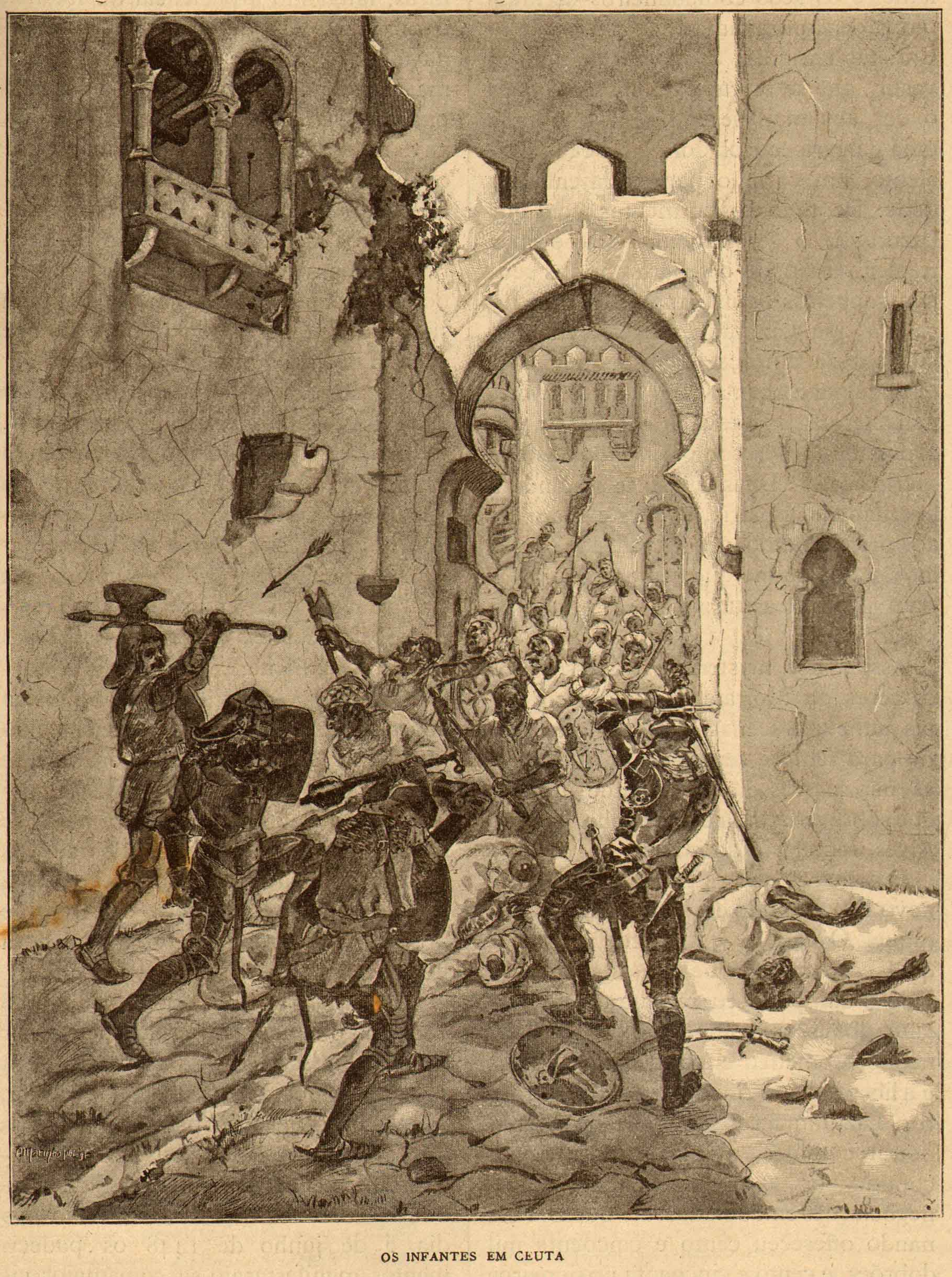
"The princes at Ceuta" by Roque Gameiro.

As the Portuguese poured into the city, Salah ben Salah descended from the high citadel to try and check the advance of the attackers in the narrow streets, so the residents could at least flee in time with their families and belongings. Disregarding the open gate through which Prince Henry had breached into the city, Vasco Fernandes de Ataíde attempted to open another gate at the head of a squadron of men, however they were repulsed and Ataíde mortally wounded.

Prince Henry left behind a detachment of men to secure the gate while they waited for rest of the army; it arrived shortly afterwards commanded by the King, prince Pedro and the Constable Nuno Álvares Pereira. King John would however take no further part in the fighting, and sat by the gate. During the urban fighting, princes Henry and Peter lost contact with the main Portuguese force and rumour spread that they had perished, as they could not be located. Upon being informed of the rumoured death of his son, king John supposedly replied that "such is the end which soldiers must expect". However towards the evening they were found, the lower city was secured and news spread that the Muslims were evacuating the citadel. Princes Henry, Peter and Edward gathered a council and decided to storm the citadel the following morning.

Meanwhile, Salah ben Salah held the citadel of Ceuta till sundown, but seeing no way to resist the Portuguese, he fled the city with a number of his men, taking their families and all they could carry.

After sunset scouts Portuguese reported that all its garrison had fled. Before dark, they marched up to its gates and began tearing them down with axes, but two Muslims shouted from atop the walls that no one else was left and they opened the doors. Álvaro Vaz de Almada, 1st Count of Avranches was first hoisted the flag of Lisbon (or of Saint Vicent) over the Ceuta castle per orders of the king. This symbol still stands today as the flag of Ceuta, but in which the coat of arms of the Kingdom of Portugal were added to the center. Ceuta was entirely in Portuguese hands and fighting ceased. Most of Ceutas residents fled the city, though a considerable number was killed in the action, and a few women, children and elderly unable to flee or take up arms could still be found in their houses.

Flag of Ceuta, based on the flag of Lisbon.

John's son Henry the Navigator distinguished himself in the battle, being wounded during the conquest.

== Aftermath ==
After the Muslim capitulation, the Portuguese were met by the Genoese merchant community of Ceuta, as the city had been the center of Genoese trade in the Maghreb for the past two centuries.

On the 21st of August the Portuguese consecrated the main mosque into the city's cathedral. King John offered the honours of the day to Henry and wished to knight him first, but on request of the prince his two brothers were knighted first in order of birth. It was the first Christian ceremony carried out in the newly consecrated temple. The Portuguese later found in its minaret two bells, which had previously been plundered by pirates from a Portuguese church in Lagos. Ceuta was constituted into a diocese, and the English Franciscan confessor of late Queen Philippa, friar Aymar d'Aurillac was appointed first bishop of Ceuta. That night was spent in careful watchfulness, and the morning of 22 of August was stormy with rain and hail.

The looting of the city was immense, though still less profitable than king John had expected. The plunder in gems, stuffs and drugs was great enough to make the common soldiers disregard other things like "great jars of oil and honey and spices and all provisions" which were thrown out into the streets and later swept away by a heavy rain. The Count of Barcelos Dom Afonso plundered more than 600 columns of marble and alabaster from the palace of Salah ben Salah and other buildings, along with an entire vaulted roof built with elaborate gilt work from a town square, for his residence in Portugal.

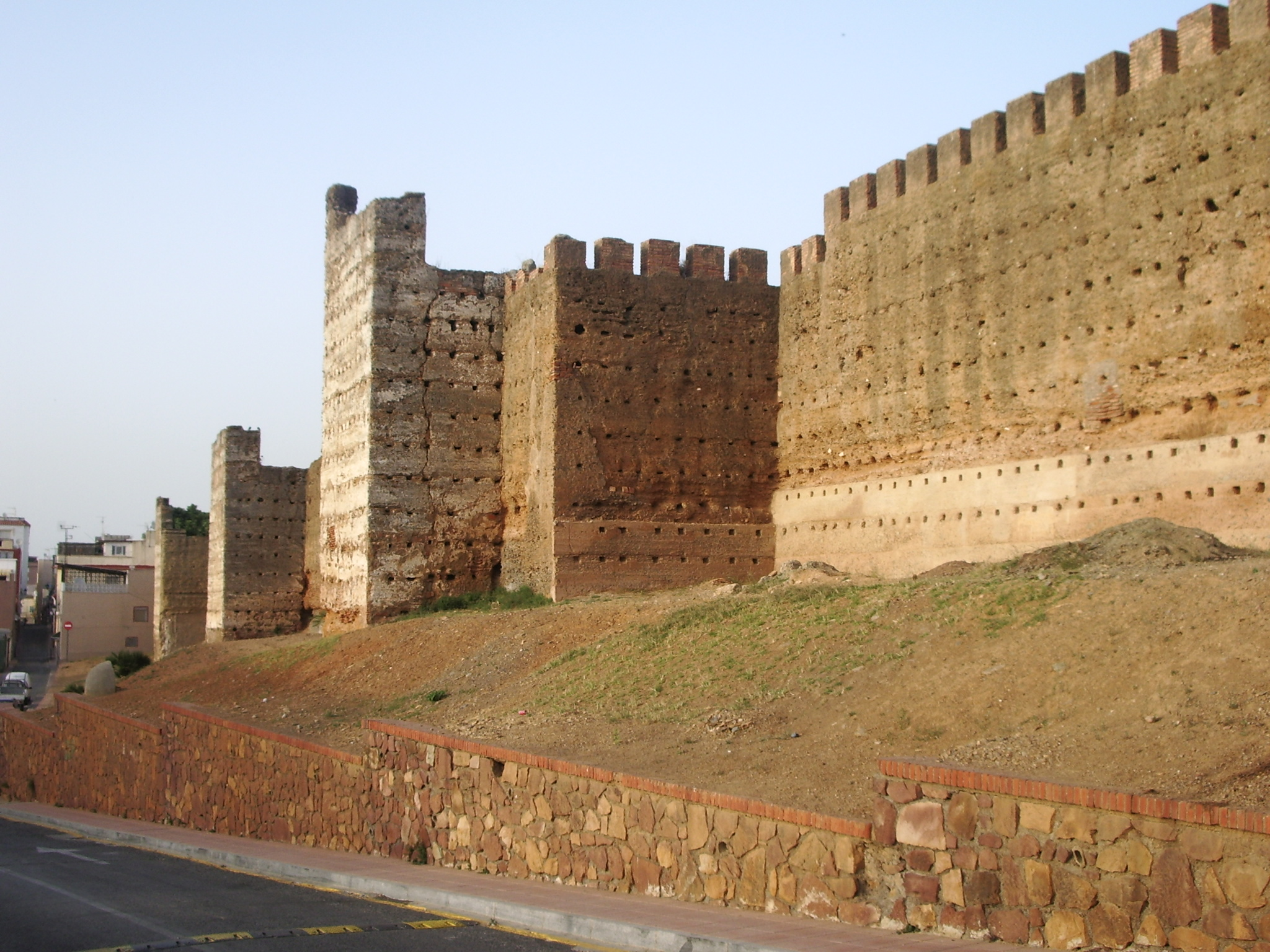
Remains of the Marinid walls of Ceuta.

King John dispatched envoys to various European Courts notifying them of the victory. He invited King Ferdinand of Aragon to join him in conquering north African lands, which Ferdinand appreciated, but died shortly after receiving the message.

Against the wishes of a considerable number of his men, he ultimately decided to keep the city, in order to pursue further enterprises in the area.

Appointing a governor proved unexpectedly difficult however, as many high-ranking nobles such as the Constable Nuno Álvares Pereira, the Marshal Gonçalo Vasques Coutinho and the head of the royal bodyguard Dom Martim Afonso de Melo all turned down the proposal of the king, but the Count of Viana Dom Pedro de Meneses willingly volunteered for the dangerous position. His father had sided with Castile against King John during the 1383–1385 Civil War, which may explain why Dom Pedro so eagerly sought the distinction.

The king left behind 2700 men as garrison. It included 300 squires of the royal household, 300 squires of the household of prince-heir Edward, 250 squires of the household of prince Peter, 300 squires of the household of prince Henry, 600 crossbowmen on foot and horse, an unrecorded number of squires from the cities of Évora and Beja plus a number of nobles with their followers. Many common foot-soldiers deeply resented the prospect of living in an isolated frontier city, surrounded by hostile Muslim powers eager to obtain revenge on Christians, and fearing certain death or captivity, begged to be taken back, bribed officials to sneak them back aboard the ships or feigned illnesses. Some willingly settled in the city as militia, such as craftsmen. Others eagerly embraced the life of frontiersmen. Likely many were nobles and their vassals, seeking wealth and glory in service overseas, such as Rui de Sousa, who stayed behind with 40 retainers. Such nobles could have become a serious factor of internal destabilization and conflict after peace had been signed with Castile in 1411.

=== Later history ===
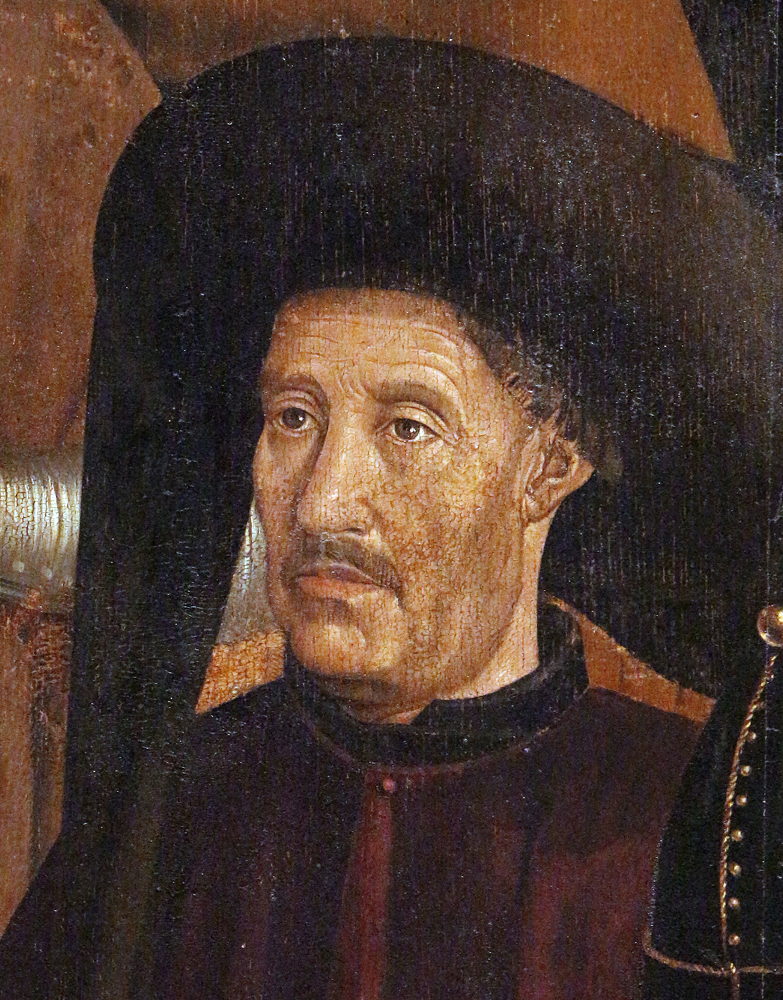
Prince Henry, depicted in the Saint Vincent Panels c. 1450.

King John left with the majority of the force in September 2, 1415. As soon as the Portuguese fleet returned home with most of the army, the residents of Ceuta who had sought refuge in the surrounding hills and orchards attempted to recover the city numerous times, however they were easily fought back by the garrison in almost daily skirmishes. Dom Pedro had the houses, towers, orchards and groves around the city pulled down and ditches filled up so as to clear the line of sight around the city, and prevent ambushes.

After the conquest of Ceuta, the Casa de Ceuta was established in Portugal, being a royal institution with clerks, treasurers, warehouse officials and factors and numerous offices in Lisbon, Porto, Santarém and elsewhere, in charge of overseeing the supply of the city.

In 1419, the Marinid Sultan Abu Said Uthman III laid siege to Ceuta with the help of the Nasrid Emir of Granada Muhammad VIII in an attempt to recover it, however the Portuguese successfully repulsed the attack under the able command of Dom Pedro de Meneses. Blamed for losing Ceuta, the sultan was later assassinated when a coup took place in Fez in 1420, leaving only a child as his heir. The Marinid sultanate descended into anarchic chaos as rival pretenders vied for the throne and local governors carved out regional fiefs for themselves, selling their support to the highest bidder. The political crisis released the pressure on Ceuta for the next few years.

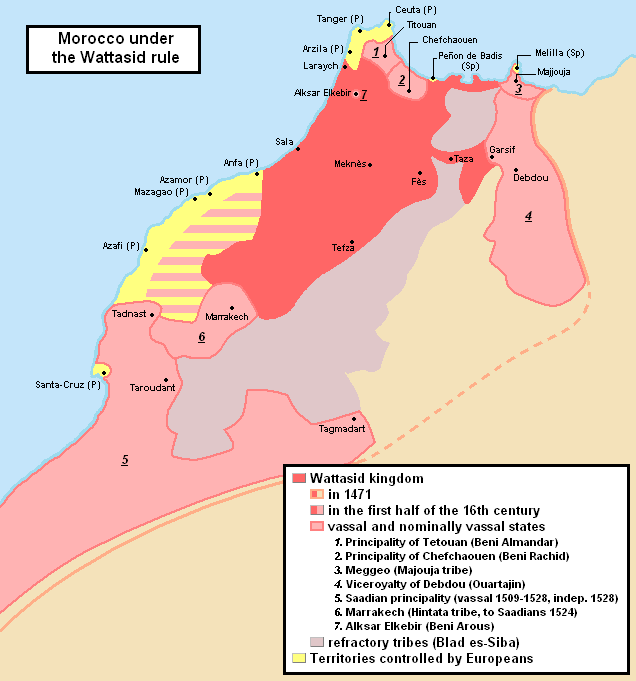
Portuguese possessions in Magreb (1415–1769)

In time, Ceuta became a formidable military base, and one of the main havens for Christian privateering in the western Mediterranean, and the main base from which Portuguese ships raided hostile Muslim shipping from Salé to Granada and Tunis, an activity which yielded the captain of Ceuta Dom Pedro de Meneses and King John I valuable profits. On the other hand, Christian navigation in the Strait of Gibraltar became safer. Portuguese raids caused the Marinids shores to be abandoned by a considerable number of inhabitants, who fled inland, while foreign trade gradually faltered. Ceuta was sought by soldiers of fortune of various nationalities, such as Castilians, Aragonese, Flemings, Germans and even Poles looking to gain wealth and glory.

Prince Henry distinguished himself at Ceuta as a daring commander. Later, Henry V of England, Pope Martin V, Emperor Sigismund and King John II of Castile all offered Prince Henry the command of their armies upon hearing of his reputation; however, Henry turned down these offers.

Under King John's son, Duarte, the stronghold of Ceuta rapidly became a drain on the Portuguese treasury. Trans-Sahara caravans journeyed instead to Tangier. It was soon realised that without the city of Tangier, possession of Ceuta was worthless.

After Edward succeeded king John on the throne of Portugal, in 1437 Henry and Ferdinand persuaded him to launch a new attack on the Marinid sultanate. The resulting attack on Tangier, led by Henry, was a debacle. In the resulting treaty, Henry handed his brother Ferdinand to the Marinids as a hostage and promised to deliver Ceuta back to the Marinids in return for allowing the Portuguese army to depart unmolested.

Possession of Ceuta would indirectly lead to further Portuguese expansion. The main area of Portuguese expansion, at this time, was the coast of Morocco, where there was grain, cattle, sugar, and textiles, as well as fish, hides, wax, and honey.

Ceuta had to endure alone for 43 years, until the position of the city was consolidated with the taking of Ksar es-Seghir (1458), Arzila and Tangier (1471). The city was recognized as a Portuguese possession by the Treaty of Alcáçovas (1479) and by the Treaty of Tordesilhas (1494).

Ceuta was transferred to Spain under the Treaty of Lisbon in 1668 after the Restoration War.

== See also ==
- European enclaves in North Africa before 1830
- Tripas à moda do Porto
- Battle of Tangier (1437)
- Portuguese conquest of Ksar es-Seghir
- Anfa expedition (1468)
- Conquest of Asilah
- Portuguese Asilah
- Portuguese Tangier
- Illustrious Generation
- Aviz Dynasty
- Portuguese Discoveries

== Bibliography ==
- Barata, Filipe Themudo (2016). "Ceuta: Da Organização De Uma Máquina de Guerra À Eficácia de Um Instrumento de Política Externa". XVII Jornadas de Historia de Ceuta: Portugal y el Norte de Africa, Historias d'Aquem e d'Além-Mar. Ceuta: Instituto de Estudius Ceutíes.
- Barata, Filipe Themudo (2015). "O CORSO E A PIRATARIA A PARTIR DE CEUTA: INSTRUMENTO POLÍTICO E NEGÓCIO POPULAR". Actas Xiv Simpósio de História Marítima: Ceuta e a Expansão Portuguesa.
- Campos, Nuno Silva (2018). D. Pedro de Meneses e a construção da Casa de Vila Real (1415–1437). Publicações do Cidehus.
- Campos, Nuno Silva (2015). GUERRA E CORSO EM CEUTA DURANTE A CAPITANIA DE D. PEDRO DE MENESES (1415–1437). ACTAS XIV SIMPÓSIO DE HISTÓRIA MARÍTIMA: CEUTA E A EXPANSÃO PORTUGUESA.
- Chase, Kenneth Warren (2003). Firearms: a global history to 1700. Cambridge University Press. ISBN 978-0-521-82274-9.
- Duarte, Luís Miguel (2016). "Ceuta: Tudo Aquilo Que Sempre Quisemos Saber e Nunca Ousámos Perguntar". XVII Jornadas de Historia de Ceuta: Portugal y el Norte de Africa, Historias d'Aquem e d'Além-Mar. Ceuta: Instituto de Estudius Ceutíes: 75–88.
- Gallagher, Aileen (2003). Prince Henry the Navigator: Pioneer of Modern Exploration. Rosen Publishing. ISBN 978-0-8239-3621-2.
- Hills, George (1974). Rock of Contention: A history of Gibraltar. London: Robert Hale & Company.
- Kinard, Jeff (2007). Artillery: an illustrated history of its impact. Bloomsbury Academic. ISBN 978-1-85109-556-8.
- Julien, Charles-André (1961). Histoire de l'Afrique du Nord, des origines à 1830 (in French) (Second ed.). Paris: Payot.
- Koch, Peter O. (2003). To the ends of the earth: the age of the European explorers. McFarland. ISBN 978-0-7864-1565-6.
- Latham, John Derek (1973). "The later 'Azafids". Revue de l'Occident musulman et de la Méditerranée. 15 (1): 109–125. ISSN 2105-2271.
- López de Coca Castañer, José Enrique (1998). "Granada y la expansión portuguesa en el Magreb extremo". Historia. Instituciones. Documentos (25). Seville: Universidad de Sevilla: 351–368. doi:10.12795/hid.1998.i25.018. ISSN 0210-7716. S2CID 252936676.
- Major, Richard Henry (1868). The Life of Prince Henry of Portugal Surnamed the Navigator, and Its Results, Comprising the Discovery, Within One Century, of Half the World ... from Authentic Contemporary Documents. Asher. pp. 26–42.
- Manzano Rodríguez, Miguel Ángel (1992). La intervención de los Benimerines en la Península Ibérica. Madrid: Consejo Superior de Investigaciones Científicas. ISBN 84-00-07220-0.
- Newitt, Malyn (2004). A History of Portuguese Overseas Expansion 1400–1668. Routledge. ISBN 978-1134553044.
- Oliveira Martins, Joaquim Pedro (1891). Os Filhos de D. João I. Imprensa Nacional.
- Payne, Stanley G. (1973). "The Expansion". A History of Spain and Portugal. Vol. I. University of Wisconsin Press. ISBN 978-0-299-06270-5.
- Prestage, Edgar (1966). The Portuguese pioneers. London: Adam & Charles Black.
- Quintella, Ignacio da Costa (1839). Annaes da Marinha Portugueza. Typographia da Academia Real das Sciencias. pp. 57–70.
- Russell, Peter E. (2000). Prince Henry "the Navigator": a life. New Haven: Yale University Press.
- da Silva, Manuel Flávio Duarte (2019). O abastecimento de Ceuta nos meados do século XV (segundo a carta de quitação a Gonçalo Pacheco). University of Porto. pp. 36–37.
