= Aguz =

Aguz may refer to:

- The old name of the present Moroccan town of Souira Guedima
- Qasr el-'Aguz, the modern name of the ancient Egyptian site, not far from Thebes, of a temple of the Pharaonic god Thoth
- Another village Al-Aguz lies between Bawiti and Mandishahnear in the Bahariya Oasis
