= Castelo Real =

Castelo Real of Mogador
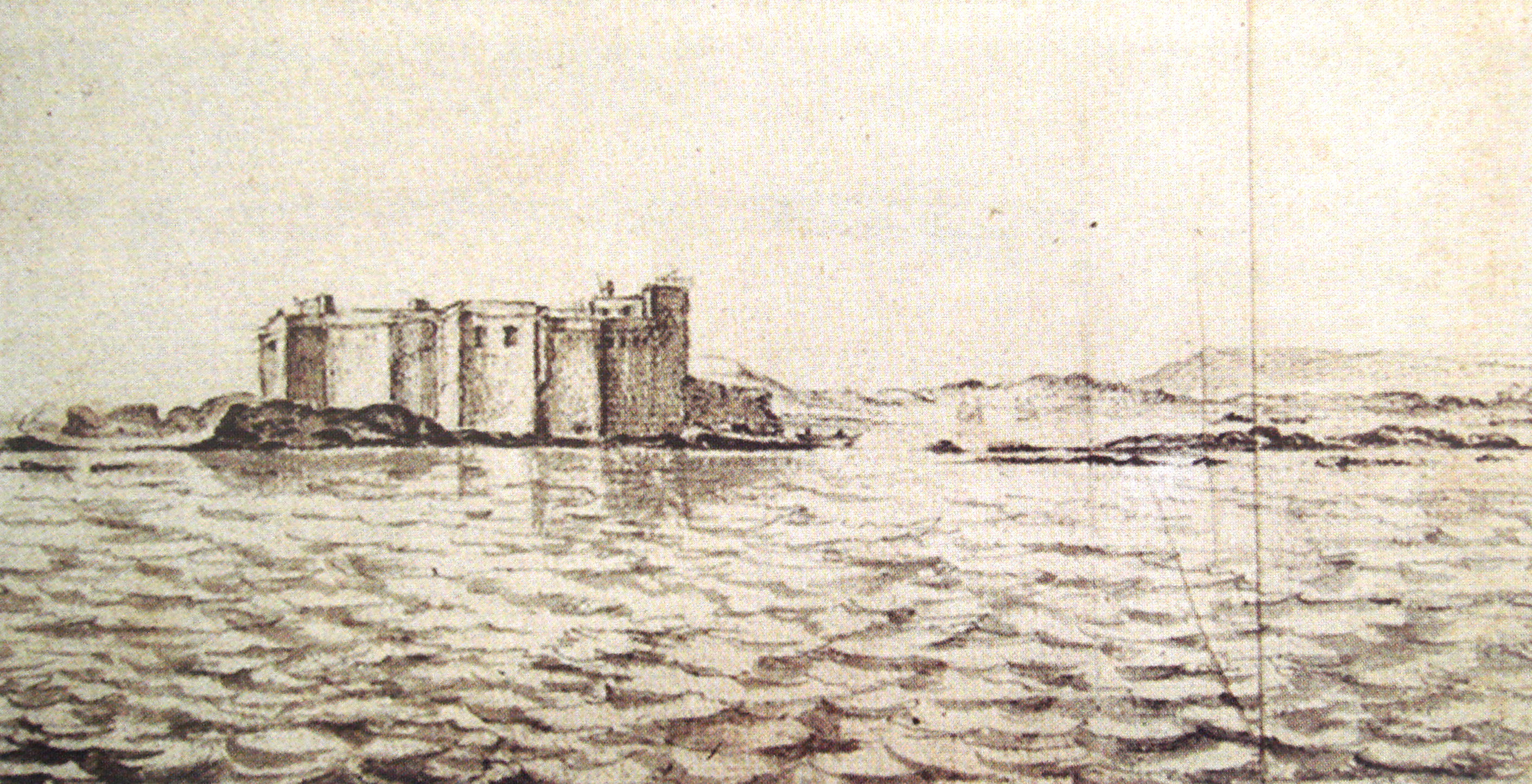
- Castelo Real of Mogador, by Adriaen Matham, 1641.

- Location in Morocco
- Coordinates: 31°30′34″N 9°46′30″W
- Country: Morocco
- Region: Marrakesh-Safi
- Province: Essaouira

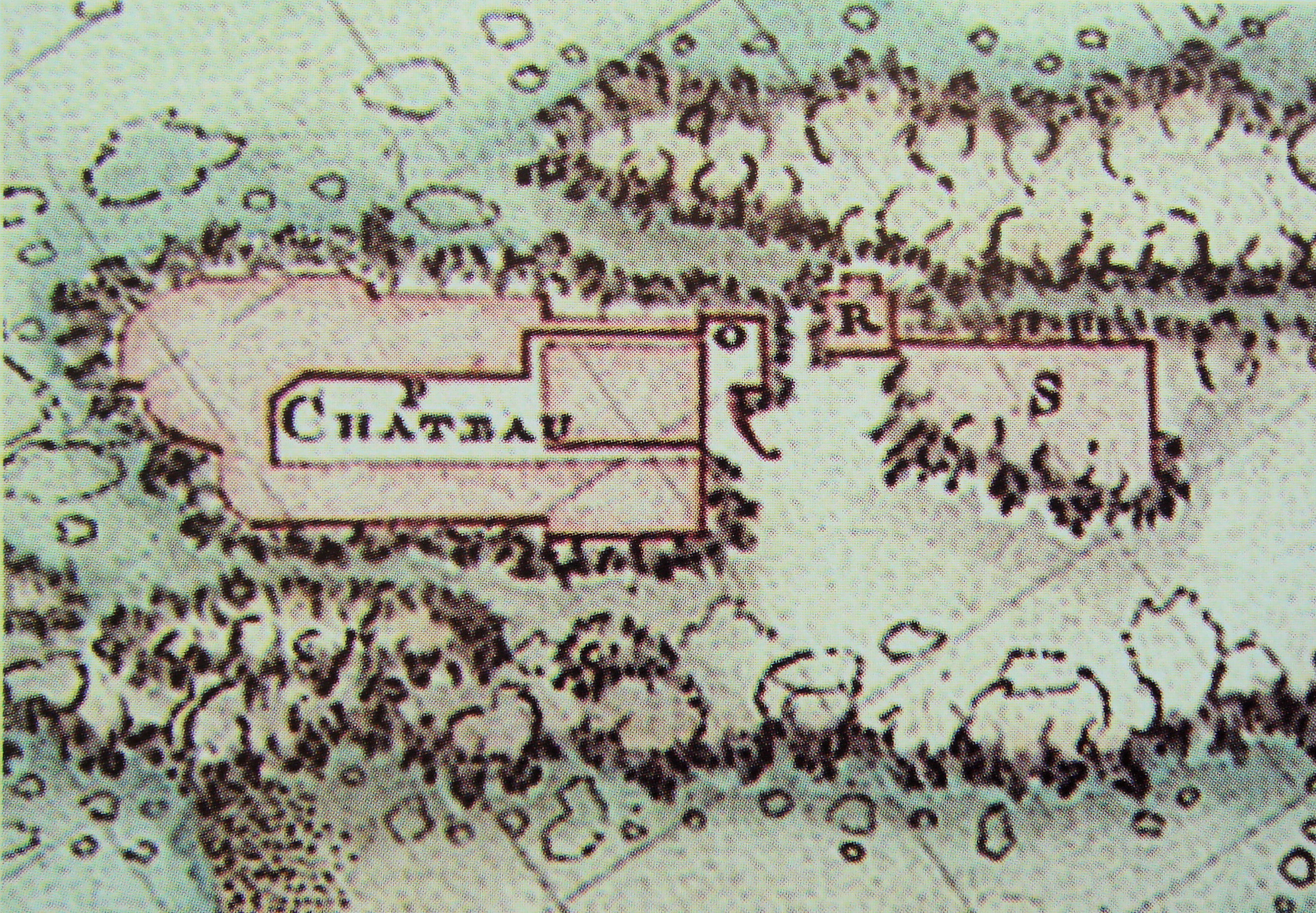
Castelo Real of Mogador, by Théodore Cornut 1767.

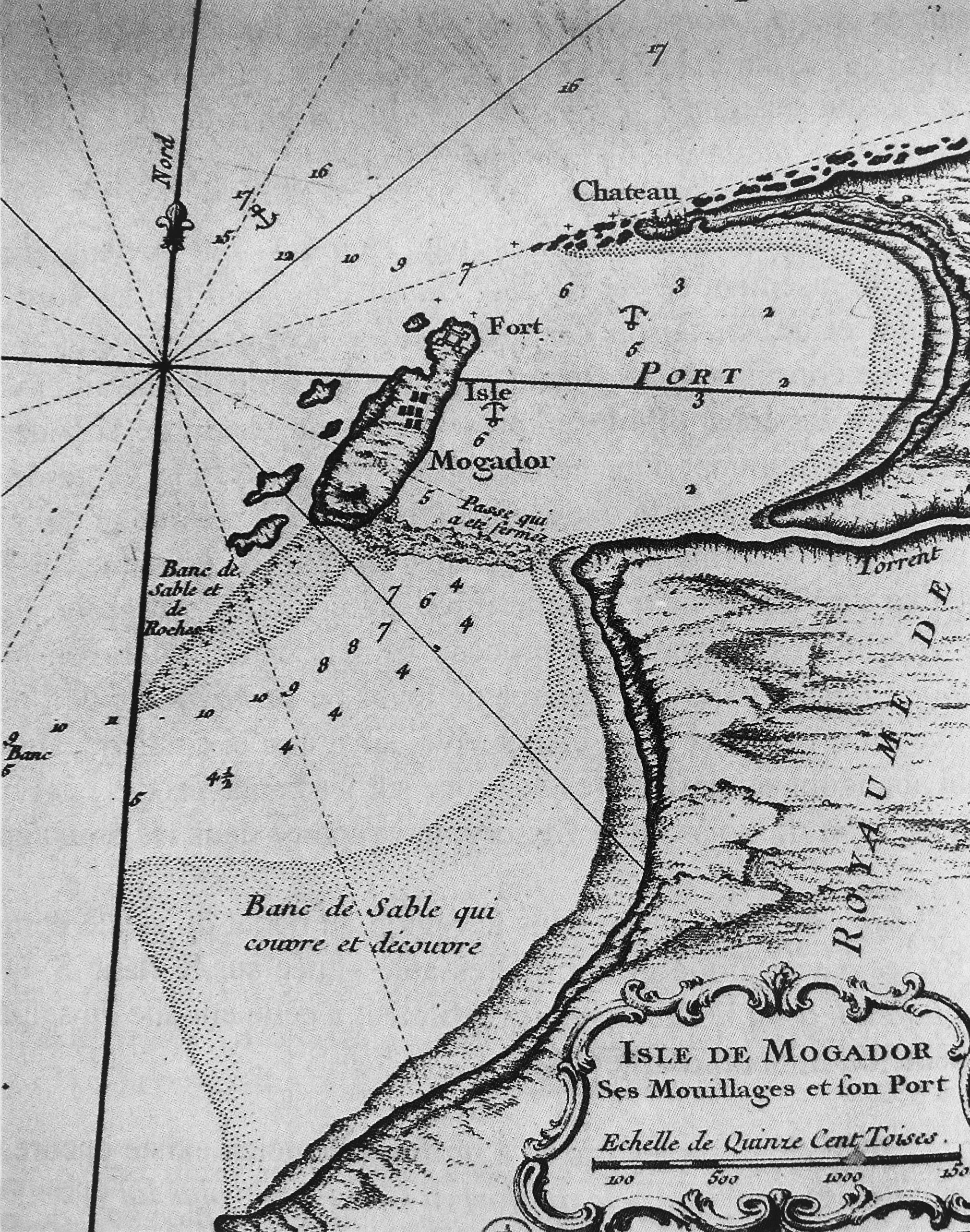
Location of the Castelo Real ("Chateau") at the northern edge of the bay of Mogador, where the harbour of Essaouira is located today.

Castelo Real is a Portuguese castle established in Mogador, now Essaouira in Morocco, by the Portuguese in 1506.

The Castello disappeared by the late 18th century, and today stands in its place a circular bastion known as Borj el-Barmil.

== Construction (1506) ==
The Portuguese king Dom Manuel ordered Diogo de Azambuja, the founder of Castello da Mina, to build a castle on a small island, now called "La Petite Ile", in the Moroccan locality of Mogador. The role of the castle was to serve as a relay on their routes along the Moroccan coast, between Safi, where the Portuguese were established since the end of the 15th century, and Agadir, which had just been occupied in 1504. The castle could also easily receive supplies from Madeira.

The construction process was accompanied by constant attacks from the Beni Regraga tribe, strongly motivated by Jihad and supported by the Saadians. On several occasions, the garrison was helped by troops sent from Portugal, one of which was a detachment of 350 men sent from Madeira. The Beni Regraga, a sub-tribe of the Masmuda, were the dominant force in the region together with two other sub-tribes originating from the Jebel Hadid, the Iron Mountain, the Haha, and the Chiadma. The tribes blockaded the fortress and in October or November of 1510, they successfully managed to capture the castle under unknown circumstances.

The castle appears in various subsequent documents, as late as 1767 with the map of Théodore Cornut. Soon however the fortifications of Essaouira were updated to become what they are today, and all traces of the Castelo Real have disappeared. Its stones were reused in the construction of the Sqala du Port, and in its place stands a circular bastion known as Borj el-Barmil.

== Other Portuguese fortresses in Morocco ==
Altogether, the Portuguese are documented to have seized 6 Moroccan towns, and built 6 stand-alone fortresses on the Moroccan Atlantic coast, between the river Loukos in the north and the river of Sous in the south. Four of them only had a short duration: Graciosa (1489), São João da Mamora (1515), Castelo Real of Mogador (1506–10) and Aguz (1520–25). Two of them were to become permanent urban settlements: Santa Cruz do Cabo de Gué (Agadir, founded in 1505-06), and Mazagan founded in 1514-17. The Portuguese had to abandon most of their settlements between 1541 and 1550, although they were able to keep Ceuta, Tangier and Mazagan.

== See also ==
- Morocco-Portugal relations
