= Siege of Graciosa (1489) =

Moroccan siege of Portuguese fortress

- Part of Moroccan–Portuguese conflicts
Date	July – 27 August 1489
Location	Graciosa
Result	Moroccan victory

Belligerents
Kingdom of Portugal	Wattasid dynasty

Commanders and leaders
Gaspar Jusarte; Diego Fernandes de Almeida	Muhammad al-Wattasi

Strength
1,500 men	4,000 cavalry Large number of infantry

Casualties and losses
Heavy	Heavy

The siege of Graciosa was a military campaign launched in 1489 by the Wattassid sultan Mohammed al-Wattasi in order to take the Portuguese stronghold of Graciosa. The Portuguese forces eventually capitulated, then evacuated the place.

== Background ==
In 1481, King Afonso died and was succeeded by his son, John. John decided to continue his predesscor policy of expansion in Morocco. John began working on strengthening the Portuguese position by establishing a fortress in the interior, which could be easily supplied and reinforced by sea. In February 1489, an expedition was launched led by Gaspar Jusarte with the mission of establishing a fort next to the Loukkos River which received its name as Gracisoa. Diego Fernandes de Almeida was given the governance of the fort.

The vessels went to the river with no difficulty, and workers were disembarked to build. The site, however, proved to be disadvantageous despite being protected by cannons from the fort and Caravels. The river was sluggish and was surrounded by marshy swamps, serpentine coils, and oxbow lakes. Aware of the Portuguese activity, the Moroccan sultan, Muhammad al-Wattasi, rushed to the fort in an attempt to dislodge them from there.

== Siege ==
As summer approached, the Moroccan tribes came from the hills and began surrounding the Portuguese fort, harassing the enemy. In July, Muhammad arrived to participate in the siege with a force of 4,000 cavalry and a large amount of infantry. The garrison had a total of 1,500 men. The Portuguese artillery and Caravals fired at the Moroccans day and night, which kept the Moroccans at bay. In response, the sultan had brought cannons with him to engage with the enemy. By mid-August, casualties were mounting up on both sides, and the river mud was stained with blood from both sides.

Seeing that the siege was prolonged, the sultan, on the advice of a renegade, had all the oak trees cut and embedded on the Loukkos river, which blocked the river two leagues downstream. Now the Moroccans had no need to fight. The trapped Portuguese ships were incapable of escaping, and the Portuguese were forced to capitulate. Both sides signed a peace treaty on August 27. A ten-year truce was signed, and the Portuguese were allowed to evacuate with all their baggage.

== Aftermath ==
After the siege, John made no attempt to expand Portuguese influence in Morocco and was stopped for the moment. Although disappointed, John kept searching for any Christian allies in Africa who could help him outflank the Muslim kingdoms. The Portuguese withdrawal prompted the Moroccans to establish the town of Larache on the mouth of the river.

== Sources ==
- Barnaby Rogerson (2010), The Last Crusaders: The Hundred-Year Battle for the Center of the World.
- Academy of Inscriptions and Belles-Lettres (France). Reports of the sessions of the year, Academy of Inscriptions and Belles-Lettres, Paris, Imprimerie nationale.
- Ahmad Busharb (2014), Documents and studies of the Portuguese invasion of Morocco and its results.
- H. V. Livermore (1947), A History of Portugal.
