= Diogo de Azambuja =

Portuguese explorer and explorer (1432–1518)

Captain-major of Portuguese Gold Coast
- In office 1482–1485
- Monarch: John II of Portugal
- Preceded by: Office created
- Succeeded by: Álvaro Vaz Pestano

Personal details
- Born: 1432 Montemor-o-Velho, Kingdom of Portugal
- Died: 1518 (aged 85–86) Montemor-o-Velho, Kingdom of Portugal
- Spouse: Leonor Botelho
- Children: António de Azambuja; Cecília de Azambuja; Catarina de Azambuja

Military service
- Allegiance: Portuguese Empire
- Battles/wars: Battle of Alfarrobeira; Moroccan-Portuguese conflicts War of the Castilian Succession

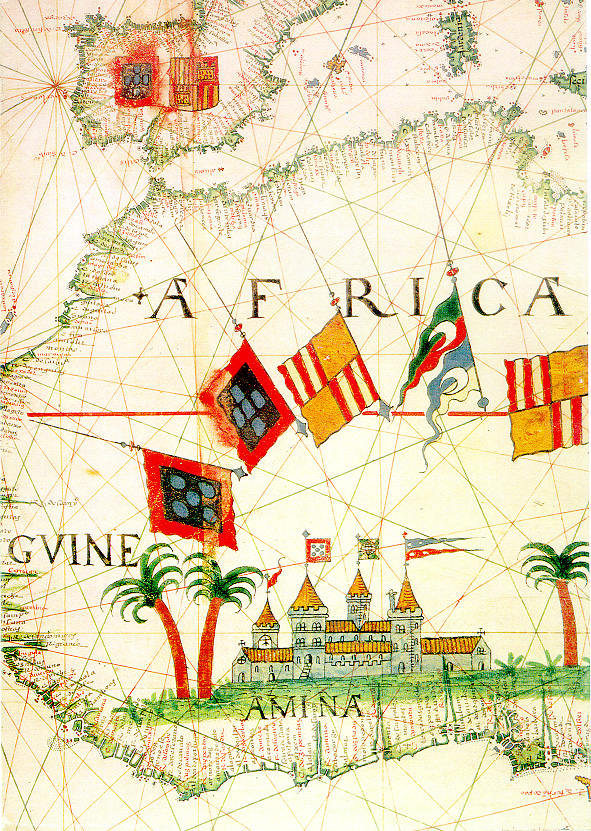
Detail of the Portuguese possession of São Jorge da Mina (A Mina), in a 16th-century Portuguese map

Diogo de Azambuja or Diego de Azambuja (1432–1518) was a Portuguese noble and explorer.

== Soldier ==
He was born at Montemor-o-Velho, and became a knight of the Order of Aviz in the service of the Infante Dom Pedro, son of the Regent Infante Peter, Duke of Coimbra. After Peter's defeat and death in the battle of Alfarrobeira (1449), he accompanied his master into exile. In 1458, he fought on the side of Afonso V in the conquest of Alcácer-Ceguer in Morocco. He received several honours and became a counselor of the king. During the War of the Castilian Succession, he participated in the recapture of the town of Alegrete from the Castilians. He was injured in the leg during this engagement.

== Portuguese Gold Coast ==
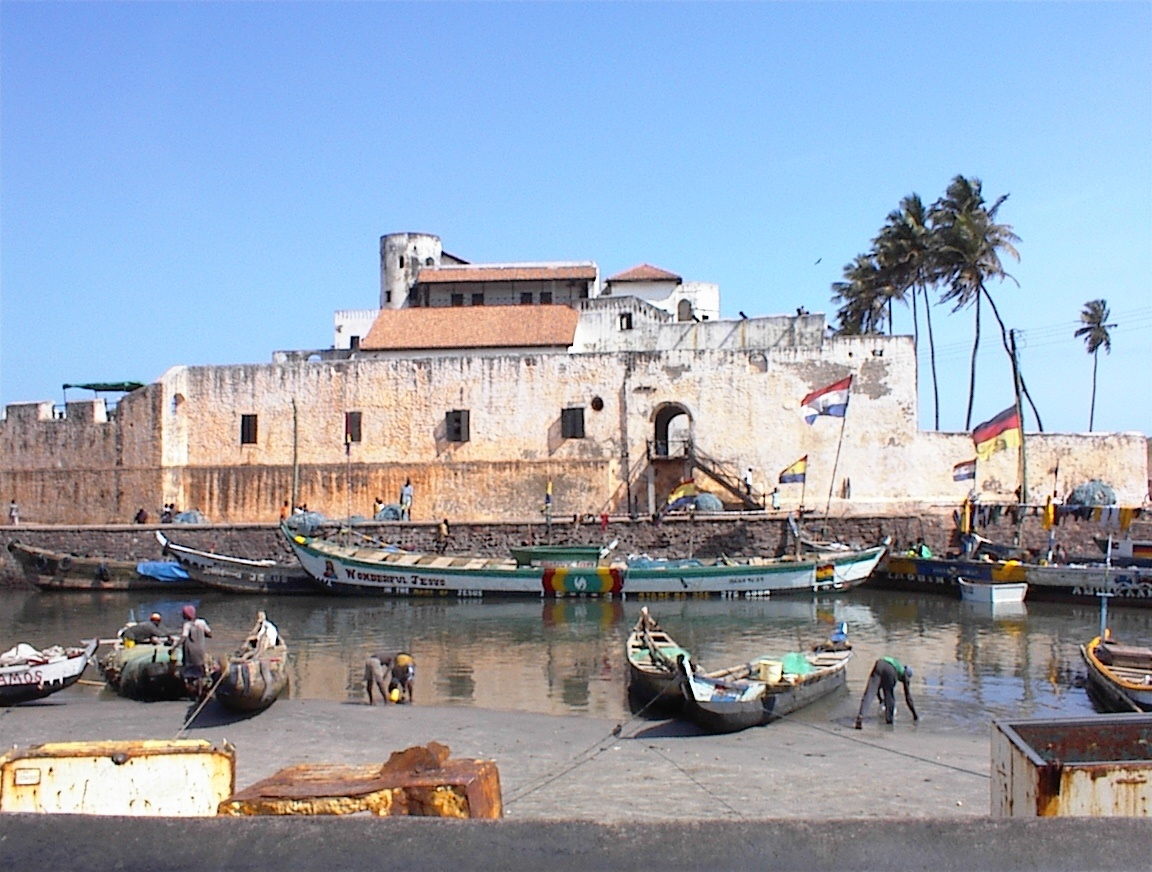
São Jorge da Mina (Elmina Castle)

In 1481, Diogo was appointed by John II as captain of a fleet consisting of nine caravels and two ships with 600 soldiers and 100 masons and carpenters. They were sent, along with the necessary stone and other materials, to construct a fortress called São Jorge da Mina at the Gulf of Guinea in the Portuguese Gold Coast colony. This became the best-known exploit of his long life. They chose a favourable defensive position for the fort, and construction was practically complete after only 20 days, in spite of resistance from the native population.

With the fortress finished, contacts were established with the local population to establish trade. Diogo de Azambuja sent the fleet back to Lisbon with word that the mission has been successfully accomplished, and he remained behind as captain of the fortress with a force of 60 soldiers. He held this post until 1484. The fortress is now known as "Elmina Castle", or the "Elmina Slave Castle".

== Courtier ==
Diogo was rewarded by the king with the post of alcaide-mor of Monsaraz, and was also named to the Privy Council. Diogo de Azambuja remained attached to the Court and the kings service for many years, in spite of his advancing age and disabled leg. He was already over the age of 70 in 1506 when Manuel I placed him in charge of building a fortress called Castelo Real at Essaouira, near Safi, in the south of Morocco, to protect Portuguese interests in the area. Diogo of Azambuja not only carried out the mission, he also took the city of Safi, where he remained as captain until 1509, at the age of 77 years. At that time he finally returned to Portugal, where he died in 1518.
