= Siege of Mazagan (1769) =

1769 siege

Coordinates: 33°14′N 8°30′W

- Part of the Moroccan–Portuguese conflicts
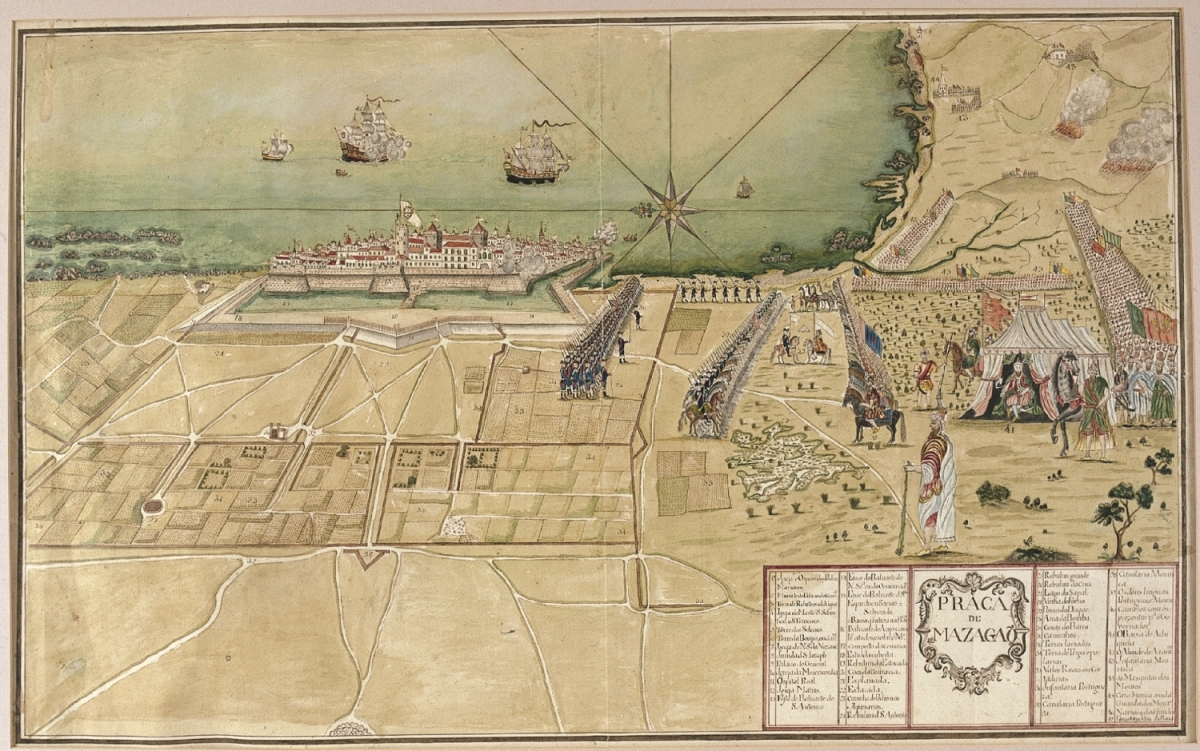
- The siege and the evacuation of Mazagan in 1769
Date	Early 1769 – 11 March 1769
Location	El Jadida, Morocco
Result	Moroccan victory

Belligerents
Kingdom of Portugal	Sultanate of Morocco

Commanders and leaders
(Portugal) Dinis Gregório (Portugal) Bernardo Esquível	(Morocco) Mohammed III

Strength
592 men	70,000 men 35 cannons

Casualties and losses
Unknown	5,000 dead

The siege of Mazagan of 1769 was the last engagement between Morocco and the Portuguese in Mazagan (El Jadida). The Moroccan army under Sultan Mohammed ben Abdallah was victorious and the Portuguese evacuated their last garrison in Morocco, bringing an end to their 354-year-long conflict.

== Background ==
The Portuguese existence in Mazagan began in 1514 when they built a citadel in summer. In 1562, the Moroccans led by the Saadi Sultan Abu Abdallah Mohammed al-Mutawakkil unsuccessfully attempted to oust the Portuguese from Mazagan. The Portuguese garrison in Mazagan in 1769 was of 592 men: 472 infantrymen, 99 cavalrymen and 21 artillerymen.

== Siege ==
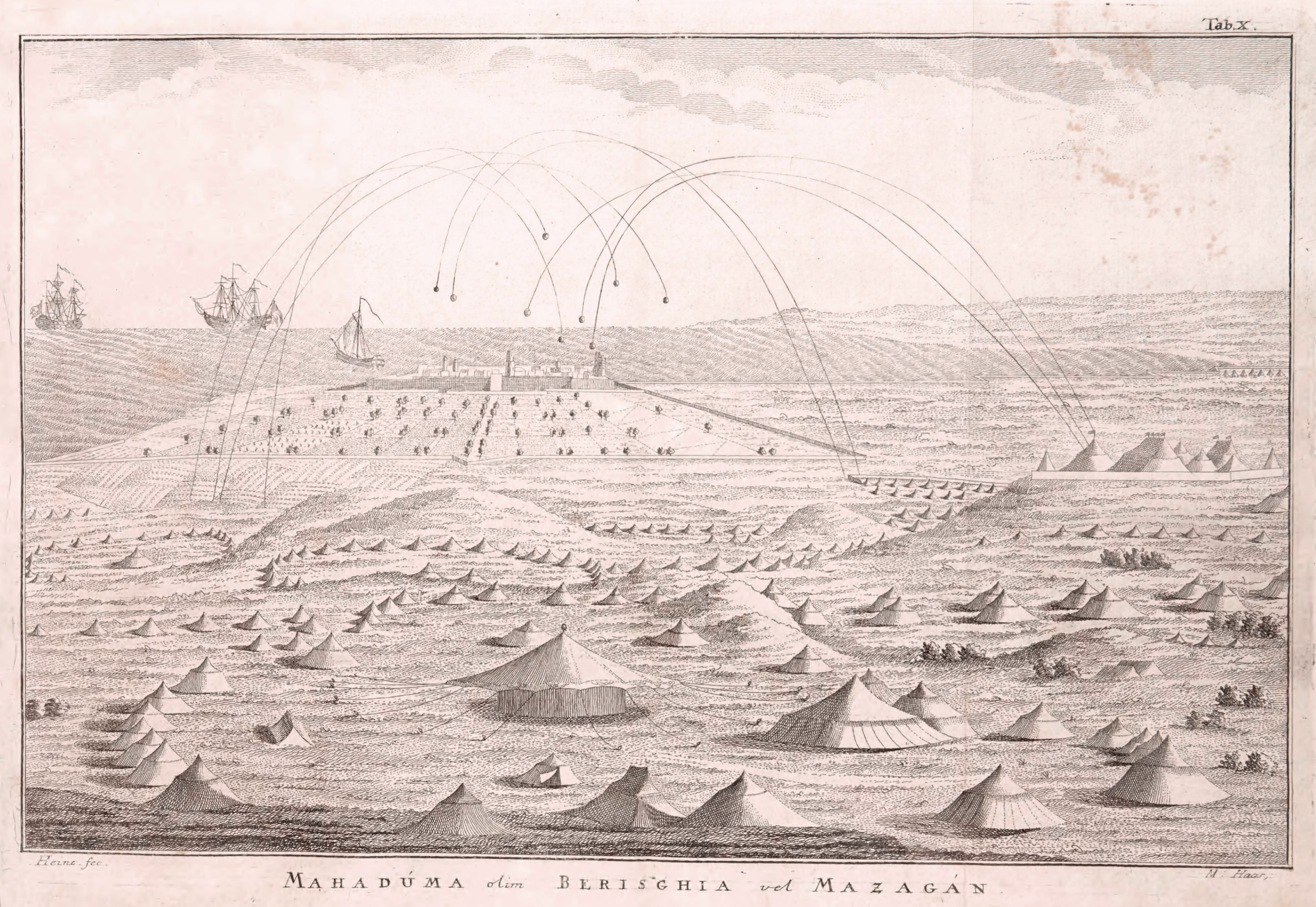
Engraving by Peter Haas depicting the siege of Mazagan, included at the book Efterretninger om Marokos og Fes by Georg Hjersing Høst, 1779

In early 1769, the 'Alawite Sultan Mohammed ben Abdallah, refusing to acknowledge the Portuguese rule in Mazagan, prepared a large army of 70,000 men, arriving at Mazagan during the month of Ramadan, he had 35 cannons prepared and bombard it with 2,000 round shots into the city inflicting heavy casualties on the Portuguese and Damaging the city, as the siege prolonged, the garrison sent a letter to King Joseph I of Portugal asking for aid, Joseph instructed them to evacuate the fort taking everyone alongside their families when the inhabitants knew this they refused to abandon their last colony arguing their ancestors sacrificed themselves to keep it. Later the inhabitants complied to the order and sent to Sultan Mohammed asking to stop the fighting and give them 3 days to evacuate the town, Mohammed accepted on condition that they would leave everything behind.

In 1 February, a squadron, under the command of captain of sea and war Bernardo Ramires Esquível, sailed from Lisbon to evacuate the population of Mazagan. The squadron was composed of the 54-gun ship of the line Nossa Senhora de Belém e São José commanded by Esquível, this was the flagship of the expedition; the frigates Nossa Senhora da Nazaré and Nossa Senhora da Guia; the charruas Nossa Senhora das Mercês and Santa Ana e São Joaquim, as well as five yachts.

During the three days, the Portuguese burned the Furniture and the beddings, killed the livestock, and broke utensils and tools. The Portuguese did not respect the agreement, they buried gunpowder and mined the bastions, with around 40 barrels of gunpowder in each bastion. The boarding of the population was completed on 11 March and the last evacuated was the governor of Mazagan, Dinis Gregório. They left a man called "Pedro"; it is said that he ignited the gunpowder when the Moroccans entered, killing 5,000 Moroccans in the explosion. Due to this, the city remained uninhabited for nearly half a century and was called El-Mahdouma (The Ruined).

== Aftermath ==
The squadron arrived at Lisbon between 21 and 24 March, the evacuees were attended at the expense of the royal family with dinner and supper, but were housed in miserable conditions. More than three hundred died in hospitals. The survivors later went to the colony of Brazil, where they founded a new settlement in 1773 called Vila Nova de Mazagão in the interior of the Amapá region of the State of Grão-Pará and Rio Negro.

Sultan Moulay Abd al-Rahman ordered that a mosque be built, and the destroyed portions of the former Portuguese city were rebuilt during his reign in the early nineteenth-century. In 1820, the name Mazagan was now banned, and the city was called El-Jadida (The New).
