= Sqala of the Port =

Coordinates: 31.5102°N 9.7742°W

Sqala du Port
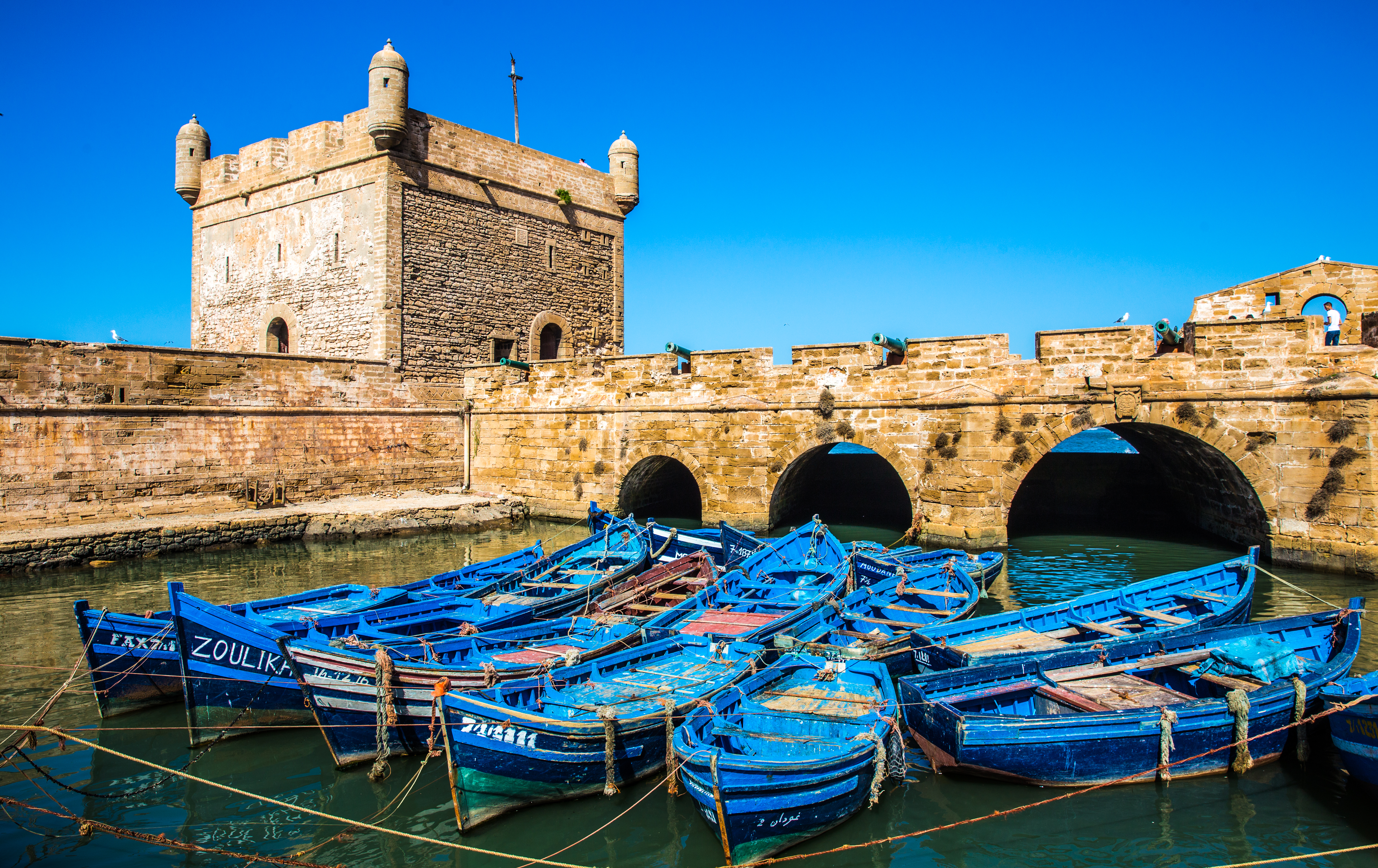
- The Sqala du Port overlooked by Borj el-Barmil (Circular Bastion).
- Interactive map of Sqala du Port
- Location: Essaouira, Marrakesh-Safi, Morocco

History
- Built: 1769

Site notes
- Architectural style: Manueline

The Sqala du Port or Sqala Al Marsa (Arabic: سقالة المرسى) is an artillery platform dating from the 18th century located in Essaouira, Morocco. It is one of the principal fortifications of the city of Essaouira and is situated within the Port of Essaouira.

== History ==
The Sqala of the Port was built in 1769 under the orders of Sultan Mohammed ben Abdallah of the Alaouite dynasty. The Castelo Real formerly occupied the site but was demolished to make way for the construction of the Port of Essaouira and its fortifications. Stones from the former Castelo Real were reused in the construction of the Sqala du Port.

The fortification took part in the defense of the city during the Bombardment of Mogador carried out by the French during the Franco-Moroccan War.

It has been listed as a historic monument since the dahir of 30 August 1924.

== Architecture ==

Built in the Manueline style, the Sqala of the Port consists of two fortified wings, each approximately 200 metres (660 ft) long, intersecting at right angles. They are connected to Bab el-Marsa and dominated by Borj el-Barmil. Its principal function is the defense of the harbor.

== Armament ==
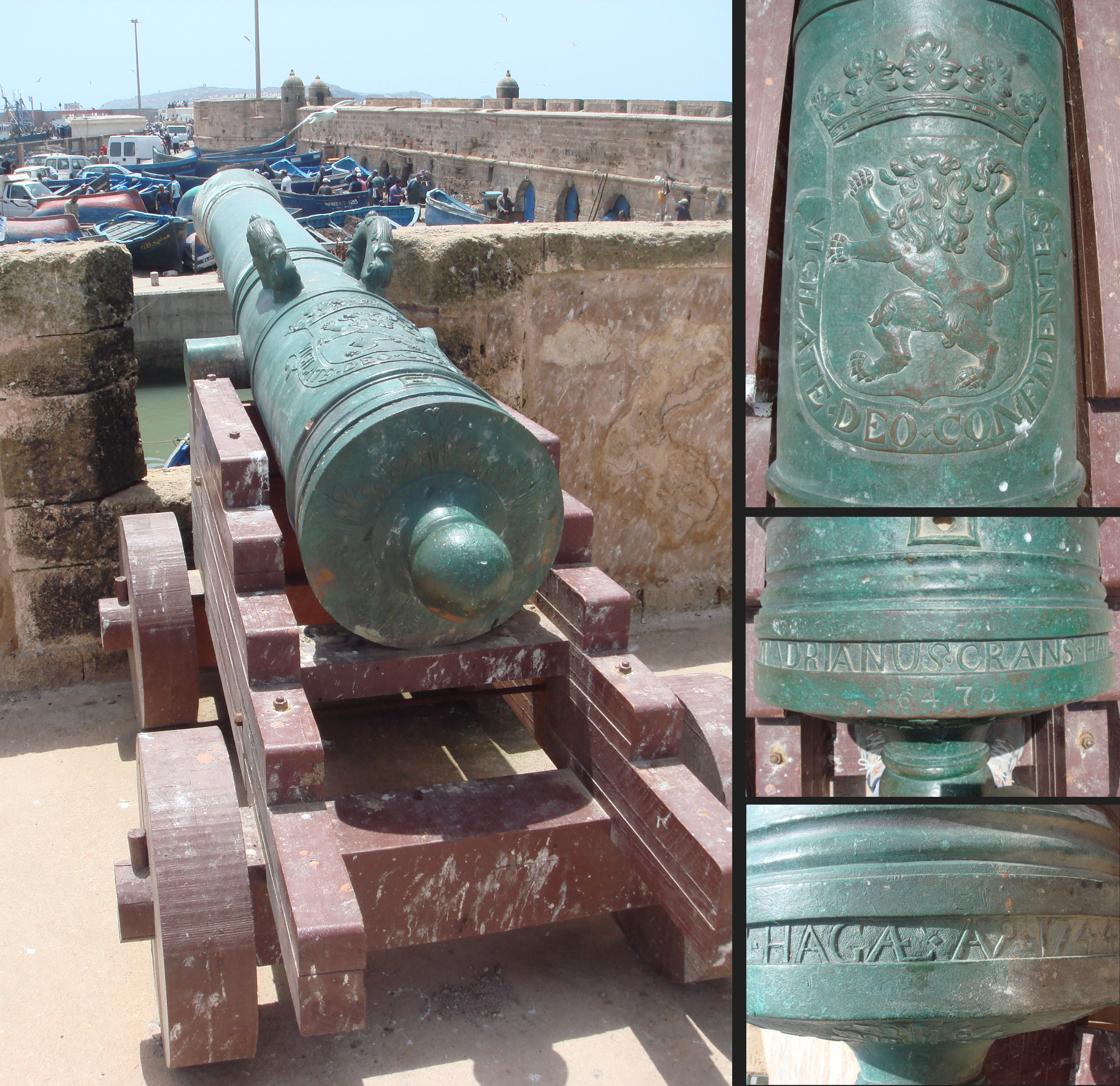
Dutch cannon dating from 1744, defending the Port of Essaouira from the Sqala du Port.

Equipped with a collection of artillery pieces, the Sqala du Port is primarily armed with bronze cannons manufactured in Spain, although some were also produced in the Netherlands. These cannons measure 3.25 metres (10.7 ft) in length and have a caliber of 150 millimetres (5.9 in) with an external breech diameter of 450 millimetres (18 in). They were designed to fire 10-pound (4.5 kg) cannonballs to a range of approximately 1,500 metres (4,900 ft).

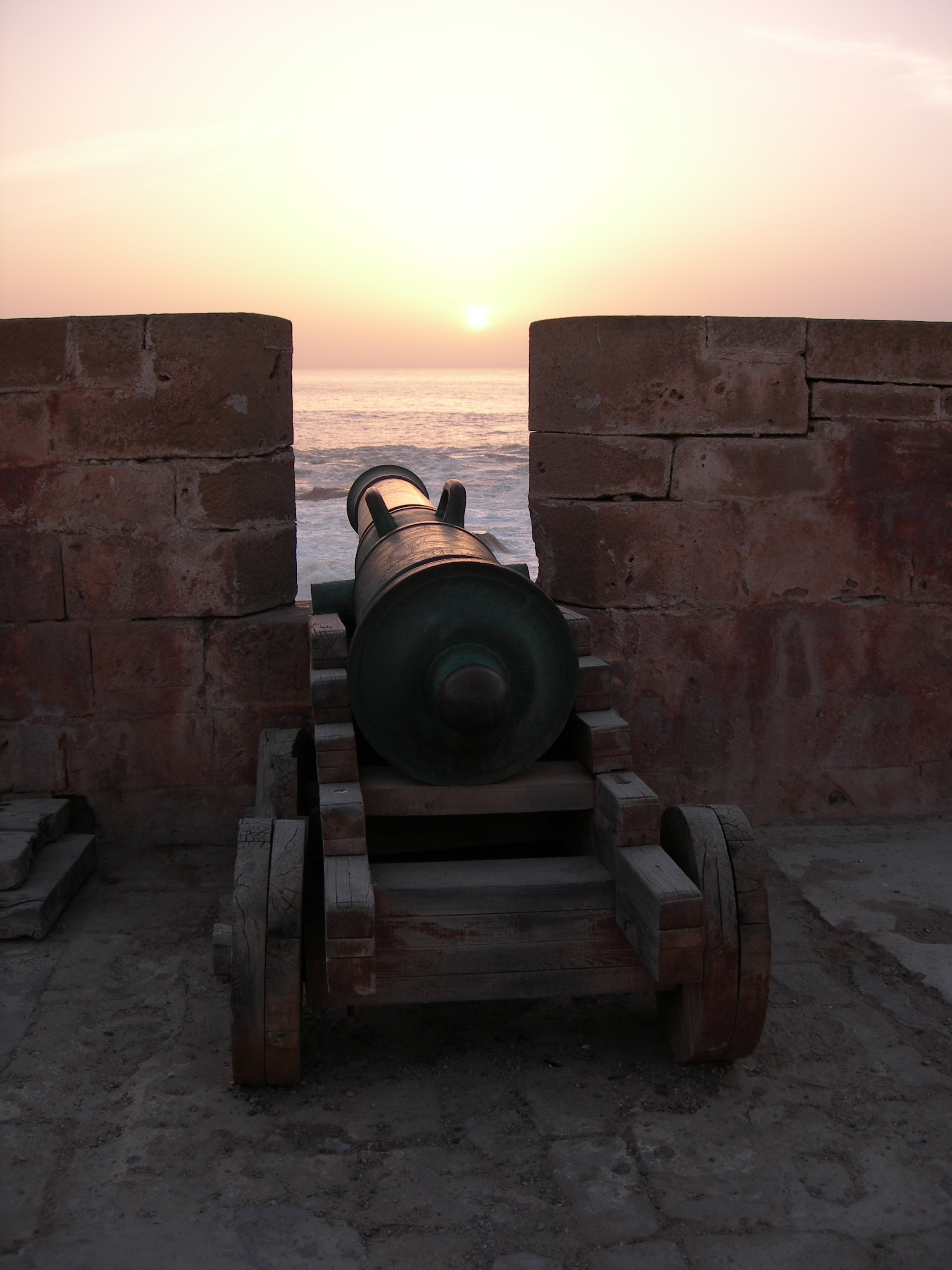
Sunset with one of the cannons.

== See also ==
- List of forts in Morocco
- Essaouira
