= Théodore Cornut =

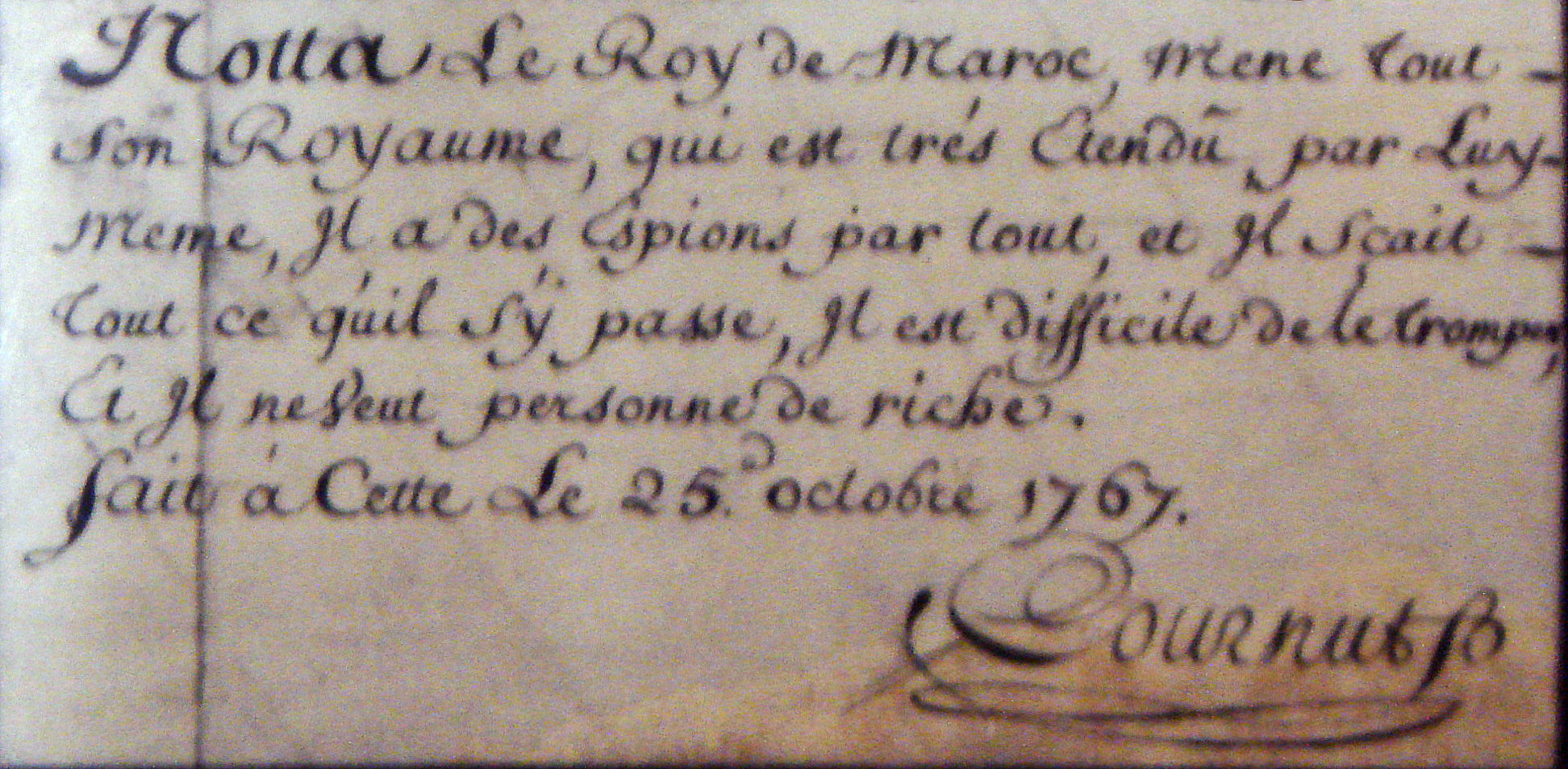
- Théodore Cornut handwriting and signature on his map of Essaouira, 25 October 1767.
- Known for: Architect of Essaouira, Morocco.

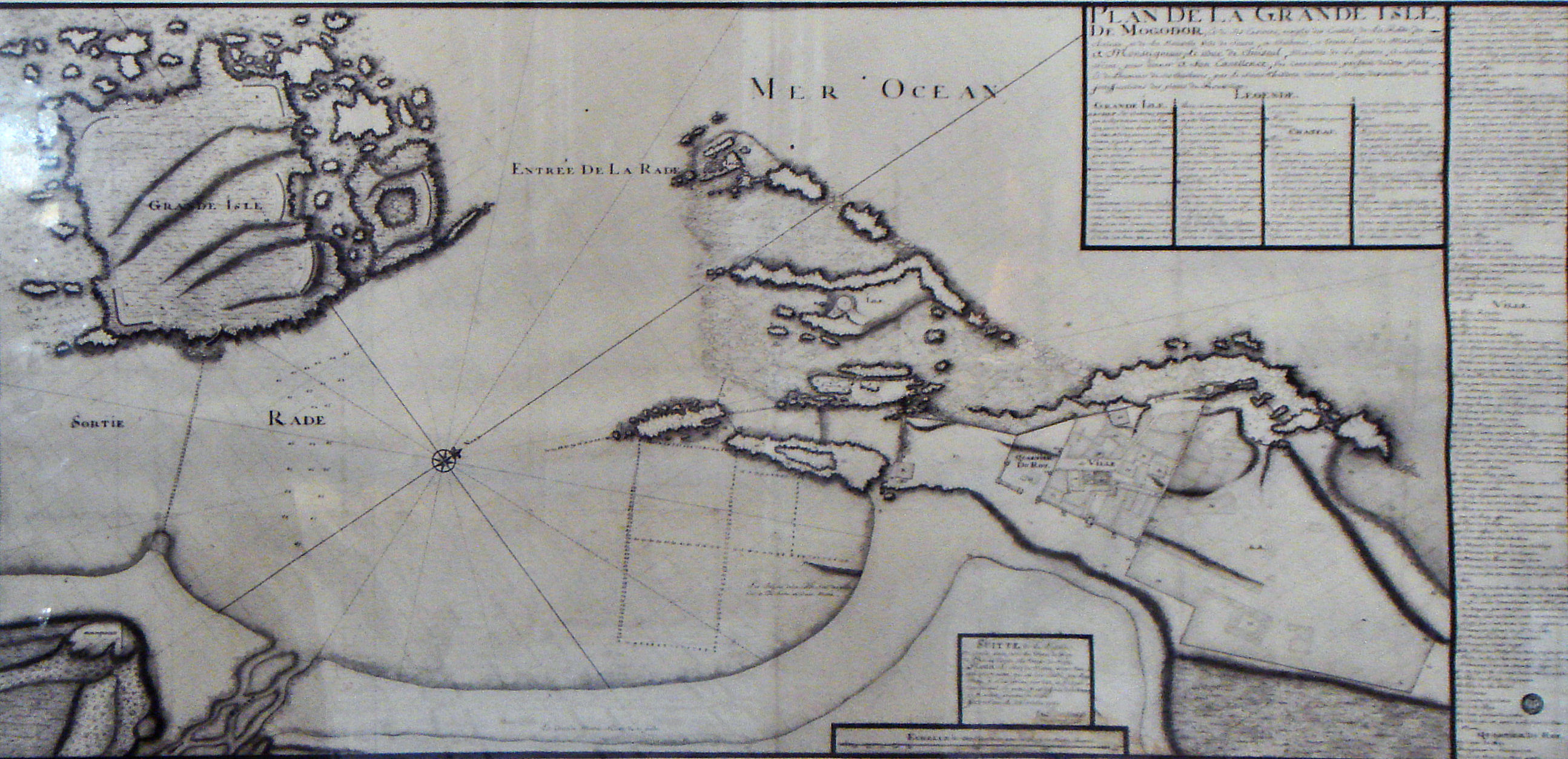
Map of Essaouira bay, by Théodore Cornut, 1767.

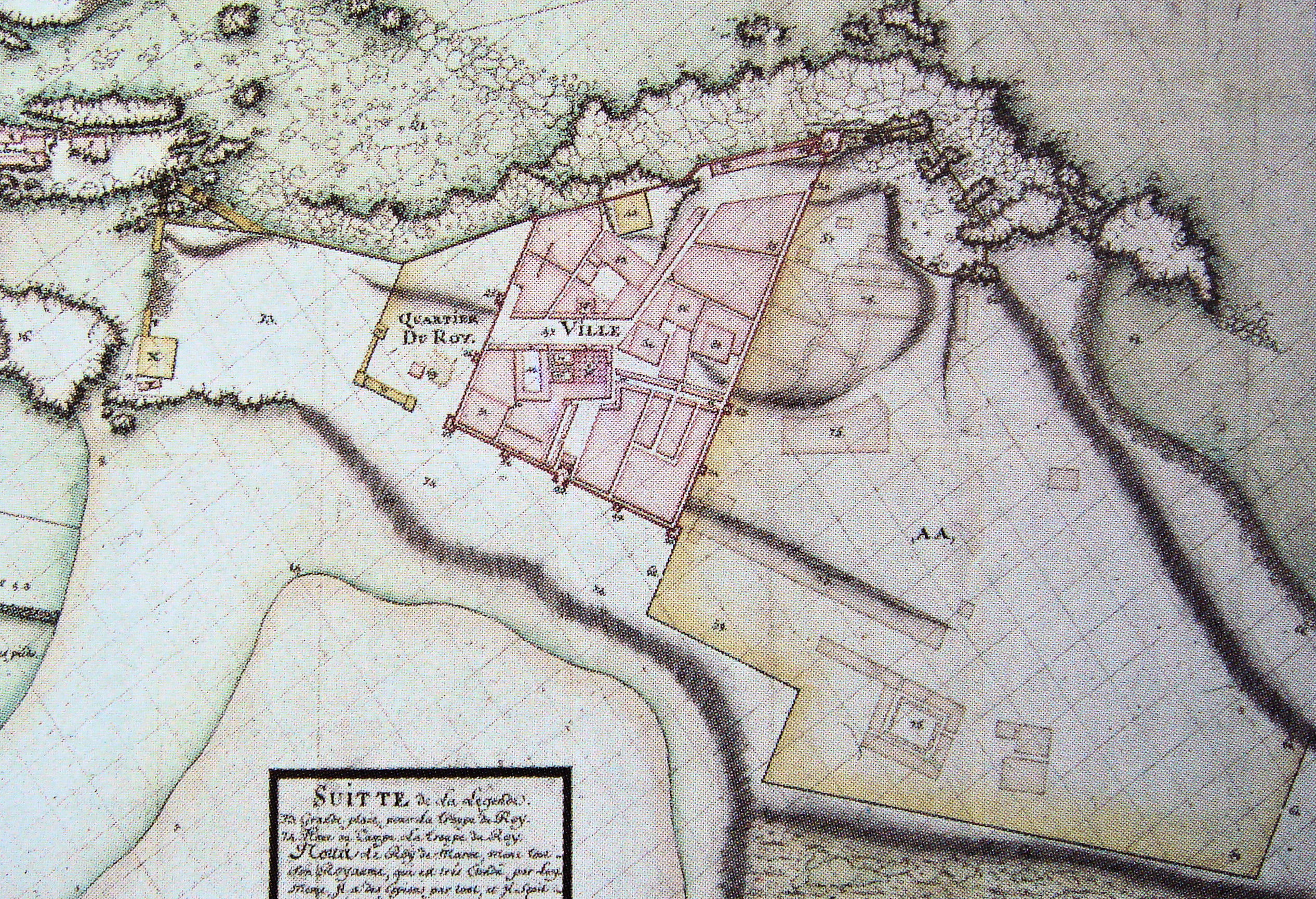
Map of Essaouira by Théodore Cornut. When he left Morocco in 1767, areas in pink were already built (streets are still recognizable), whether areas in yellow (harbour front, and medina) were only projected.

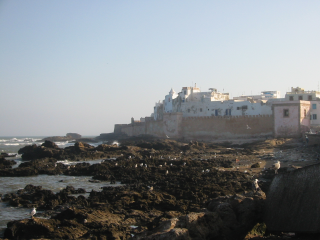
Théodore Cornut designed the Royal quarters or kasbah of the city of Essaouira.

Théodore Cornut, also Cornout, was a French mathematician and military architect of the 18th century, born in Avignon, who worked for the King of Morocco.

Cornut initially worked as an architect for military fortifications in Roussillon. He then entered the service of the English Crown, and participated to the Seven Years' War. Later, based in Gibraltar, he was invited by Sidi Mohamed ben Abdallah, an Alaouite Sultan, to build the city of Mogador (modern Essaouira) in 1766.

Cornut was to use the services of hundreds of French Christian prisoners, who had been taken during a failed assault in 1765 Larache expedition.

He designed the city of Essaouira, and built it with the help of the prisoners. He built the surrounding walls similar to those of St Malo, and organized the streets of the Medina quarter according to a grid system.

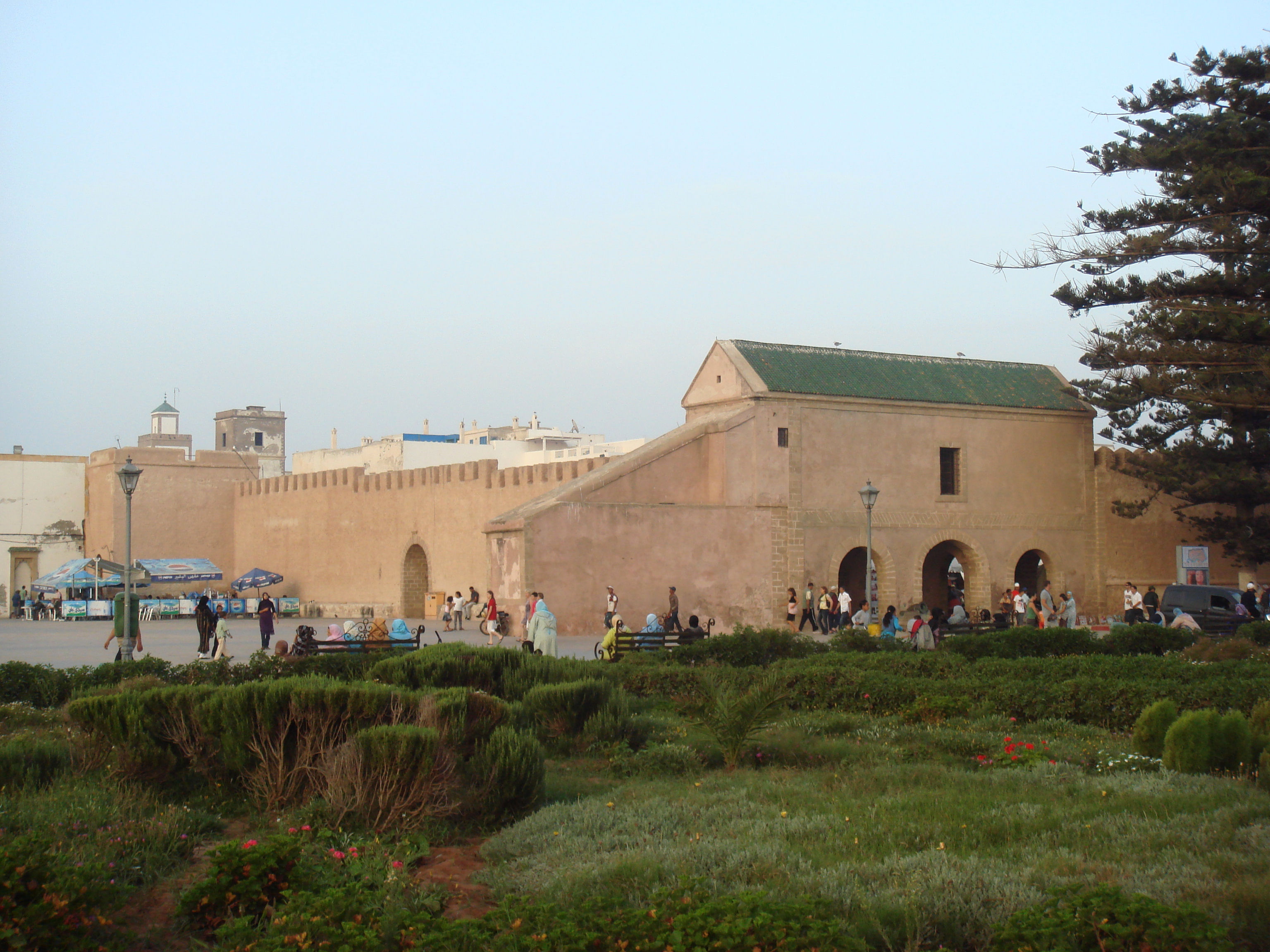
Walls of the Essaouira Kasbah designed and built by Cornut.

Cornut only designed and built the Royal quarters, or kasbah area, of the current city. The rest of the medina was built afterwards, as were the sqalas, such as the harbour fortifications and the northern sqala fortifications.

Overwhelmed by the amount of work involved in the construction of Essaouira, Cornut left his position after a year. He returned to France, where he drew his map of Essaouira with the planned constructions envisioned for the Sultan.
