= Ksar es-Seghir =

Town in Tanger-Tetouan-Al Hoceima, Morocco

Ksar es-Seghir القصر الصغير Ksar Sghir (French) Alcazarseguir (Spanish) Alcácer Ceguer (Portuguese)
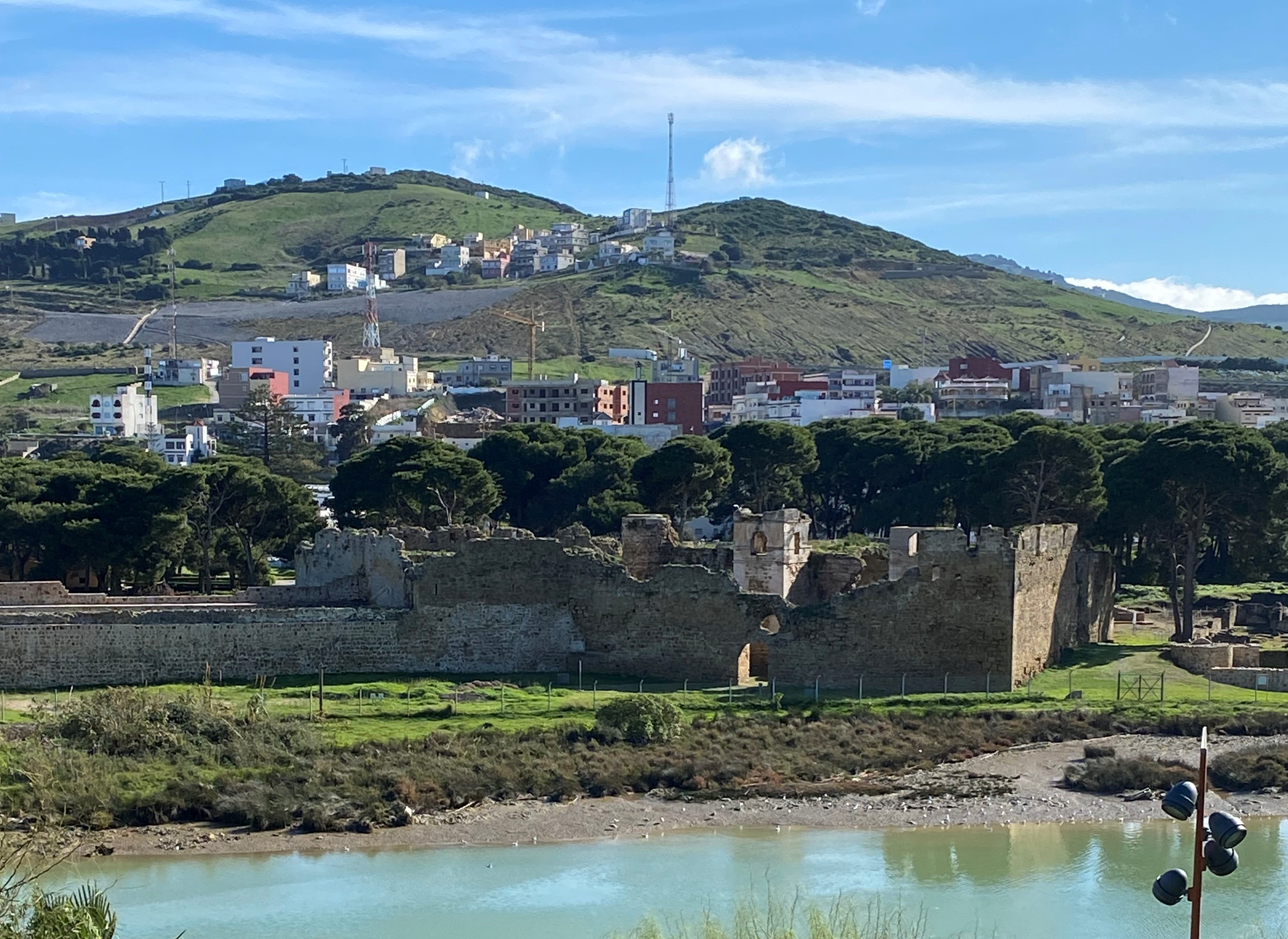
- Portuguese-era fortress at Ksar es-Seghir

- Location in Morocco Ksar es-Seghir (Africa)
- Coordinates: 35°50′31″N 5°33′31″W
- Country: Morocco
- Region: Tanger-Tetouan-Al Hoceima
- Province: Fahs-Anjra
- Established: c. 708-09

Population (2004)
  - Total: 10,995
- Time zone: UTC+0 (GMT)

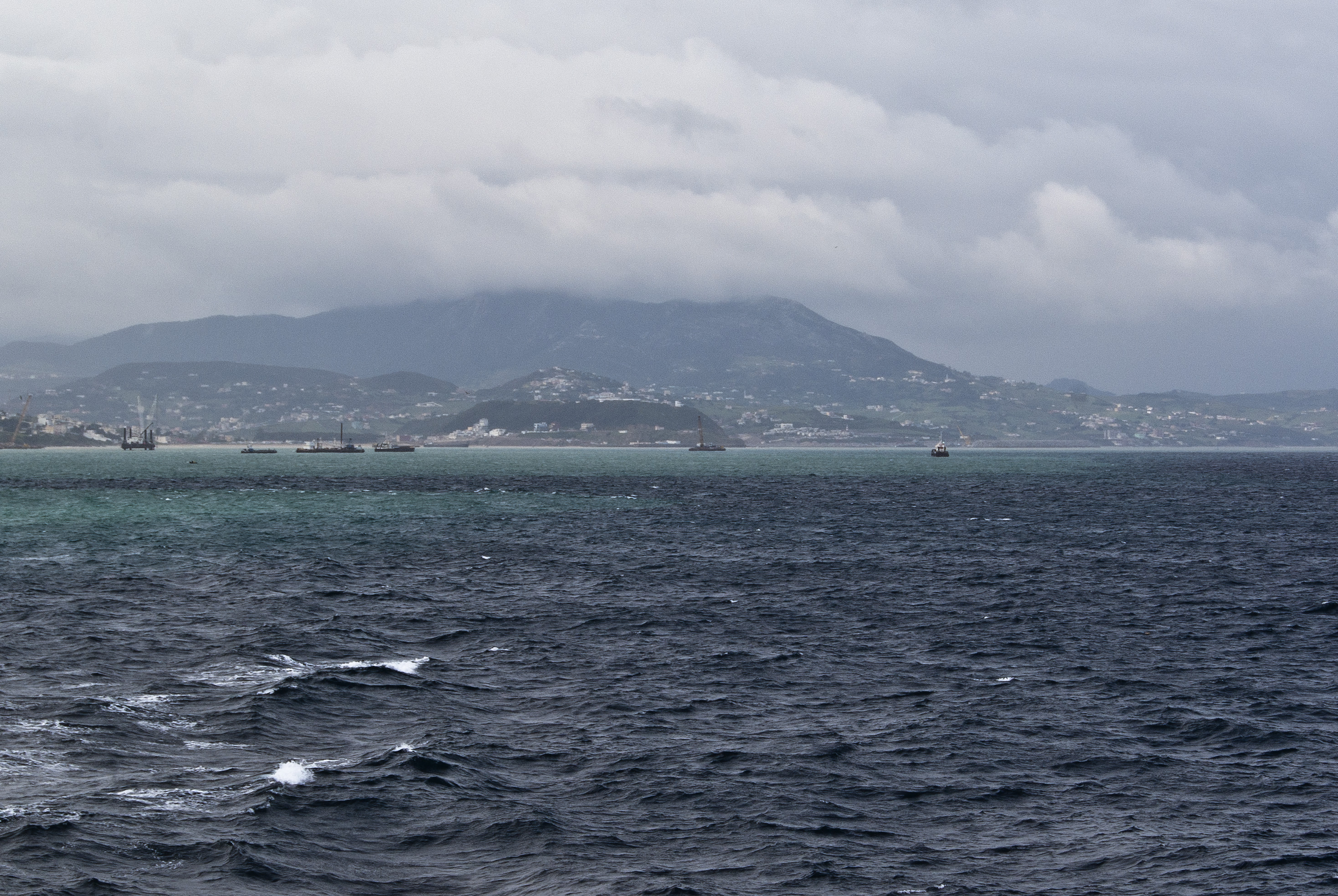
Landscape of Ksar es-Seghir

Ksar es-Seghir (Arabic: القصر الصغير, romanized: al-Qṣar aṣ-Ṣeghīr), also known by numerous other spellings and names, is a small town on the Mediterranean coast in the Jebala region of northwest Morocco, between Tangier and Ceuta, on the right bank of the river of the same name. Administratively, it belongs to Fahs-Anjra Province and the region of Tanger-Tetouan-Al Hoceima. By the census of 2004, it had a population of 10,995 inhabitants.

The city is circular, a design unusual in medieval Moroccan town planning. It is built from brick and ashlar masonry and flanked by semi-circular masonry towers. There are three monumental doors in the wall, each flanked by square towers. The Bāb al-Bahr (door of the sea), has an elbowed entrance for defensive purposes. These doors were used both for communication and trade and for taxation purposes.

== Names ==
The Moroccan Arabic name, meaning "The Small Castle", can be transcribed l-Qṣər ṣ-Ṣġir or Ksar Sghir. The name distinguishes it from Ksar-el-Kebir ("The Big Castle"), which is farther south. The Spanish name used to translate this as Castillejo but now transliterates it as Alcázar Seguir or Alcazarseguir; its Portuguese equivalent is Alcácer-Ceguer. Under the Almoravids and Almohads, it was known as Qasr al-Majaz, Ksar al-Majar, or Ksar al-Djawaz ("castle en route") because it was an important embarkation port for Moroccan troops on their way to Spain. Other names for the Muslim fortification include the 11th-century geographer al-Bakri's al-Qasr al-Awwal ("The First Castle") and the 13th-century historian Abdelwahid al-Marrakushi's Ksar Masmuda ("Masmuda Castle"), after the local Berber tribe.

In antiquity, it was known by the names Lissa and Exilissa (Ancient Greek: Ἐξίλισσα), which Lipiński conjectures represent the survival of the Phoenician settlement's name Ḥiq or Ḥeq-še-Elišša ("Bay of Elissa"). Note, however, that Pliny and Lipiński place the ancient settlement further east, closer to Benzú. The Byzantine Greek name was Exilýssa (Εξιλύσσα).

== Geography ==
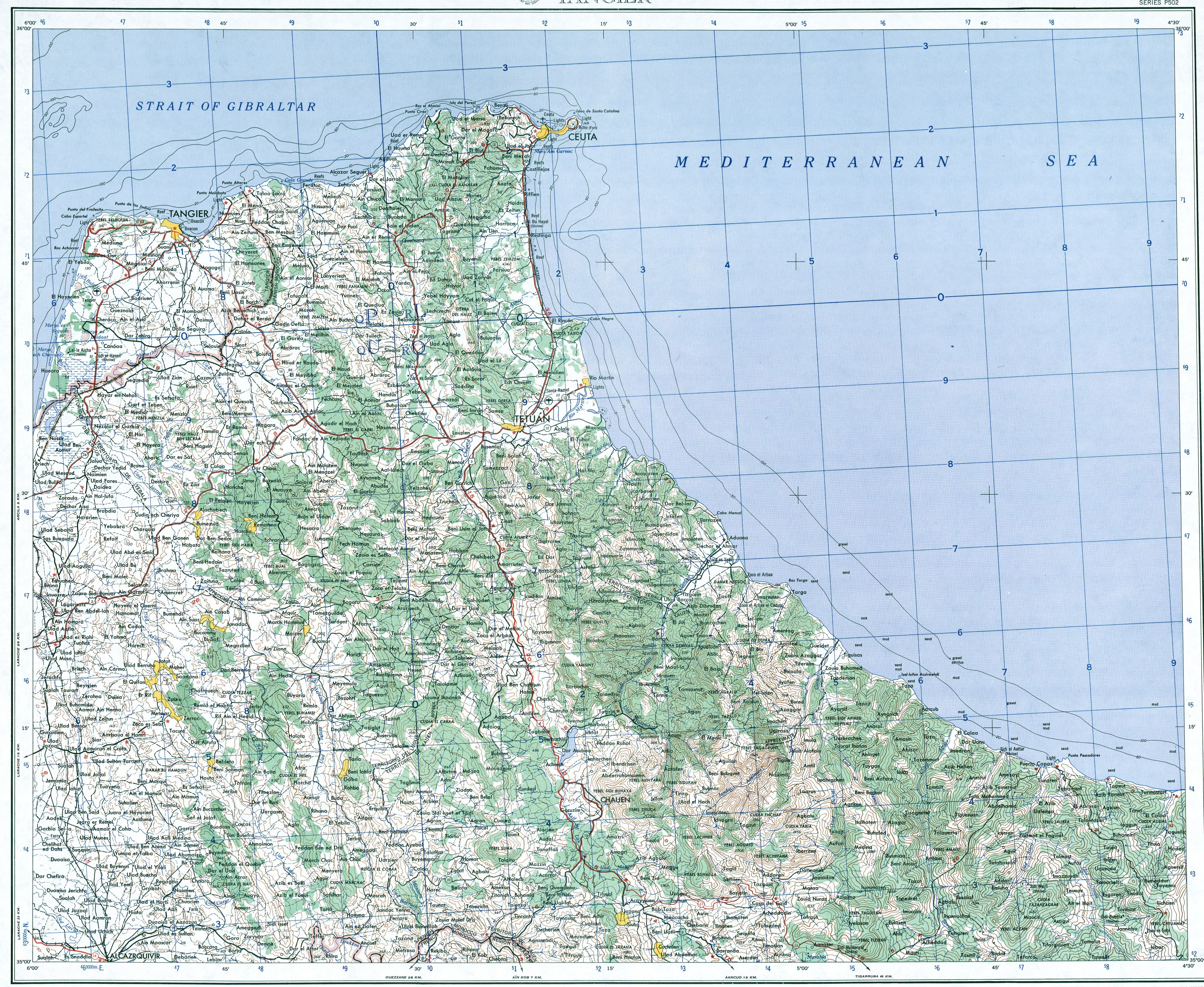
Topographic map of the region around Ksar es-Seghir (1954 map)

Ksar es-Seghir is located in the Strait of Gibraltar about halfway between Tangier and Ceuta. Situated in a bay on a stretch of coast that is relatively difficult to access by sea or land, Ksar es-Seghir never grew in size to rival the other north Moroccan ports. However, its sheltered position made it attractive as a military landing ground, a place for the safe and orderly embarkation and disembarkation of sea-borne troops, with little danger of disruption or molestation by enemy action.

== History ==
Exilissa was probably established as a Phoenician colony, annexed by the Carthaginians, and then lost to Roman control sometime after the Punic Wars. Under the Romans, it was a salting post. It would've been overrun by the Vandals in the 5th century and then reconquered by the Byzantines in the 6th. Ksar Mesmouda was established after the Umayyad conquest of the area in 708-709 CE. In 971, the Umayyad Caliph of al-Andalus tried to capture the fort as a stepping stone to a projected conquest of Idrisid Morocco. During the Almoravid and Almohad eras, it was used as a major shipyard.

In 1287, Marinid sultan Abu Yaqub Yusuf erected a new set of thick walls around the circular town, with 29 bastions and three monumental gates (Bab al-Bahr, Bab Sebta, Bab Fes). But with the end of Marinid adventures across the sea in Spain, it declined in use. By the 15th century, it had become a notorious corsair's nest, preying on shipping in the Straits of Gibraltar.

In 1458, a Portuguese expeditionary force of 25,000 men and 200 ships led by King Afonso V of Portugal, assaulted and captured the town after a two-day battle on 23–24 October. The Marinid sultan Abd al-Haqq II of Morocco attempted to recover it immediately, laying sieges in late 1458 and again in the summer of 1459, to no avail. It would remain in Portuguese hands for much of the next century, known by the name of 'Alcácer-Ceguer'. In 1502, the Portuguese began a new set of fortifications that extended the town's walls well into the sea, thereby ensuring a shielded landing ground for Portuguese expeditionary forces in Africa. The resident population of the town under the Portuguese reached around 800 persons.

Finding Portuguese holdings in Morocco expensive to maintain, King John III of Portugal decided to abandon it in 1533, although the final evacuation of Ksar es-Seghir would be delayed until 1549. It was recovered by Morocco thereafter, but the departing Portuguese had taken the trouble to evacuate the population, dismantle much of the fortifications and town, and dump debris and sand into the harbor, diminishing its immediate usefulness. In 1609, Ksar es-Seghir became a destination for Moriscos expelled from Spain.

Having lost its role as a transit port, Ksar es-Seghir collapsed in size and importance thereafter, becoming a relatively insignificant fishing town, amid the ruins of the old Moroccan citadel and Portuguese fort. A more modern town arose later, on the right bank of the river, across from the old citadel. Ksar Sghir got a new lease on life in the 21st century, when it was slated as the site of a new naval base for the Royal Moroccan Navy (construction begun 2008, operational 2010). In 2007, a new commercial cargo port, Tanger-Med began being built nearby, around twelve kilometers to the northeast of Ksar Sghir.

== See also ==
- European enclaves in North Africa before 1830
