= Souira Guedima =

Souira Guedima Aguz
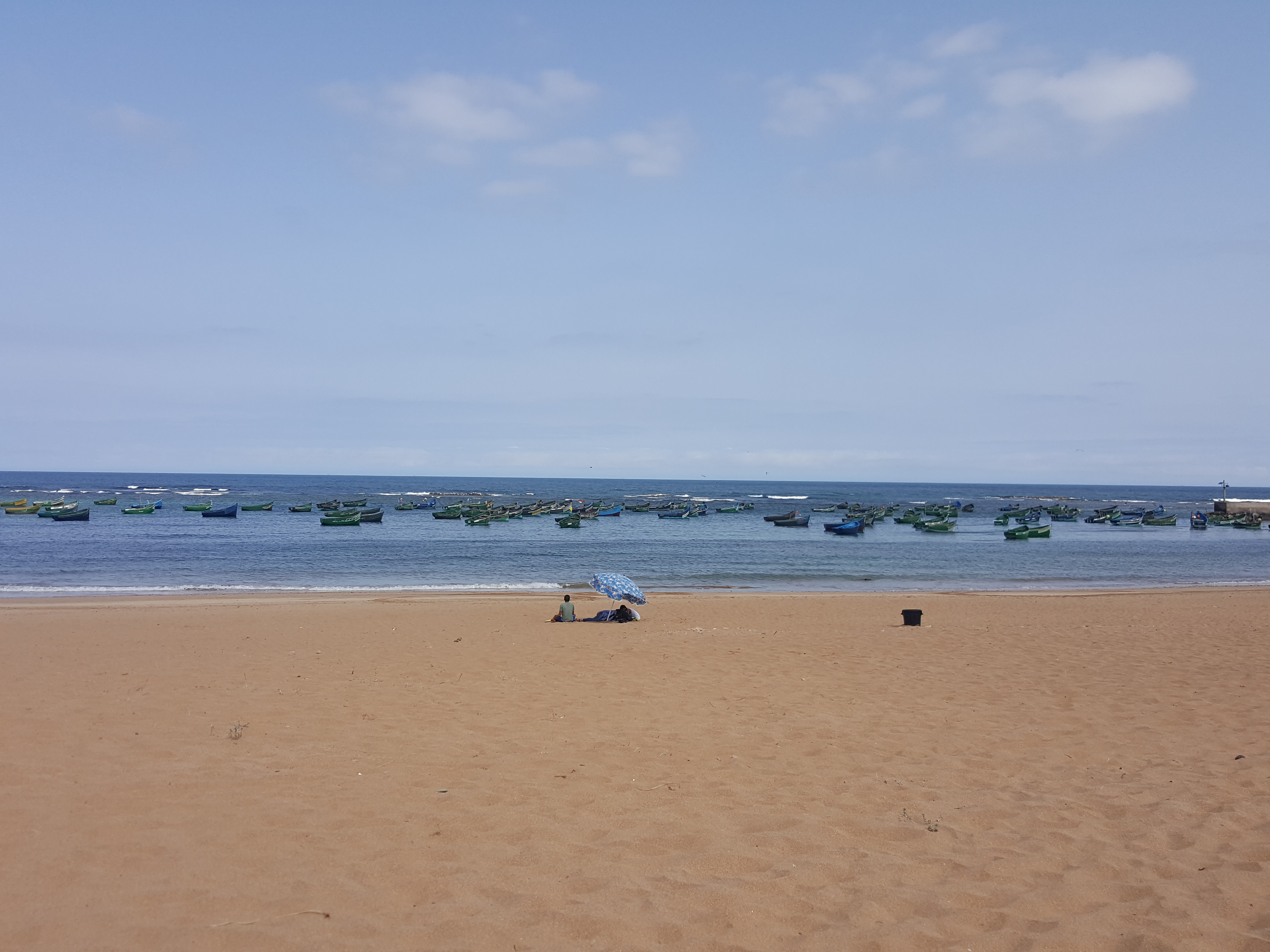
- Interactive map of Souira Guedima
- Coordinates: 32°2′N 9°20′W
- Country: Morocco
- Region: Marrakesh-Safi
- Province: Safi
- Time zone: UTC+0 (GMT)

Souira Guedima, formerly known as Aguz, is a Moroccan town 36 km south of Safi, at the mouth of the Tensift River on the Atlantic seacoast. Guedima may also be spelt Kadima, Kdima, Qadima (best English transliteration), or Qdima. Aguz may also be spelt Agouz, Gouz or Couz. it is the main town of the Lamaachate commune.

== History ==
The town was an important port in the 11th century, serving the city of Aghmat which was inland 3 days journey to the east.

=== Portuguese fortress ===
Between 1506 and 1525 the stronghold of Aguz was an enclave under Portuguese colonial rule, as were various other Moroccan towns, such as Safim (Safi) (1488–1541) .

It was governed by the following Portuguese Captains:

- 1506–09 - Diogo de Azambuja, Sr.
- c. 1510–16 - Francisco Mendes
- 15..–c. 22 - Diogo de Azambuja, Jr.
- 152.–25 - Gonçalo Mendes Sacoto

== Gallery ==
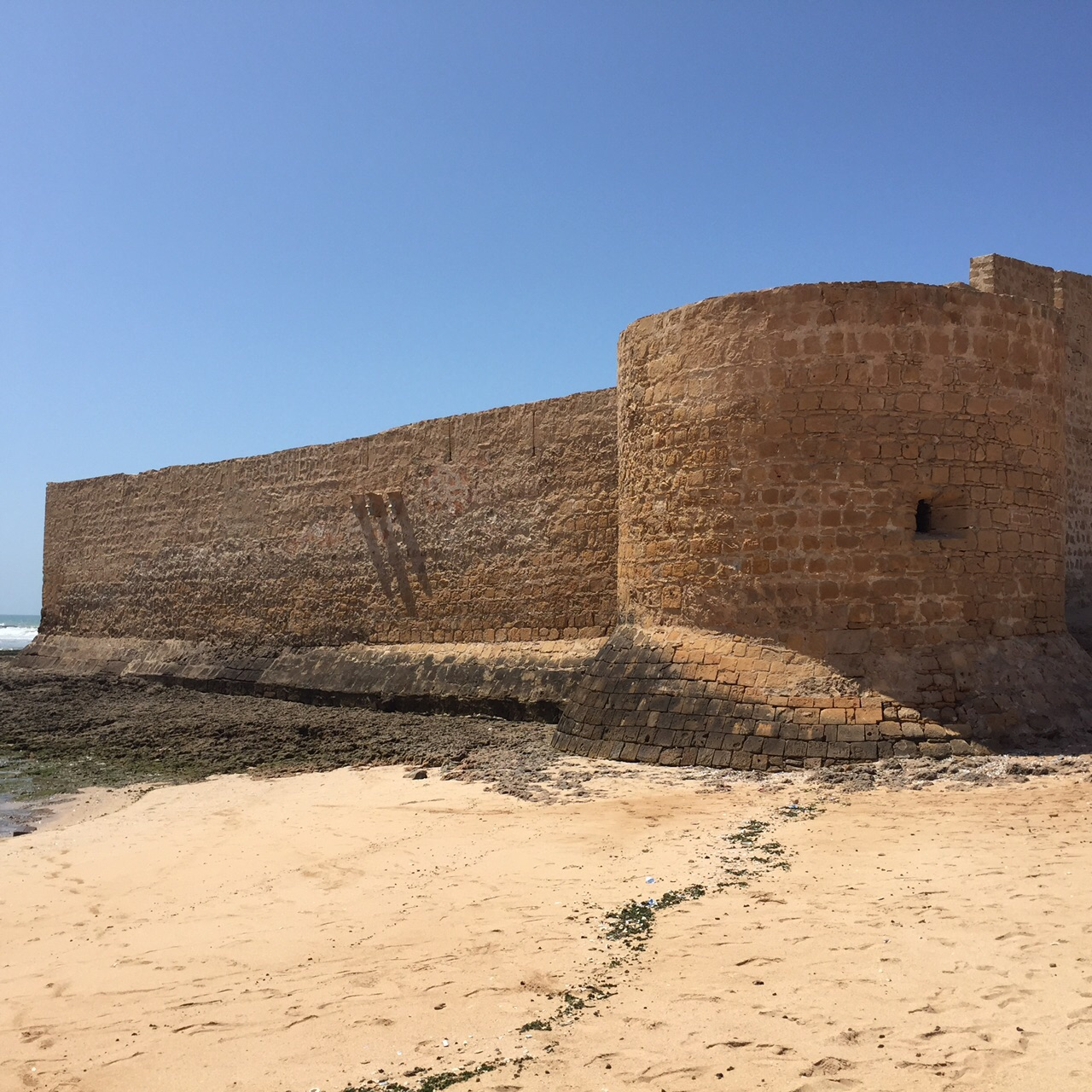
The small fort of Souira Qdima which date back to the 16th century

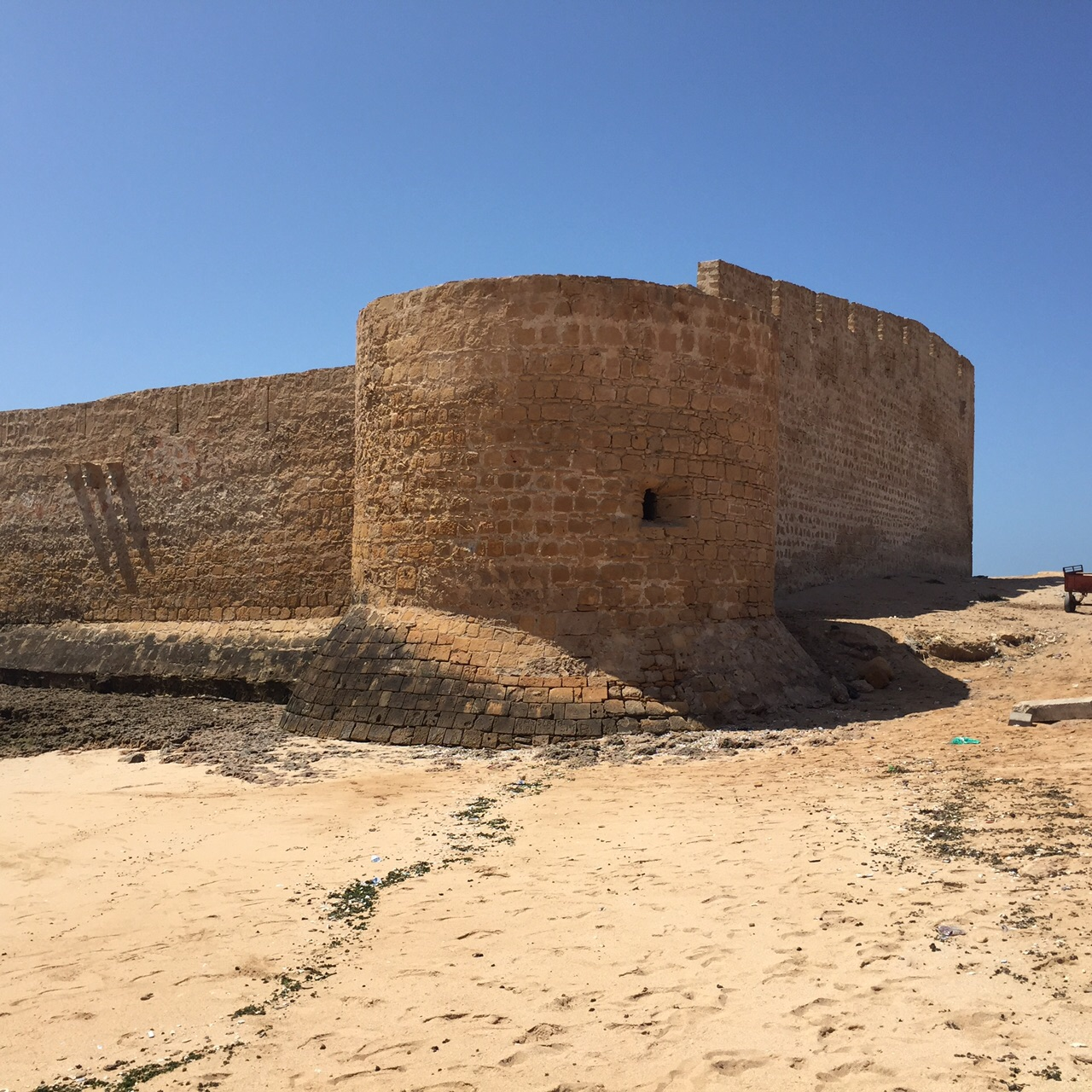
The small fort of Souira Qdima which date back to the 16th century

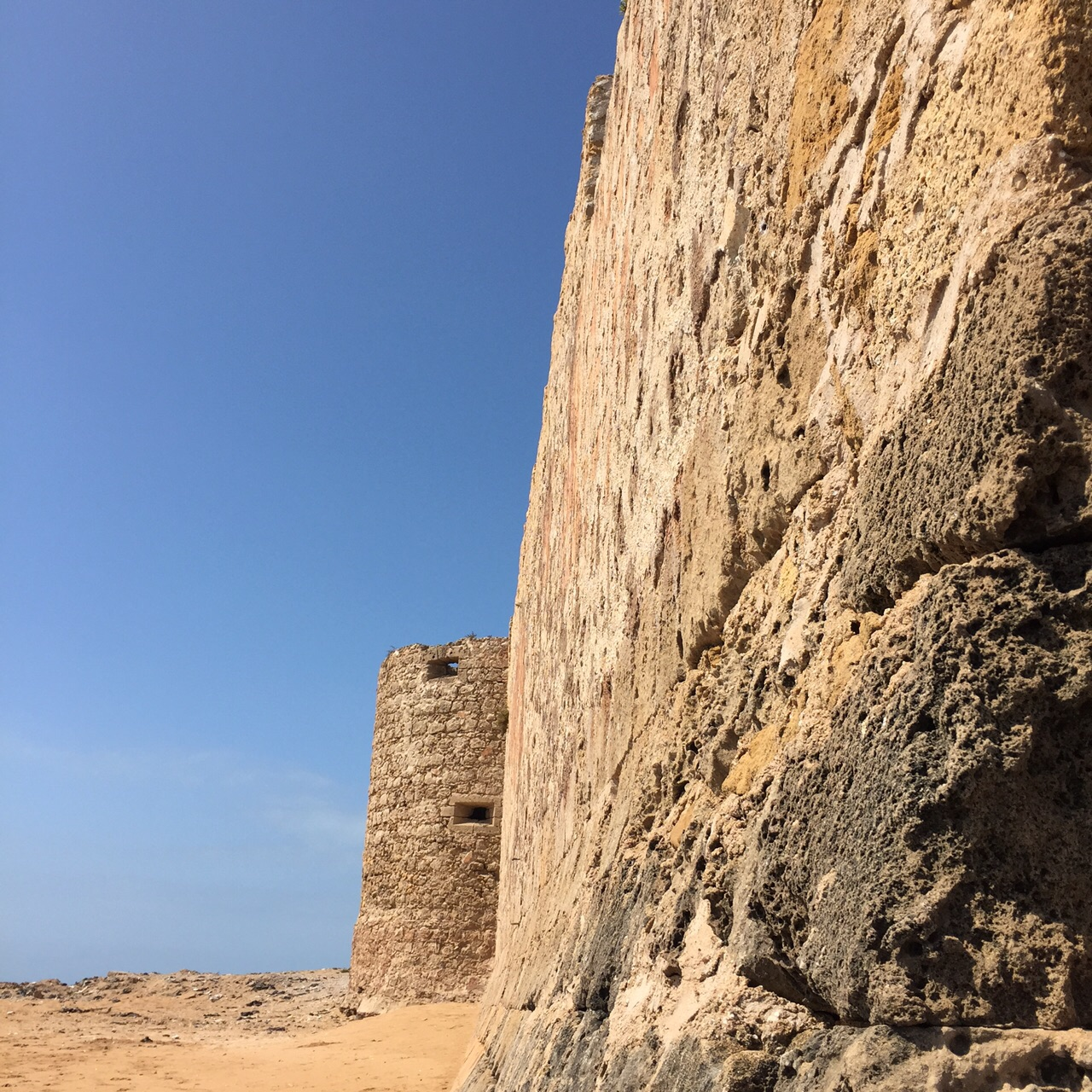
The small fort of Souira Qdima which date back to the 16th century

== Sources ==
- WorldStatesmen- Morocco
