= Count of Valença =

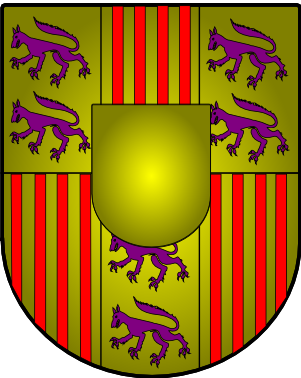
The Coat of Arms of Henrique de Menezes, 1st Count of Valença.

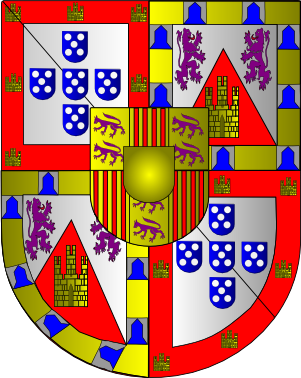
The Coat of Arms of the Marquesses of Vila Real, also Counts of Valença.

Count of Valença (in Portuguese Conde de Valença) was a Portuguese title of nobility, created by a royal decree, dated from July 20, 1464, by King Afonso V of Portugal, and granted to Dom Henrique de Menezes, who was already 3rd Count of Viana (da Foz do Lima) and 4th Count of Viana (do Alentejo).

However, on November 12, 1471, he gave back to the Crown the County of Valença and received in exchange the County of Loulé.

Later, on December 12, 1499, by a royal decree issued by King Manuel I of Portugal, the County of Valença was granted again this time to Dom Fernando de Menezes who was already 2nd Marquis of Vila Real, 4th Count of Vila Real, 1st Count of Alcoutim, a cousin to the 1st Count.

== List of counts of Valença ==
1. Henrique de Meneses, 4th Count of Viana, 3rd Count of Viana (da Foz do Lima) and 1st Count of Loulé;
2. Fernando de Menezes, 2nd Marquis of Vila Real (1463- ? ), also known as Ferdinand II of Menezes, 4th Count of Vila Real and 1st Count of Alcoutim;
3. Pedro de Menezes, 3rd Marquis of Vila Real (1486- ? ), also known as Peter III of Meneses, 5th Count of Vila Real
4. Miguel de Menezes, 4th Marquis of Vila Real (1520- ? ), also known as Michael I of Menezes, 6th Count of Vila Real
5. Manuel de Meneses, 5th Marquis of Vila Real (1530- ? ), also known as Manuel of Menezes, 1st Duke of Vila Real and 7th Count of Vila Real;
6. Miguel Luís, 6th Marquis of Vila Real (1565–1637), also known as Michael II of Menezes, 1st Duke of Caminha and 8th Count of Vila Real;
7. Luis de Noronha e Meneses (1570–1641), also known as Louis of Menezes, 7th Marquis of Vila Real, 9th Count of Vila Real

== Counts of Valenza and Valladares (Spanish title) ==
When the 7th Marquis of Vila Real, 7th Count of Valença, along with his son the Duke of Caminha, was executed in Portugal for high treason in 1641, his daughter, Beatrice of Menezes, married to the Spanish Count of Medellin, remained in Spain.

To reward her fidelity towards the Spanish Habsburgs, King Philip IV of Spain gave her, the 23 March 1660, the title of Countess of Valenza and Valladares (Spanish spelling) as a Spanish title with, included today among the titles of the House of Medinaceli.

Beatrice of Menezes never returned to her homeland and this title was never recognized in Portugal

=== Counts of Valenza and Valladares (1660-) ===
- Beatriz de Meneses, 1st Countess of Valenza and Valladares (1614–1668)
- Pedro Damián Portocarrero, 9th Count of Medellín and 2nd Count of Valenza and Valladares (1640–1704), eldest son of the 1st Countess.
- Luisa Feliciana Portocarrero, 10th Countess of Medellín and 3rd Countess of Valenza and Valladares (1641–1705), elder surviving daughter of the 1st Countess.
- Guillén Ramón de Moncada, 6th Marquis of Aitona and 4th Count of Valenza and Valladares (1671–1727), eldest son of the 3rd Countess.
- María Teresa de Moncada, 7th Marquise of Aitona and 5th Countess of Valenza and Valladares (1707–1756), eldest daughter of the 4th Count.
- Pedro de Alcántara Fernández de Córdoba, 12th Duke of Medinaceli and 6th Count of Valenza and Valladares (1730–1789), eldest son of the 5th Countess.
- Luis Fernández de Córdoba, 13th Duke of Medinaceli and 7th Count of Valenza and Valladares (1749–1806), eldest son of the 6th Count.
- Luis Fernández de Córdoba, 14th Duke of Medinaceli and 8th Count of Valenza and Valladares (1780–1840), eldest son of the 7th Count.
- Luis Fernández de Córdoba, 15th Duke of Medinaceli and 9th Count of Valenza and Valladares (1813–1873), elder son of the 8th Count.
- Luis Fernández de Córdoba, 16th Duke of Medinaceli and 10th Count of Valenza and Valladares (1851–1879), elder son of the 9th Count.
- Luis Fernández de Córdoba, 17th Duke of Medinaceli and 11th Count of Valenza and Valladares (1880–1956), elder son of the 10th Count.
- Victoria Eugenia Fernández de Córdoba, 18th Duchess of Medinaceli and 12th Countess of Valenza and Valladares (b. 1956), eldest daughter of the 11th Count.

The heiress apparent is Ana Luisa de Medina, Marquise of Navahermosa (b. 1940).

== See also ==
- Duke of Vila Real
- Duke of Caminha
- Marquis of Vila Real
- Count of Vila Real
- Count of Alcoutim
- Dukedoms in Portugal
- List of marquisates in Portugal
- List of countships in Portugal

== Bibliography ==
”Nobreza de Portugal e do Brasil" – Vol. III, page 467. Published by Zairol Lda., Lisbon 1989.
