= Pedro de Meneses, 1st Count of Vila Real =

Portuguese nobleman and military officer (1370–1437)

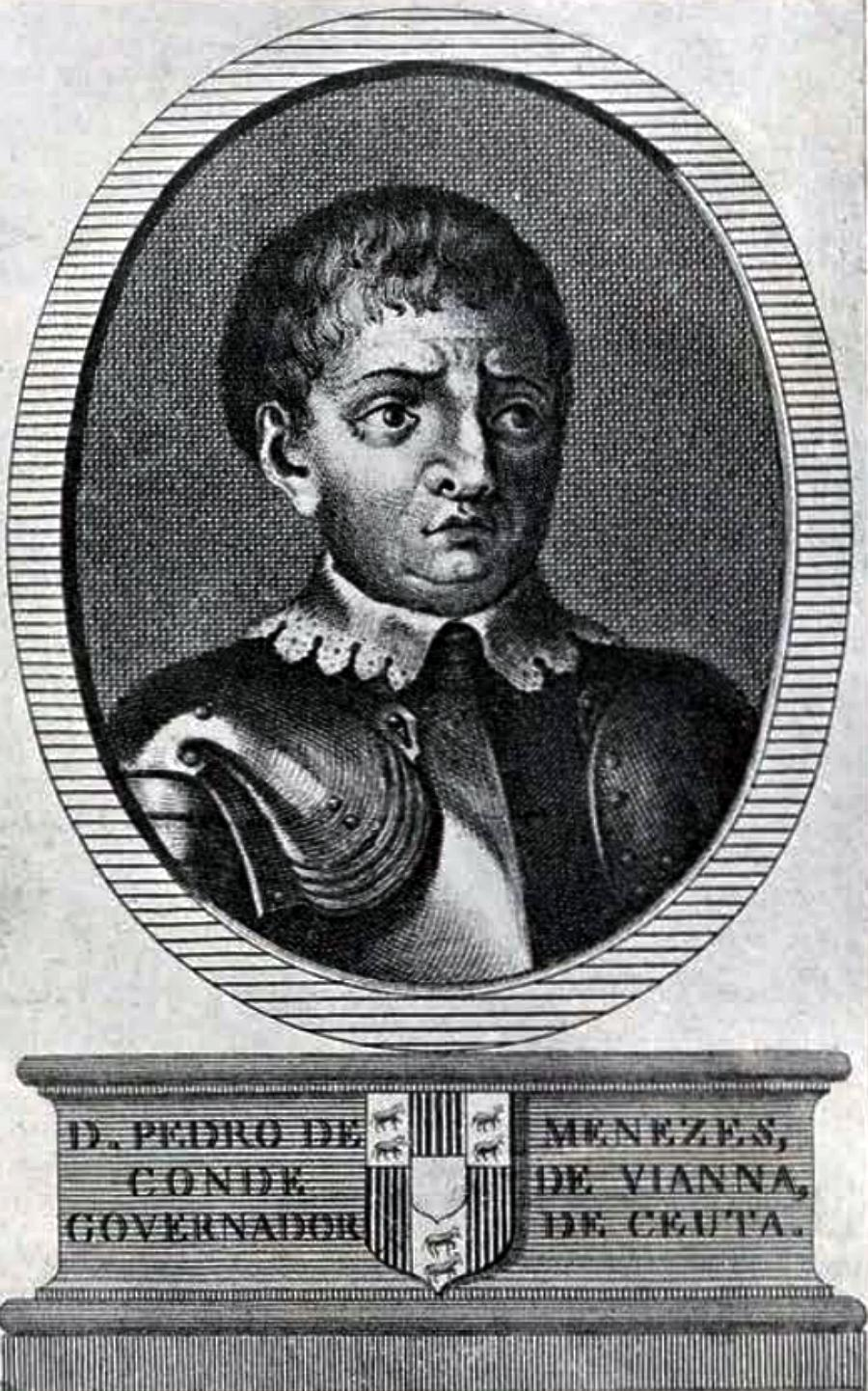
Dom Pedro de Menezes, Count of Vianna.

Pedro de Menezes Portocarrero (1370 – Ceuta, 22 September 1437) was a 15th-century Portuguese nobleman and military figure. Pedro de Menezes (sometimes modernized as 'de Meneses') was the 2nd Count of Viana do Alentejo, 1st Count of Vila Real and the first Portuguese governor of Ceuta.

Pedro de Menezes was the grandson of the powerful 14th-century nobleman João Afonso Telo, 1st Count of Ourém and 4th Count of Barcelos, and his wife Guiomar Lopes Pacheco. Pedro was the cousin of Leonor Teles, the scandalous but powerful consort of King Ferdinand I of Portugal.

During the 1383–1385 Crisis, Pedro's father, also called João Afonso Telo like his father, had supported Beatrice of Portugal against the pretender John, Master of Aviz (the future John I). Nonetheless, unlike many other nobles, Pedro de Menezes had been allowed to inherit his father's title of Count of Viana do Alentejo and proved himself a faithful loyalist of King John I. He also inherited the Castilian lordships of Ayllón and Aguilar from relatives, but these titles were not recognized in Portugal.

== Legend ==
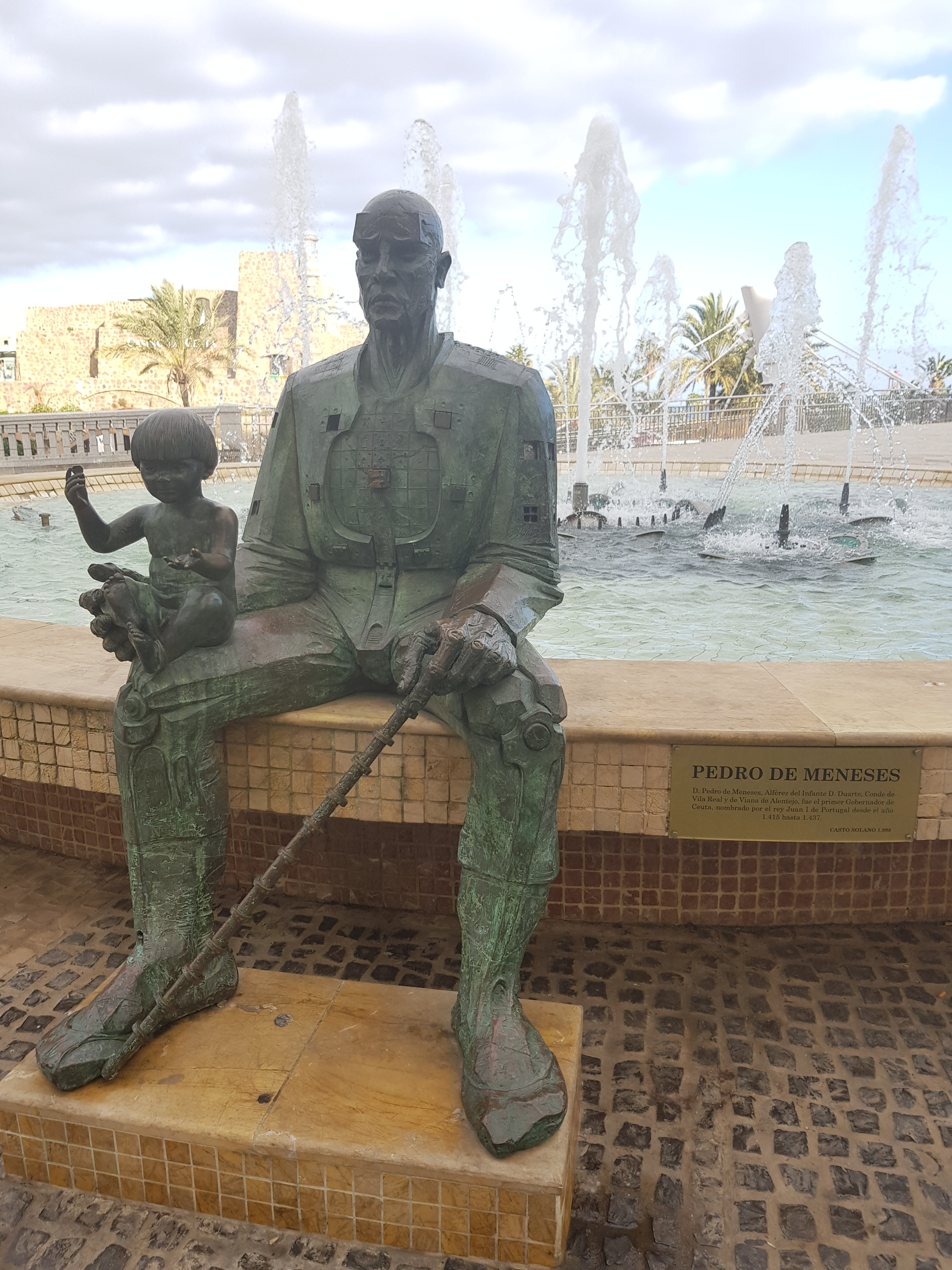
Statue of Pedro de Meneses, in Ceuta.

While John I of Portugal was canvassing for governors, the young Pedro was nearby, distractedly playing choca (a kind of Medieval hockey) with a stick of zambujeiro or aleo (wild olive tree). Hearing all the high nobles making excuses to avoid the job, the young Pedro de Menezes stepped forward and approached the king with his gaming stick (aleo) in hand and told him that, with only that stick, he could defend Ceuta from all the power of Morocco. As a result of this story, all future Portuguese governors of Ceuta would be presented with a zambujeiro staff as a symbol of their office upon their investiture. The aleo that was used by Pedro is kept in the Church of Santa María de África in Ceuta, the statue of Mary holds the aleo.

== First Governor of Ceuta ==
Pedro de Menezes participated and distinguished himself in the 1415 Conquest of Ceuta, and, in the aftermath, was appointed by King John I of Portugal as the first Portuguese governor of Ceuta. Allegedly, he was the only Portuguese noble willing to remain in charge of the Portuguese garrison, which was sure to be attacked by the full force of Marinid Morocco in due time. Pedro de Menezes was left with a garrison of 1600 soldiers. In 1416, Prince Henry the Navigator was placed in charge of supplying provisions from Portugal to the garrison.

In 1418 (or 1419), the armies of the Marinid rulers of Morocco, assisted by auxiliary forces from the Nasrid Emirate of Granada, finally gathered and laid siege to the citadel. Pedro de Menezes managed the defenses of the citadel, while princes Henry the Navigator and John of Reguengos were dispatched with a relief fleet from Portugal. According to the chroniclers, the relief fleet turned out to be quite unnecessary. In a bold gambit, Pedro de Menezes led the Portuguese garrison in a sally against the Marinid camp and forced the lifting of the siege before the relief fleet even arrived.

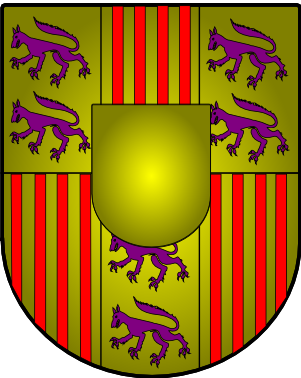
Arms of D. Pedro de Meneses, 1st Count of Vila Real.

Blamed for losing Ceuta, the Marinid sultan was assassinated in a coup in Fez in 1420, leaving only a child as his heir. Morocco descended into anarchic chaos, as rival pretenders vied for the throne and local governors carved out regional fiefs for themselves, selling their support to the highest bidder. The political crisis in Morocco released the pressure on Ceuta for the next few years, leaving Pedro de Menezes and the Portuguese garrison with little to do, but entrench themselves in the largely empty fortress-citadel. They were only occasionally pestered by small parties of Moroccan nobles, who came to challenge Portuguese knights to feats of arms and personal combat, or scrappy columns of Sufi-inspired religious radicals looking for Holy War. Although the Portuguese crown was losing substantial amounts of money maintaining the expensive garrison, Pedro de Menezes is said to have accumulated a small personal fortune from ransoming Moroccan knights captured in skirmishes and from kickbacks from the corsairs he allowed to operate out of Ceuta. He is said to have lent substantial sums to the perennially indebted Henry the Navigator.

In 1423, Pedro de Menezes briefly returned to Portugal to settle some domestic affairs. In 1424, Pedro de Menezes was invested with his mother's dominions as the first Count of Vila Real by King John I of Portugal and appointed the alferes-mor (standard-bearer) of the royal prince and heir Infante Edward. That same year, he secured from the king a royal letter legitimizing his natural son, Duarte de Menezes. Around 1430 Pedro de Menezes once again returned to Portugal, leaving Ceuta under the command of his 16-year-old son Duarte de Menezes and his lieutenant (and son-in-law) Rui Gomes da Silva. During this second sojourn, Pedro de Menezes received the title of Admiral of Portugal in 1433, as dowry for his marriage to Genebra Pereira (daughter of the admiral Carlos II Pessanha). Pedro de Menezes returned to Ceuta soon after (c. 1434), but his bride did not survive the journey.

In 1436–37, preparations were underway in Portugal for a renewed campaign against Morocco, seeking to capture Tangier and several other coastal citadels. In anticipation, in 1436, Pedro de Menezes ordered the garrison from Ceuta, led by young Duarte, to attack and raze the citadel of Tétouan, to prevent it from becoming a threat to the Portuguese operations. The Portuguese expeditionary force, led by Henry the Navigator, arrived in Ceuta in August 1437, and were greeted with great pomp by D. Pedro de Menezes, who offered to join the force and personally lead the garrison from Ceuta in the campaign. As the ageing governor was already evidently ill, Henry turned down the offer and took his son Duarte de Menezes instead. Pedro de Menezes' condition took a turn for the worse shortly after and he died within the first week of the siege of Tangier. His son Duarte managed to rush back in time to receive his father's blessing on his deathbed.

Despite having married four times, Pedro de Menezes did not have any direct male heirs. His legitimized bastard son Duarte de Menezes inherited his father's old dominion of Count of Viana do Alentejo, but the crown-granted title of Count of Vila Real went to his eldest daughter Brites de Menezes and her consort, Fernando de Noronha. The title of Admiral of Portugal was inherited by his nephew, Lançarote da Cunha.

An account of the life and career of Pedro de Menezes was written down in 1463 by Portuguese chronicler Gomes Eanes de Zurara, Chronica do Conde D. Pedro de Menezes, which helped cement his reputation. It's said, among the many legendary stories that have circulated about him, that Pedro de Menezes wore a coat of mail continuously for sixteen years, wearing it out before ever taking it off.

Pedro de Menezes is sometimes denoted as Peter I, to distinguish him from his namesake grandson Peter II, the first Marquis of Vila Real, who was to serve as a later governor of Ceuta.

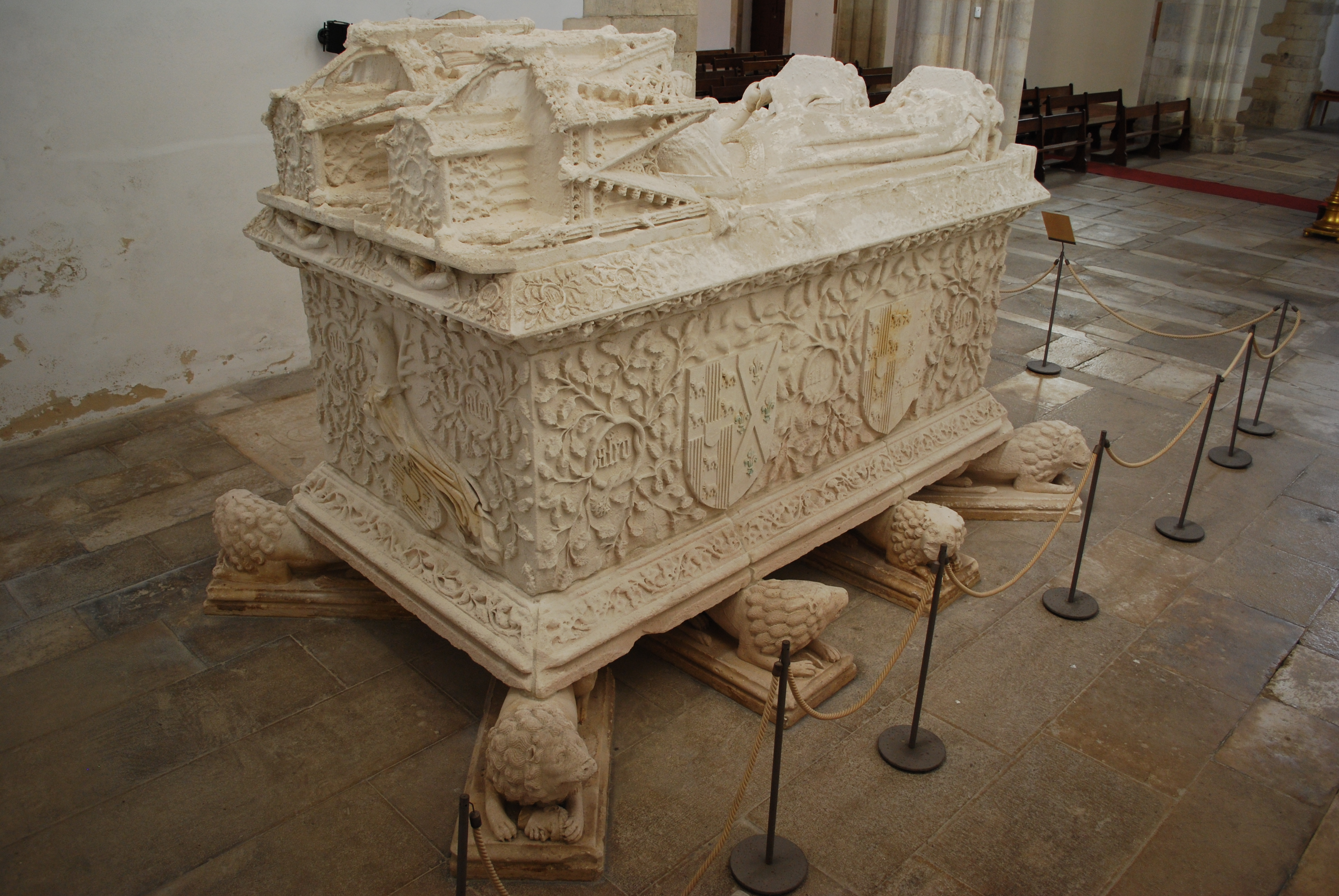
Tomb of Pedro de Menezes, in the Igreja da Graça in Santarém.

Pedro de Menezes was originally buried in the cathedral of Ceuta (a converted mosque), but his remains were later translated by his daughter to the Igreja da Graça in Santarém, Portugal. His remains are still found there, in an effigy tomb alongside his third wife, Brites Coutinho. His tomb is decorated with carved wild olive tree branches, and repeatedly embossed with the word aleo, a reference to the gaming stick that Pedro de Menezes made famous. The same motif and slogan, "aleu", is found in the coat of arms of the town of Vila Real, the seat of Pedro de Menezes' fief. It is also found on the coat of arms of the town of Alcoutim, where Pedro's descendants were later made Counts of Alcoutim.

Sixteenth-century poet Luís de Camões is believed to be referring to Pedro de Menezes' aleo episode in his first Ecloga, where the poet writes: "So long as from sturdy, wild olive trees, the shepherds of Luso can find gaming sticks (cajados) and the ancient valor that first made them so famous in the world, do not fear, Frondelio, my companion, that they shall be subdued at any time."

== Descendants ==
Pedro de Menezes was married four times.

The first marriage to Margarida de Miranda, the natural daughter of Martinho Afonso Pires de Charneca, Bishop of Coimbra (and soon Archbishop of Braga), produced two daughters:

- Brites de Menezes, 2nd Countess of Vila Real, who married Fernando de Noronha (co-count)
- Leonor de Menezes, who married Fernando II, 3rd Duke of Braganza.

The second marriage with Filipa Coutinho, daughter of Gonçalo Vasques Coutinho, 2nd Marshal of Portugal, did not produce offspring.

The third marriage to Brites Coutinho, daughter of Fernando Martins Coutinho, Lord of Castelo Rodrigo, produced one daughter:

- Isabel Coutinho, Lady of Mafra and Enxara dos Cavaleiros.

The fourth marriage with Genebra Pereira, daughter of Carlos II Pessanha, Admiral of Portugal, produced no offspring.

He also had illegitimate children.

From an unknown woman:

- Inês de Menezes, who married Gonçalo Nunes Barreto, 1st Lord of Morgado da Quarteira.

From Isabel Domingues, a Pixegueira:

- Duarte de Menezes, 3rd Count of Viana, first captain-governor of Alcácer-Ceguer;
- Aldonça de Menezes;
- Isabel de Menezes, who had 11 children with Rui Gomes da Silva, first Magistrate of Campo Maior, who served as Menezes' lieutenant in Ceuta; two are venerated in the Roman Catholic Church:
  - Blessed Amadeus of Portugal, O.F.M., a Franciscan friar who established a reformed branch of the Order of Friars Minor which existed independently for about a century;
  - Saint Beatrice of Silva, O.I.C., who founded the Conceptionist Order of contemplative nuns in Toledo, Spain.
