= Sanctuary of Saint Mary of Africa =

Coordinates: 35°53′8.28″N 5°19′46.55″W

Sanctuary of Santa María de África
- Santuario de Santa María de África
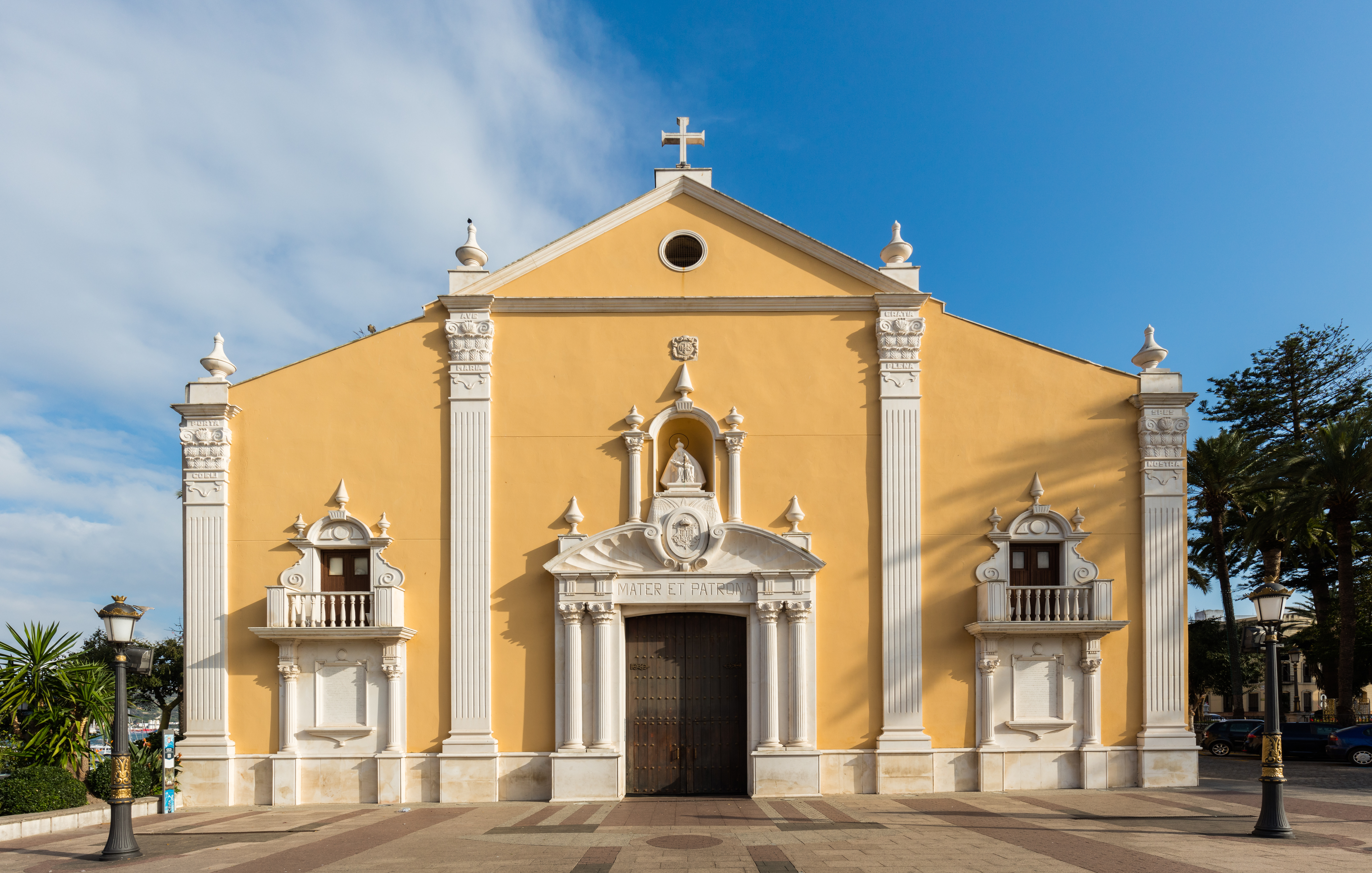
- The church today
- Sanctuary of Santa María de África
- Location: Ceuta
- Denomination: Roman Catholic

The Santuario de Santa María de África (English: Sanctuary of Saint Mary of Africa) is a Roman Catholic church in the Spanish city of Ceuta which is located in a small Spanish exclave on the north coast of Africa.

== History ==
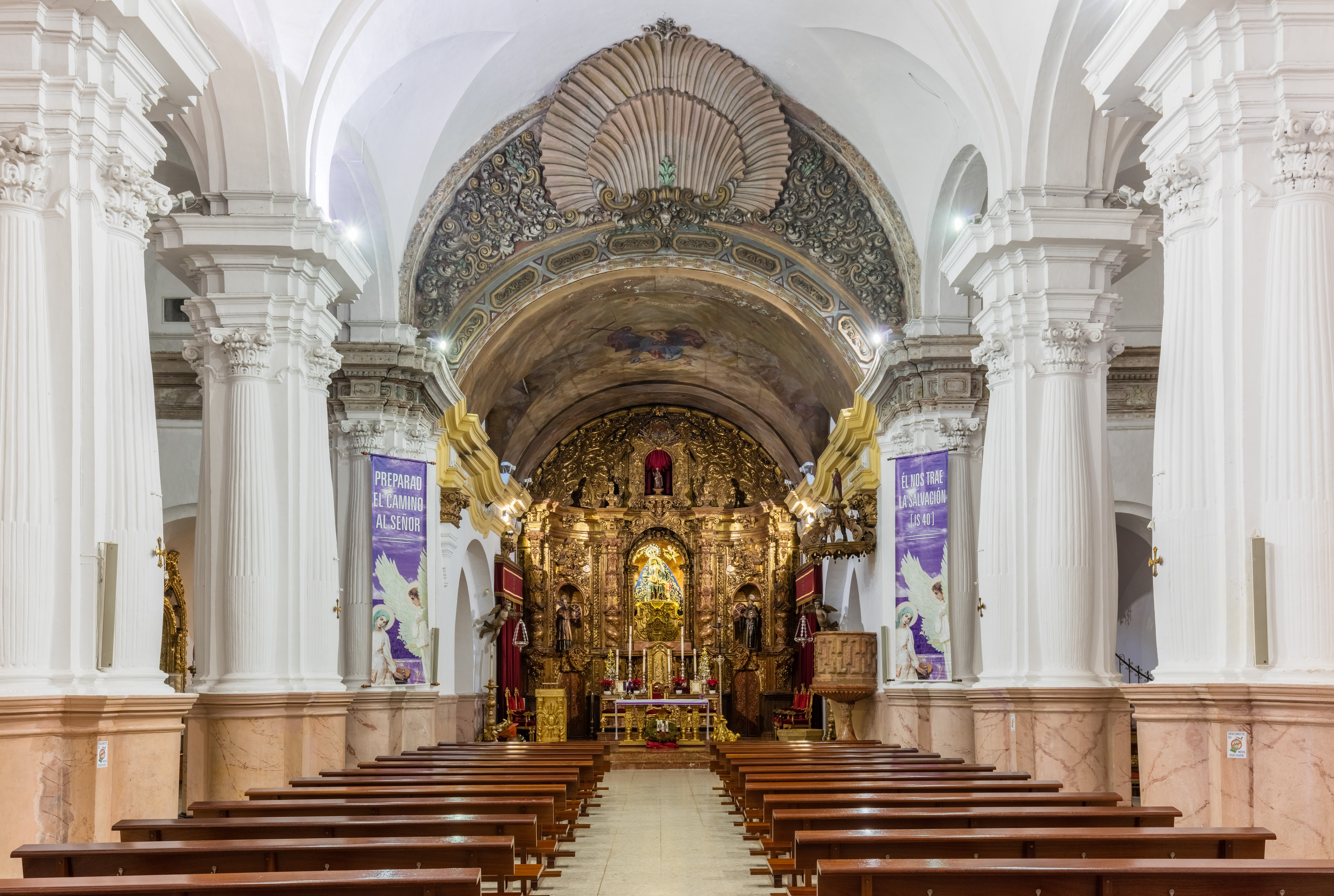
Main nave.

The history of the church goes back to a picture sent by Henry the Navigator. He said that he thought the picture holy and he named it as Santa Maria in Africa.

The first hard evidence of the church date from 1676 when it is mentioned in building work and then again in 1697. Under Bishop Don Martin de Barcia the church was internally decorated with paintings and both bells and the altarpiece were installed. We know that Barcia was still Bishop when the church was consecrated on 5 August 1752. The altarpiece is decorated with a large sculpture of Mary with Christ which is traditionally carved from a single piece of wood.

== Legend ==
While King John I of Portugal was canvassing for governors after capturing Ceuta in 1415, a young Pedro de Menezes, 1st Count of Vila Real was nearby, distractedly playing choca (a kind of Medieval hockey) with a stick of zambujeiro or Aleo (wild olive tree) from Alcoutim. Hearing all the high nobles making excuses to avoid the job, the young Pedro de Menezes stepped forward and approached the king with his gaming stick (aleo) in hand and told him that, with only that stick, he could defend Ceuta from all the power of Morocco. As a result of this story, all future Portuguese governors of Ceuta would be presented with a zambujeiro staff as a symbol of their office upon their investiture. The aleo that was used by Pedro is kept in the Church, the statue af Mary holds the aleo.

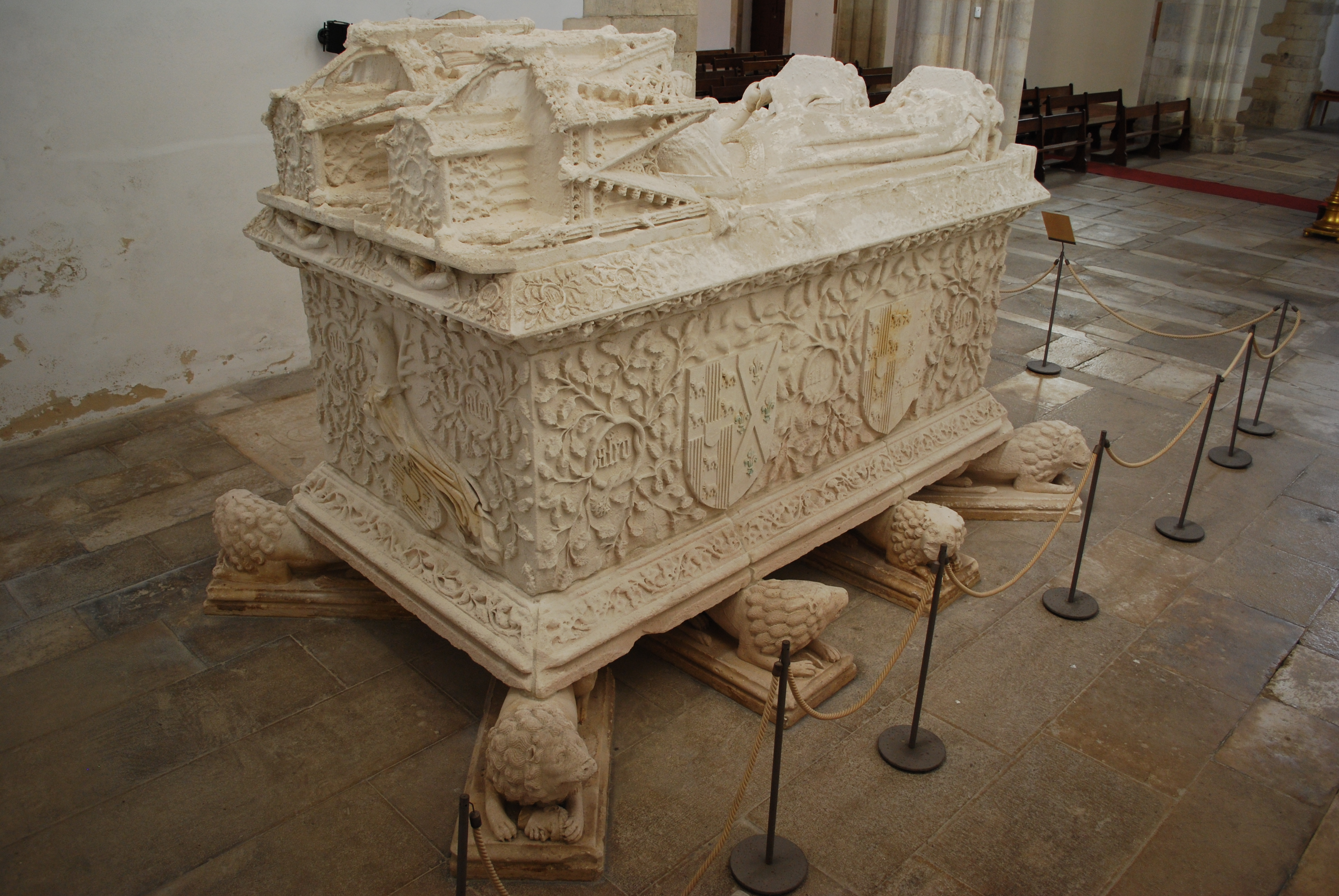
Tomb of Pedro de Menezes, in the Igreja da Graça in Santarém.

Pedro de Menezes was originally buried in the cathedral of Ceuta (a converted mosque), but his remains were later translated by his daughter to the Augustinian monastery church of Igreja da Graça in Santarém, Portugal. His remains are still found there, in an effigy tomb alongside his third wife, Brites Coutinho. The Menezes tomb is decorated with carved wild olive tree branches, and repeatedly embossed with the word aleo, a reference to the gaming stick which Pedro de Menezes made famous. The same motif and slogan, "aleu", is found in the coat of arms of the town of Vila Real, the seat of Pedro de Menezes's fief, it is also found on the coat of arms of the town of Alcoutim, where Pedro's descendants were later made Count's of Alcoutim.
