= São Pedro de Moel =

Beach community in Leiria, Portugal

Coordinates: 39°45′19.00″N 9°1′56.21″W

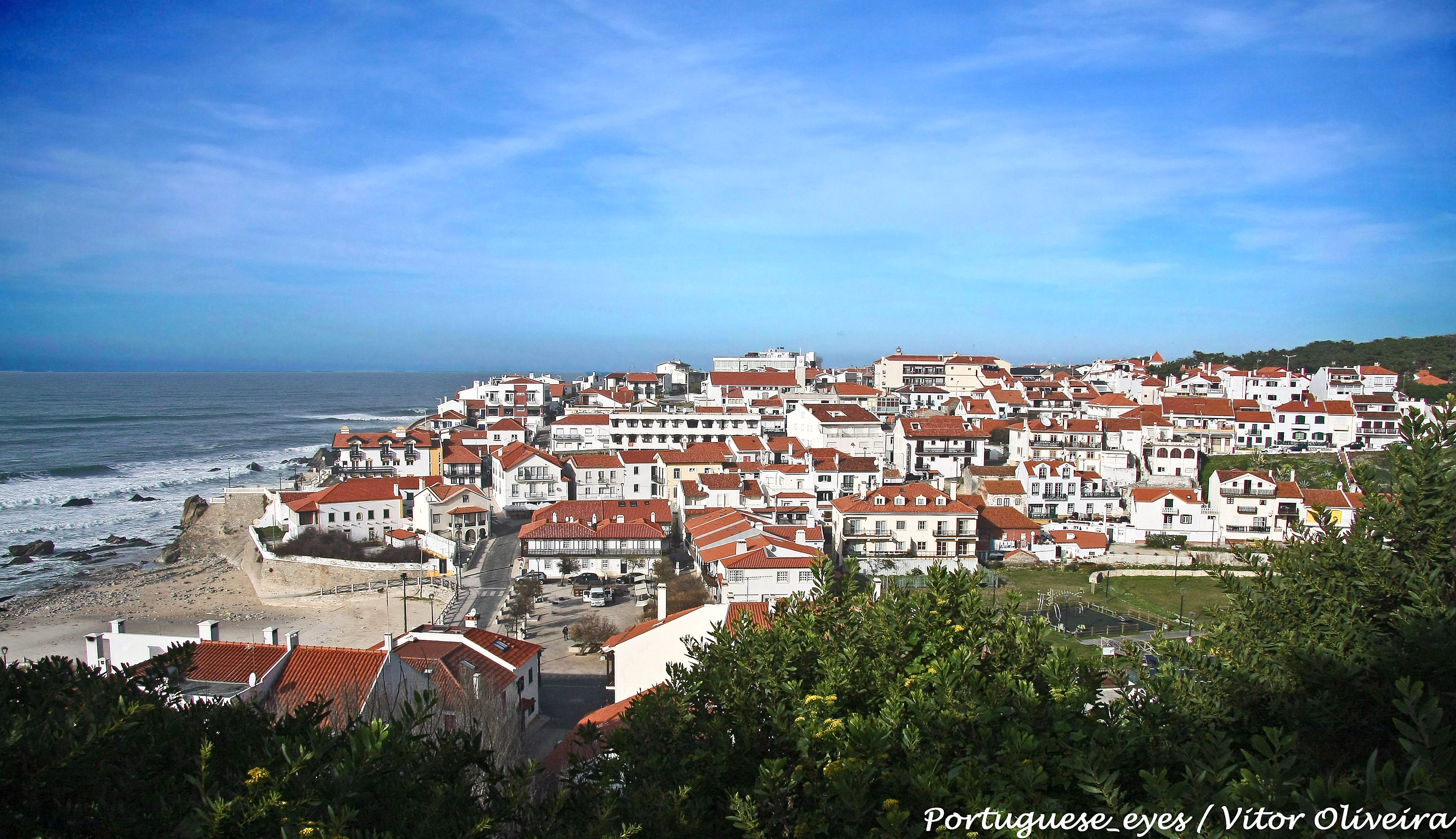
View of the town

São Pedro de Moel is a beach community dependent on the city, freguesia and municipality of Marinha Grande in the District of Leiria, Portugal. According to the 2011 Portuguese Census, it has 389 inhabitants.

It is located within the Pinhal de Leiria, south of the mouth of Ribeira de Moel. It is a seaside village, west of the cities of Marinha Grande and Leiria.

In 1463, Afonso V gave São Pedro de Moel to the Count of Vila Real. The family had a palace in Leiria and several houses in São Pedro de Moel. They lived on this beach until 1641, when the last Marquis of Vila Real and his son, Duke of Caminha, were executed. The widowed Duquesa de Caminha mourned the death of her husband on a rocky outcrop overlooking the ocean, which is named in his honour – Penedo da Saudade – at the top of which there is a lighthouse of the same name. The legend of the Duquesa de Caminha also claims that the rock still resonates with her lament.

Overlooking the beach is the home of the poet Afonso Lopes Vieira which includes a chapel overlooking the ocean and a sun-clock. The house was donated by the poet to the City of Marinha Grande for use as a resort for local children. Nowadays it is also used as a museum.

In the 19th century São Pedro de Moel was the location of a thriving resin factory, using the resources of the abundant local pine forests.

The entire beach was originally part of the Portuguese Mata Nacional do Pinhal do Rei, but in 1923 was reorganised into the Marinha Grande município. It is denoted by a central statue of King Dinis and Queen Santa Isabel.

Points of interest include Praia Velha, Praia da Concha, Penedo da Saudade and its lighthouse, and Ribeira de Moel, all slightly to the north. In the pine forests there are several parks. The Volta dos Sete ("Around the Seven") is a beautiful route running for approximately 7 km, passing sea, beaches, pine forest, parks, fountains and streams.

Storm Kristin caused a catastrophic impact on São Pedro de Moel, which resulted in the Orbitur campsite being closed indefinitely and the Penedo da Sausade Lighthouse being severely damaged.

== Climate ==
São Pedro de Moel has a Mediterranean climate with cool to warm, dry summers and cool, wet winters. The local climate is strongly affected by summer upwelling events. 1974 was one of the coldest years on record: São Pedro de Moel registered its all-time low of October, November and December of that same year.

Climate data for São Pedro de Moel (1991–2020)
Month	Jan	Feb	Mar	Apr	May	Jun	Jul	Aug	Sep	Oct	Nov	Dec	Year
Record high °C (°F)	21.5 (70.7)	23.5 (74.3)	29.2 (84.6)	32.5 (90.5)	36.1 (97.0)	34.0 (93.2)	36.8 (98.2)	38.5 (101.3)	35.5 (95.9)	31.6 (88.9)	25.3 (77.5)	21.5 (70.7)	38.5 (101.3)
Mean daily maximum °C (°F)	14.4 (57.9)	14.9 (58.8)	16.3 (61.3)	17.1 (62.8)	18.8 (65.8)	20.6 (69.1)	21.1 (70.0)	21.6 (70.9)	21.3 (70.3)	20.1 (68.2)	17.0 (62.6)	15.4 (59.7)	18.2 (64.8)
Daily mean °C (°F)	10.7 (51.3)	11.1 (52.0)	12.6 (54.7)	13.8 (56.8)	15.6 (60.1)	17.4 (63.3)	18.2 (64.8)	18.5 (65.3)	17.9 (64.2)	16.5 (61.7)	13.6 (56.5)	11.9 (53.4)	14.8 (58.7)
Mean daily minimum °C (°F)	7.0 (44.6)	7.4 (45.3)	9.0 (48.2)	10.5 (50.9)	12.4 (54.3)	14.2 (57.6)	15.3 (59.5)	15.4 (59.7)	14.5 (58.1)	13.0 (55.4)	10.2 (50.4)	8.3 (46.9)	11.4 (52.6)
Record low °C (°F)	−3.2 (26.2)	−1.7 (28.9)	−1.0 (30.2)	2.0 (35.6)	4.8 (40.6)	6.8 (44.2)	8.5 (47.3)	9.5 (49.1)	7.0 (44.6)	4.5 (40.1)	0.5 (32.9)	−0.5 (31.1)	−3.2 (26.2)
Average precipitation mm (inches)	72.3 (2.85)	51.4 (2.02)	45.6 (1.80)	53.9 (2.12)	42.1 (1.66)	15.5 (0.61)	7.4 (0.29)	11.2 (0.44)	30.4 (1.20)	76.7 (3.02)	85.7 (3.37)	73.0 (2.87)	565.2 (22.25)
Average precipitation days (≥ 1 mm)	10.5	8.1	8.0	8.6	6.5	2.9	1.5	1.9	4.5	9.4	10.8	10.0	82.7
Average relative humidity (%) (at 9:00 UTC)	83	82	80	80	82	84	88	88	87	84	82	83	84
Source: Instituto Português do Mar e da Atmosfera

Climate data for São Pedro de Moel (1971–2000)
Month	Jan	Feb	Mar	Apr	May	Jun	Jul	Aug	Sep	Oct	Nov	Dec	Year
Record high °C (°F)	21.6 (70.9)	23.5 (74.3)	29.2 (84.6)	31.0 (87.8)	32.8 (91.0)	34.5 (94.1)	37.5 (99.5)	38.2 (100.8)	35.2 (95.4)	31.5 (88.7)	25.0 (77.0)	25.0 (77.0)	38.2 (100.8)
Mean daily maximum °C (°F)	14.2 (57.6)	14.7 (58.5)	16.0 (60.8)	16.4 (61.5)	17.7 (63.9)	19.7 (67.5)	20.8 (69.4)	21.1 (70.0)	20.9 (69.6)	19.2 (66.6)	16.9 (62.4)	15.1 (59.2)	17.7 (63.9)
Daily mean °C (°F)	10.4 (50.7)	11.2 (52.2)	12.1 (53.8)	13.1 (55.6)	14.7 (58.5)	16.8 (62.2)	17.8 (64.0)	18.0 (64.4)	17.4 (63.3)	15.7 (60.3)	13.4 (56.1)	11.6 (52.9)	14.4 (57.8)
Mean daily minimum °C (°F)	6.6 (43.9)	7.7 (45.9)	8.4 (47.1)	9.8 (49.6)	11.8 (53.2)	13.8 (56.8)	14.9 (58.8)	14.9 (58.8)	14.0 (57.2)	12.1 (53.8)	9.8 (49.6)	8.1 (46.6)	11.0 (51.8)
Record low °C (°F)	−4.5 (23.9)	−2.0 (28.4)	−0.5 (31.1)	−2.0 (28.4)	3.5 (38.3)	4.0 (39.2)	6.8 (44.2)	6.6 (43.9)	6.4 (43.5)	−1.8 (28.8)	−5.0 (23.0)	−5.5 (22.1)	−5.5 (22.1)
Average precipitation mm (inches)	81.7 (3.22)	70.4 (2.77)	45.9 (1.81)	58.3 (2.30)	52.3 (2.06)	22.3 (0.88)	9.0 (0.35)	10.6 (0.42)	32.2 (1.27)	79.8 (3.14)	91.2 (3.59)	98.2 (3.87)	651.9 (25.68)
Average precipitation days (≥ 0.1 mm)	13.7	13.1	10.4	12.6	10.2	6.2	3.8	3.8	7.2	12.1	13.0	14.5	120.6
Average relative humidity (%) (at 9:00 UTC)	83	82	80	80	82	84	88	88	87	84	82	83	84
Source: Instituto Português do Mar e da Atmosfera

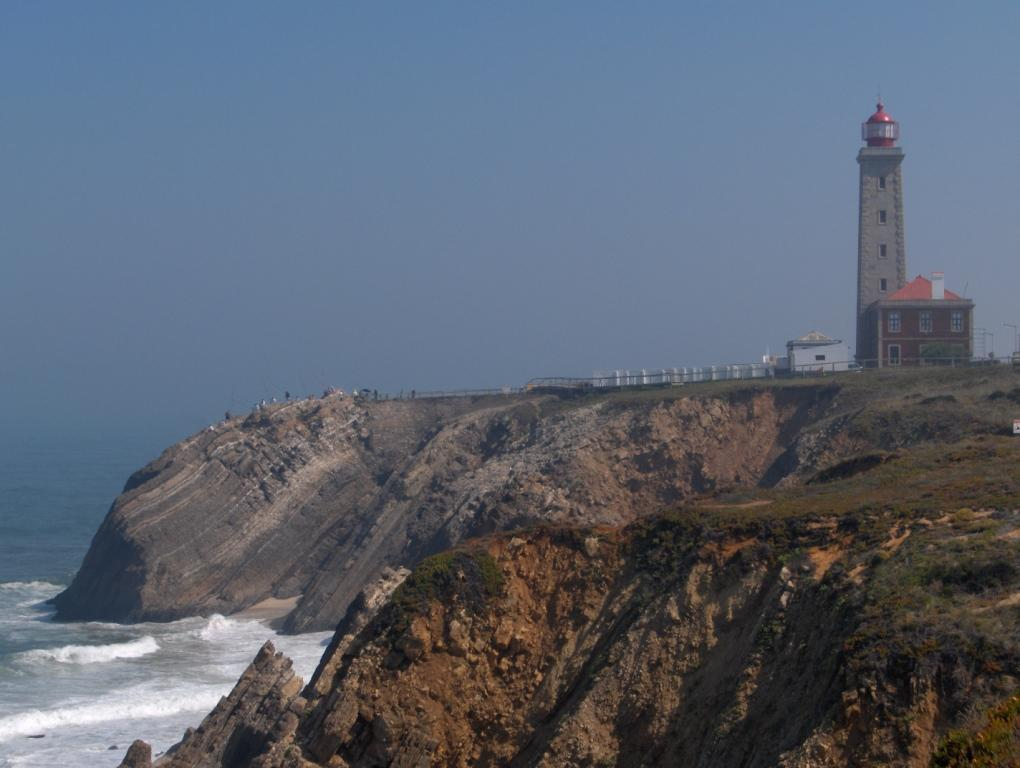
Lighthouse "Penedo da Saudade"

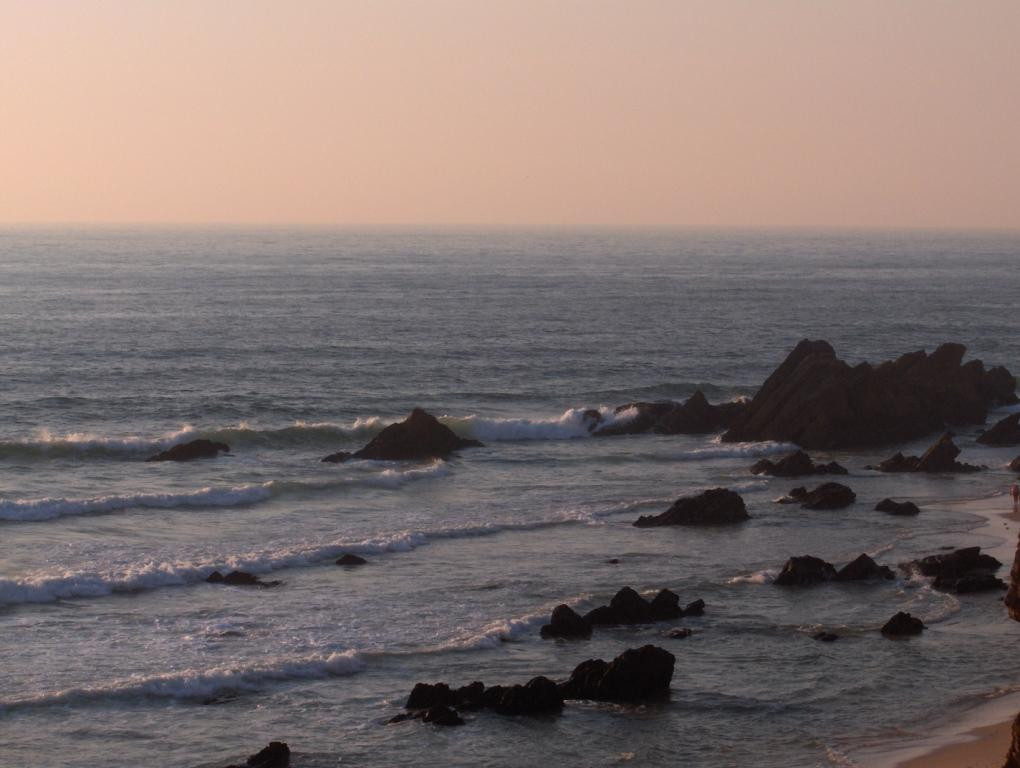
The sea viewed from the coast

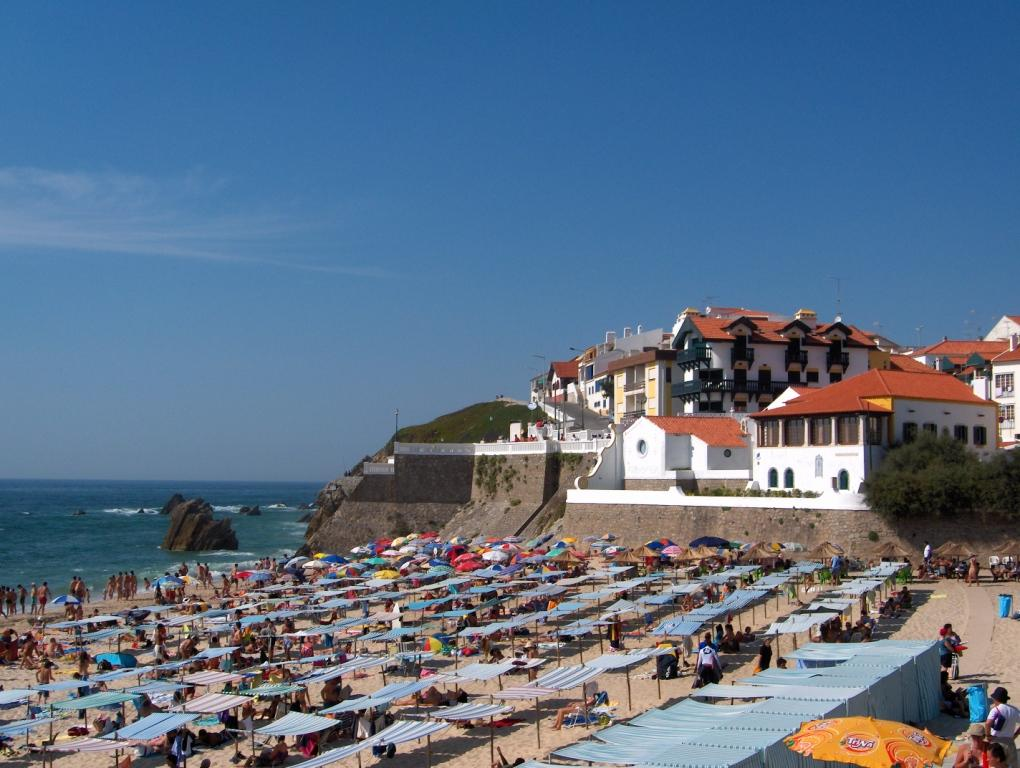
The beach of São Pedro de Moel

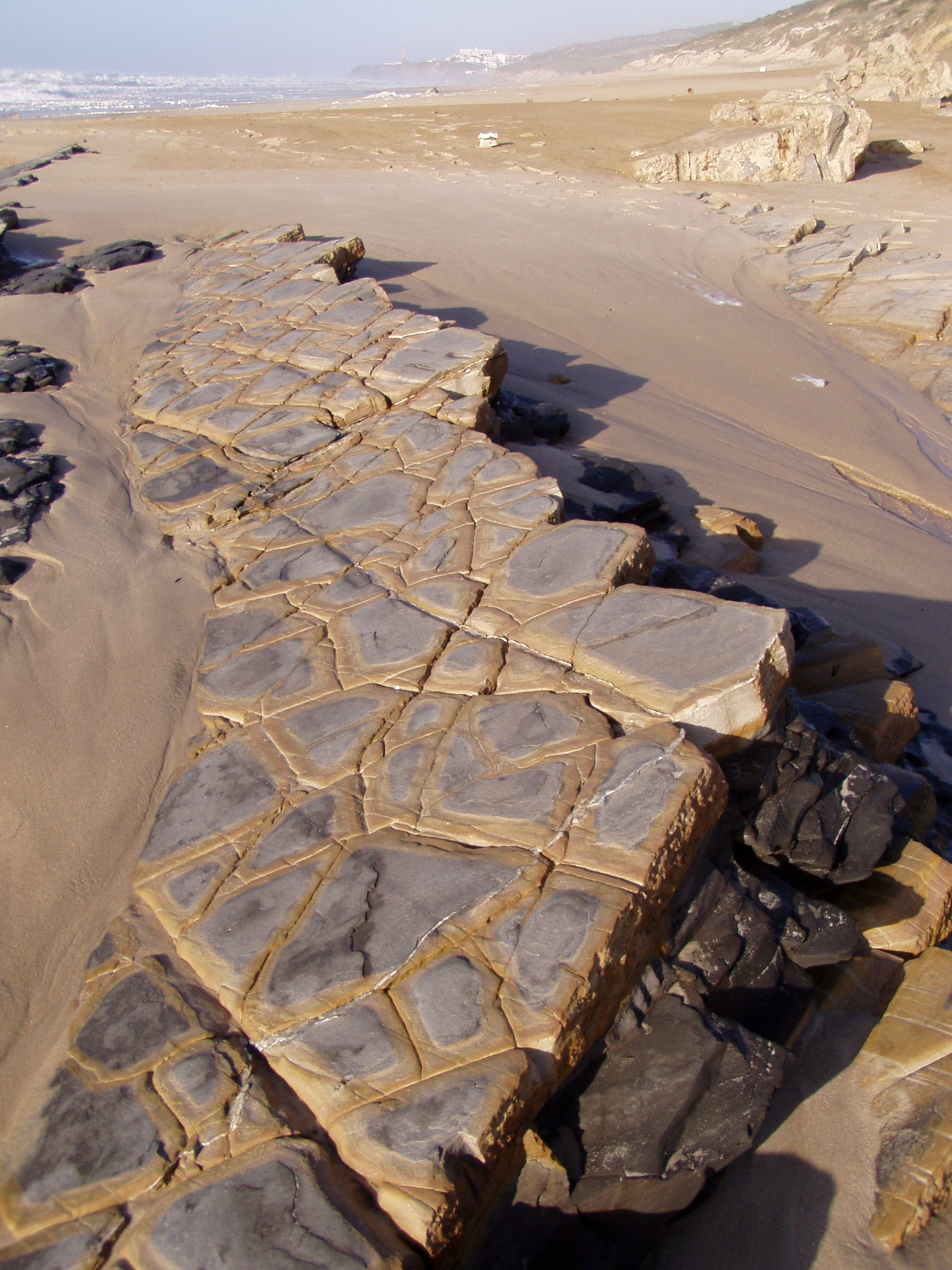
Limestone cropping near São Pedro de Moel beach

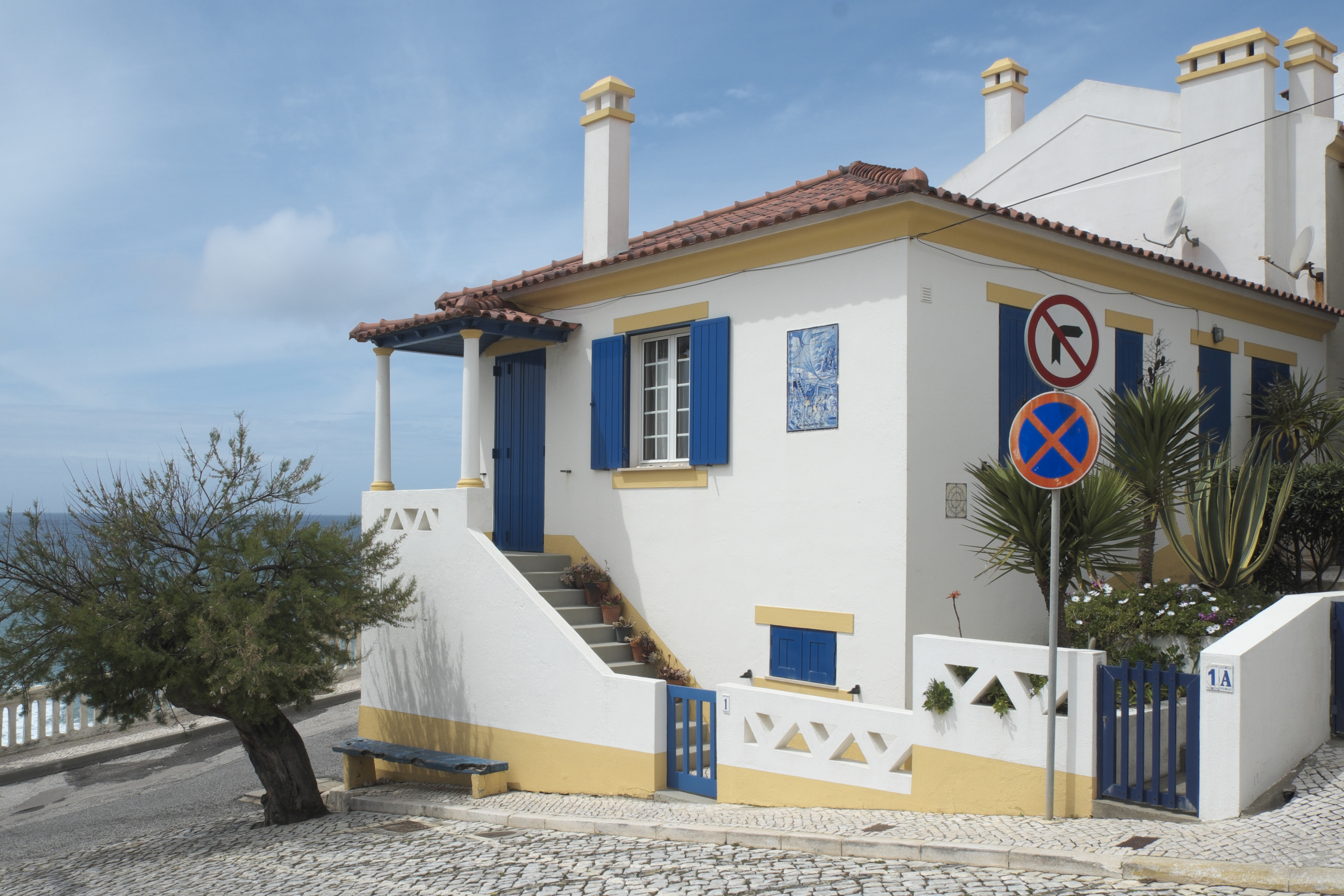

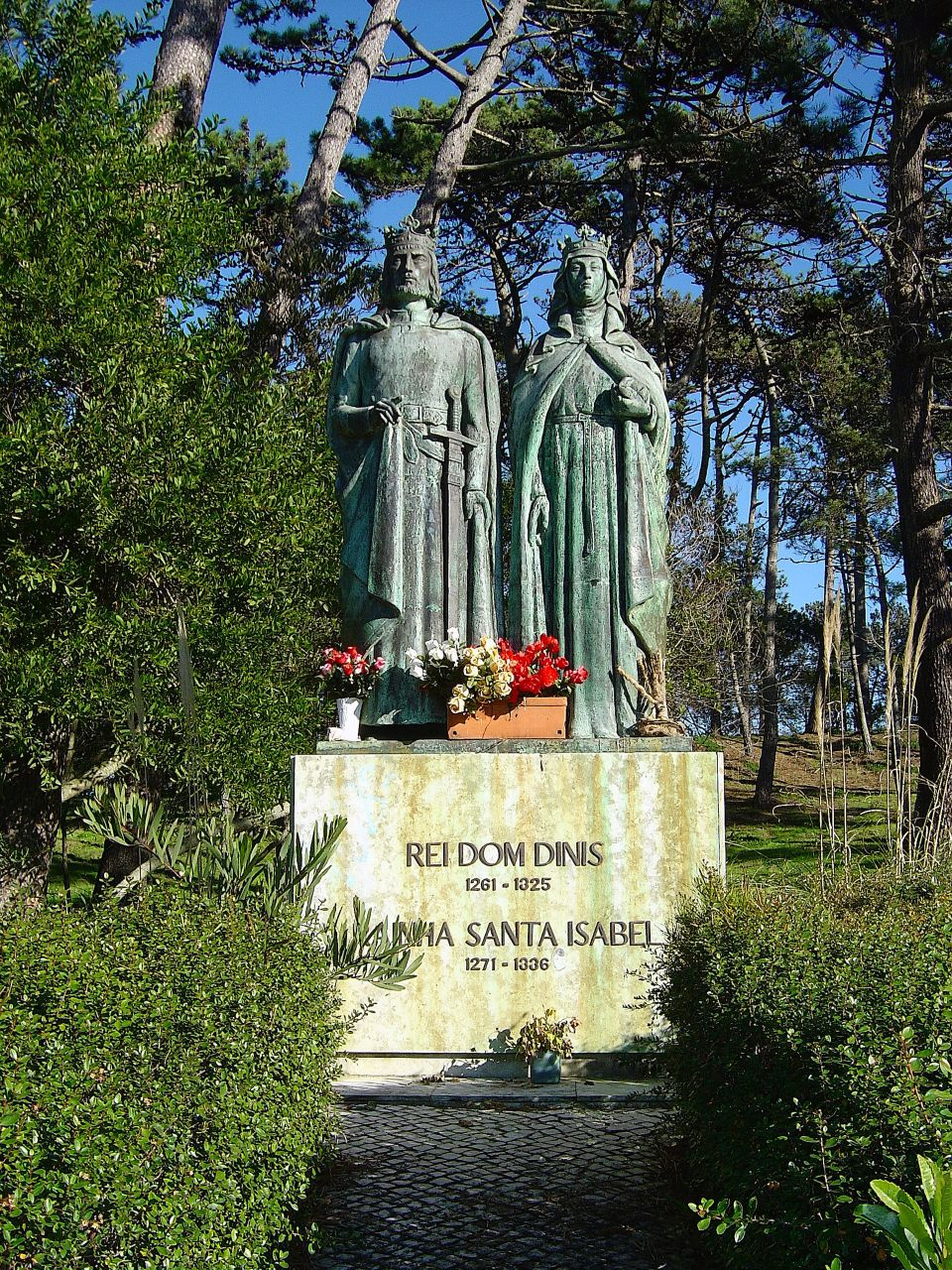
King D. Dinis and Queen Santa Isabel
