= Marquis of Vila Real =

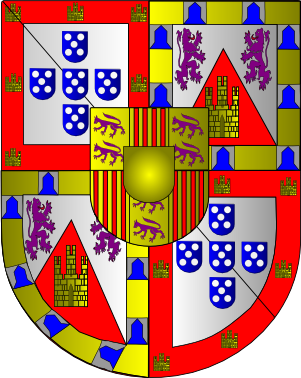
The Coat of Arms of the Marquis of Vila Real.

Marquis of Vila Real (in Portuguese Marquês de Vila Real) was a Portuguese title of nobility created by a royal decree, dated from 1 March 1489, by King John II of Portugal, and granted to Dom Pedro de Menezes, also known as Peter II of Menezes, 3rd Count of Vila Real.

The House of Vila Real was the most powerful aristocratic House in Portugal, during the 16th and 17th centuries, after the Dukes of Braganza and the Dukes of Aveiro.

To reward their support during the 1580 Portuguese succession crisis, the Spanish Habsburgs granted this House new titles (Duke of Vila Real and Duke of Caminha). However, all this wealth was confiscated and Miguel Luís II, 2nd Duke of Caminha, was executed for high treason on the order of King John IV of Portugal for supporting the right of the Spanish Habsburg Kings to the Portuguese throne after the revolution of 1640.

== List of marquesses of Vila Real ==
1. Pedro de Menezes, 1st Marquis of Vila Real (1425–1499), also known as Peter II of Menezes, 3rd Count of Vila Real and 7th Count of Ourém;
2. Fernando de Menezes, 2nd Marquis of Vila Real (1463- ? ), also known as Ferdinand II of Menezes, 4th Count of Vila Real;
3. Pedro de Menezes, 3rd Marquis of Vila Real (1486- ? ), also known as Peter III of Meneses, 5th Count of Vila Real;
4. Miguel de Menezes, 4th Marquis of Vila Real (1520- ? ), also known as Michael I of Menezes, 6th Count of Vila Real;
5. Manuel de Meneses, 5th Marquis of Vila Real (1530- ? ), also known as Manuel of Menezes, 1st Duke of Vila Real and 7th Count of Vila Real;
6. Miguel Luís, 6th Marquis of Vila Real (1565–1637), also known as Michael II of Menezes, 1st Duke of Caminha and 8th Count of Vila Real;
7. Luís de Noronha e Meneses, 7th Marquis of Vila Real (1570–1641), also known as Louis of Menezes, 9th Count of Vila Real.

== Genealogical summary ==
The House of Vila Real had their origins in Dom Pedro de Menezes, also known as Peter I of Menezes, 1st Count of Vila Real, 2nd Count of Viana (do Alentejo) and 1st Governor of Ceuta after the Portuguese conquest, in 1415. However the Counts, later Marquesses, have royal ancestry (both Portuguese and Spanish), once they descended from King Ferdinand I of Portugal and from King Henry II of Castile.

K.= King; C.= Count/Countess; M.= Marquess	Peter I (1320–1367); K.of Portugal
Henry II (1333–1379); K.of Castile	Ferdinand I (1345–1383); K.of Portugal	John I (1357–1433); K.of Portugal
PETER I of Menezes (1350–1437); 1st.C.of Vila Real (1424)	Alphonso Enriquez (1350–1395); C.of Noreña y Gijón (in Castile)	Isabel of Portugal (1364–1435)	Duarte I (1391–1438); K.of Portugal
BEATRICE of Menezes (1400-c. 1460); 2nd.C.of Vila Real	FERDINAND I of Noronha (1380–1460); 2nd.C.of Vila Real	Royal House of Portugal
PETER II of Menezes (1425–1499); 3rd.C.of Vila Real; 1st.M.of Vila Real
House of Vila Real

== Marquises of Villa Real (Spanish title) ==
When the 7th Marquis of Vila Real, along with his son the Duke of Caminha, was executed in Portugal for high treason in 1641, his daughter, Beatrice of Menezes, married to the Spanish Count of Medellin, remained in Spain.

To reward her fidelity towards the Spanish Habsburgs, King Philip IV of Spain gave her, 23 March 1660, the title of Marquise of Villa Real (Spanish spelling) as a Spanish title, included today among the titles of the House of Medinaceli.

Beatrice of Menezes never returned to her homeland and this title was never recognized in Portugal.

=== Marquises of Villa Real (1660-) ===
- Beatriz de Meneses, 1st Marquise of Villa Real (1614–1668)
- Pedro Damián Portocarrero, 9th Count of Medellín and 2nd Marquis of Villa Real (1640–1704), eldest son of the 1st Marquise.
- Luisa Feliciana Portocarrero, 10th Countess of Medellín and 3rd Marquise of Villa Real (1641–1705), elder surviving daughter of the 1st Marquise.
- Guillén Ramón de Moncada, 6th Marquis of Aitona and 4th Marquis of Villa Real (1671–1727), eldest son of the 3rd Marquis.
- María Teresa de Moncada, 7th Marquise of Aitona and 5th Marquise of Villa Real (1707–1756), eldest daughter of the 4th Marquis.
- Pedro de Alcántara Fernández de Córdoba, 12th Duke of Medinaceli and 6th Marquis of Villa Real (1730–1789), eldest son of the 5th Marquise.
- Luis Fernández de Córdoba, 13th Duke of Medinaceli and 7th Marquis of Villa Real (1749–1806), eldest son of the 6th Marquis.
- Luis Fernández de Córdoba, 14th Duke of Medinaceli and 8th Marquis of Villa Real (1780–1840), eldest son of the 7th Marquis.
- Luis Fernández de Córdoba, 15th Duke of Medinaceli and 9th Marquis of Villa Real (1813–1873), elder son of the 8th Marquis.
- Luis Fernández de Córdoba, 16th Duke of Medinaceli and 10th Marquis of Villa Real (1851–1879), elder son of the 9th Marquis.
- Luis Fernández de Córdoba, 17th Duke of Medinaceli and 11th Marquis of Villa Real (1880–1956), elder son of the 10th Marquis.
- Victoria Eugenia Fernández de Córdoba, 18th Duchess of Medinaceli and 12th Marquise of Villa Real (1917–2013), eldest daughter of the 11th Marquis.
- Princess Victoria of Hohenlohe-Langenburg, 20th Duchess of Medinaceli, Current Marchioness of Villa Real (b.1997)

== Other titles ==
- Count of Vila Real, in 1424 by a royal decree of King John I of Portugal;
- Count of Valença, in 1464 by a royal decree of King Afonso V of Portugal;
- Count of Alcoutim, in 1496 by a royal decree of King John II of Portugal;
- Duke of Vila Real, in 1585 by a royal decree of King Philip I of Portugal (Philip II of Spain);
- Duke of Caminha, in 1620 by a royal decree of King Philip III of Portugal (Philip IV of Spain).

== See also ==
- Duke of Vila Real
- Duke of Caminha
- Dukedoms in Portugal
- List of marquisates in Portugal
- List of countships in Portugal

== Bibliography ==
”Nobreza de Portugal e do Brasil" – Vol. III, pages 523/528. Published by Zairol Lda., Lisbon 1989.
