= Avé de Fátima =

Roman Catholic Marian hymn

Avé de Fátima (English: Fátima Ave), also known as the Fátima Hymn, is a popular Roman Catholic Marian hymn. It is sung in honour of Our Lady of Fátima, a Catholic title of the Blessed Virgin Mary based on the Marian apparitions reported in 1917 by three shepherd children at Cova da Iria, in Fátima, Portugal.

The hymn was written in August 1929 by Portuguese poet Afonso Lopes Vieira and it was first published, anonymously ("by a Servite"), in the 13 September 1929 issue of the religious periodical Voz da Fátima. Lopes Vieira had witnessed what he later identified as the Miracle of the Sun on 13 October 1917 from the balcony of his house in São Pedro de Moel (about 50 kilometers northwest of Fátima), alongside his wife and mother-in-law. The month he wrote the hymn, August, 1929, coincides with the completion of an oratory dedicated to Our Lady of Fátima had Lopes Vieira in his house. The original version of the Avé de Fátima, sent to José Alves Correia da Silva, the Bishop of Leiria, was set to a tune by Francisco de Lacerda.

== Versions ==
There are several versions of the hymn used in different parts of the world; the adaptations in different languages are set to the same tune, theme, and refrain. What follows are two English-language versions:

European English	American English
The thirteenth of May In the Cova d'Iria Appeared, oh so brilliant, The Virgin Maria Ave, Ave, Ave Maria! Ave, Ave, Ave Maria! The Virgin Maria Encircled with light, Our own dearest Mother And heaven's delight. Ave, Ave, Ave Maria! Ave, Ave, Ave Maria! To three little shepherds Our Lady appeared The light of Her grace To Her Son souls endeared Ave, Ave, Ave Maria! Ave, Ave, Ave Maria! With war and its evils The whole world was seething And countless of thousands Were mourning and weeping. Ave, Ave, Ave Maria! Ave, Ave, Ave Maria! To save all poor souls Who had wandered astray, With words of sweet comfort She asked us to pray. Ave, Ave, Ave Maria! Ave, Ave, Ave Maria! By honouring Mary And loving Her Son The peace of the world Will most surely be won. Ave, Ave, Ave Maria! Ave, Ave, Ave Maria!	In Fatima's Cove On the thirteenth of May The Virgin Maria Appeared at midday Ave, Ave, Ave Maria! Ave, Ave, Ave Maria! The Virgin Maria Surrounded by light God's mother is ours For She gives us this sight. Ave, Ave, Ave Maria! Ave, Ave, Ave Maria! The world was then suffering From war, plague and strife, And Portugal mourned For her great loss of life. Ave, Ave, Ave Maria! Ave, Ave, Ave Maria! To three shepherd children The Virgin then spoke A message so hopeful With peace for all folk Ave, Ave, Ave Maria! Ave, Ave, Ave Maria! With sweet Mother's pleading She asked us to pray. Do penance, be modest, The Rosary each day. Ave, Ave, Ave Maria! Ave, Ave, Ave Maria! All Portugal heard What God's Mother did say, Converted, it sings of That Queen to this day. Ave, Ave, Ave Maria! Ave, Ave, Ave Maria! We all must remember Our Lady's request Do all that She asks for, Obey Her behests. Ave, Ave, Ave Maria! Ave, Ave, Ave Maria!
