= João Afonso Telo, 4th Count of Barcelos =

Portuguese nobleman

João Afonso Telo
- 1st count of Ourém; 4th count of Barcelos
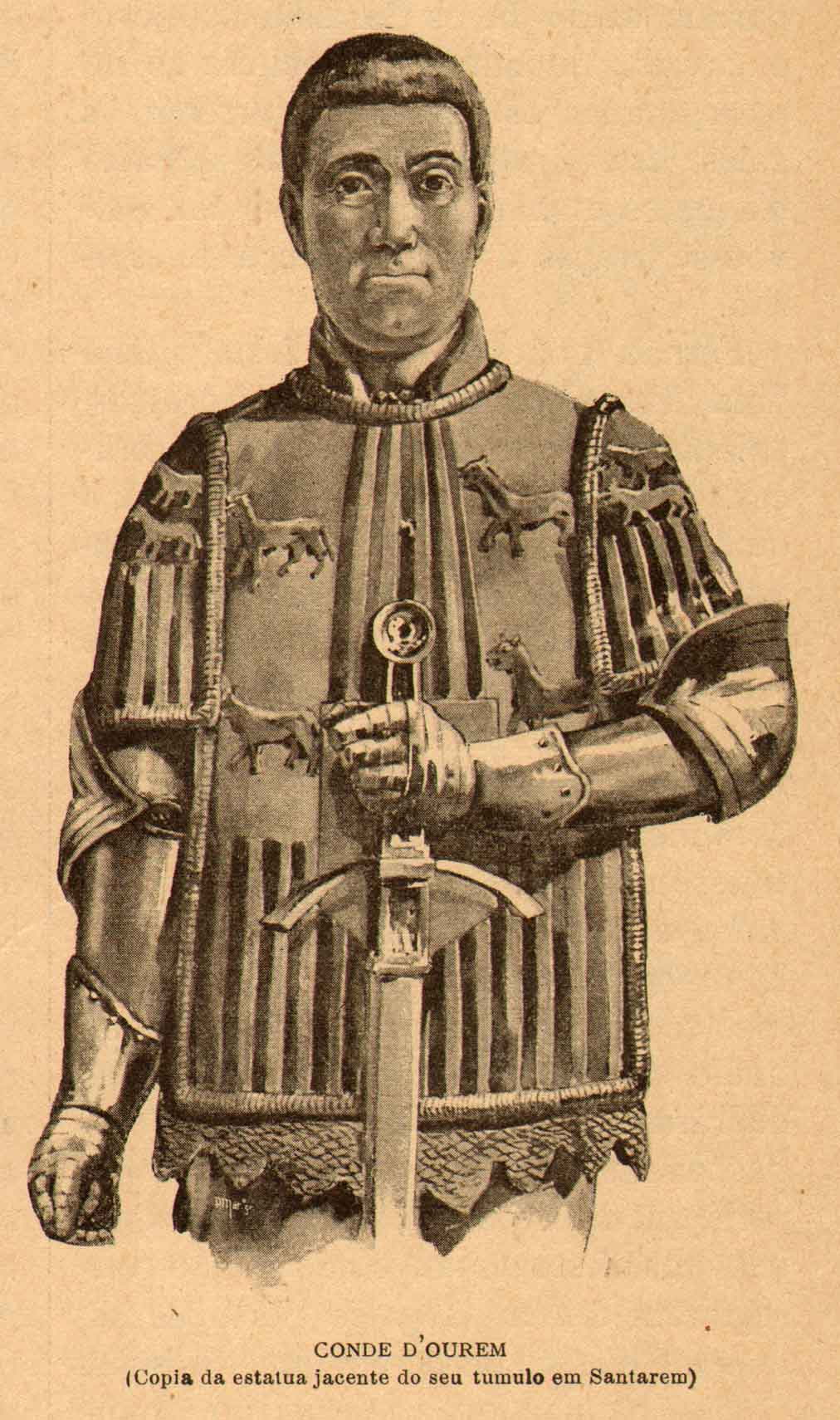
- Born: 14th century Kingdom of Portugal
- Died: 1381; Kingdom of Portugal
- Buried: Graça Church

João Afonso Telo de Menezes (died 1381) was a Portuguese nobleman, 1st Count of Ourém and 4th Count of Barcelos.

== Life ==
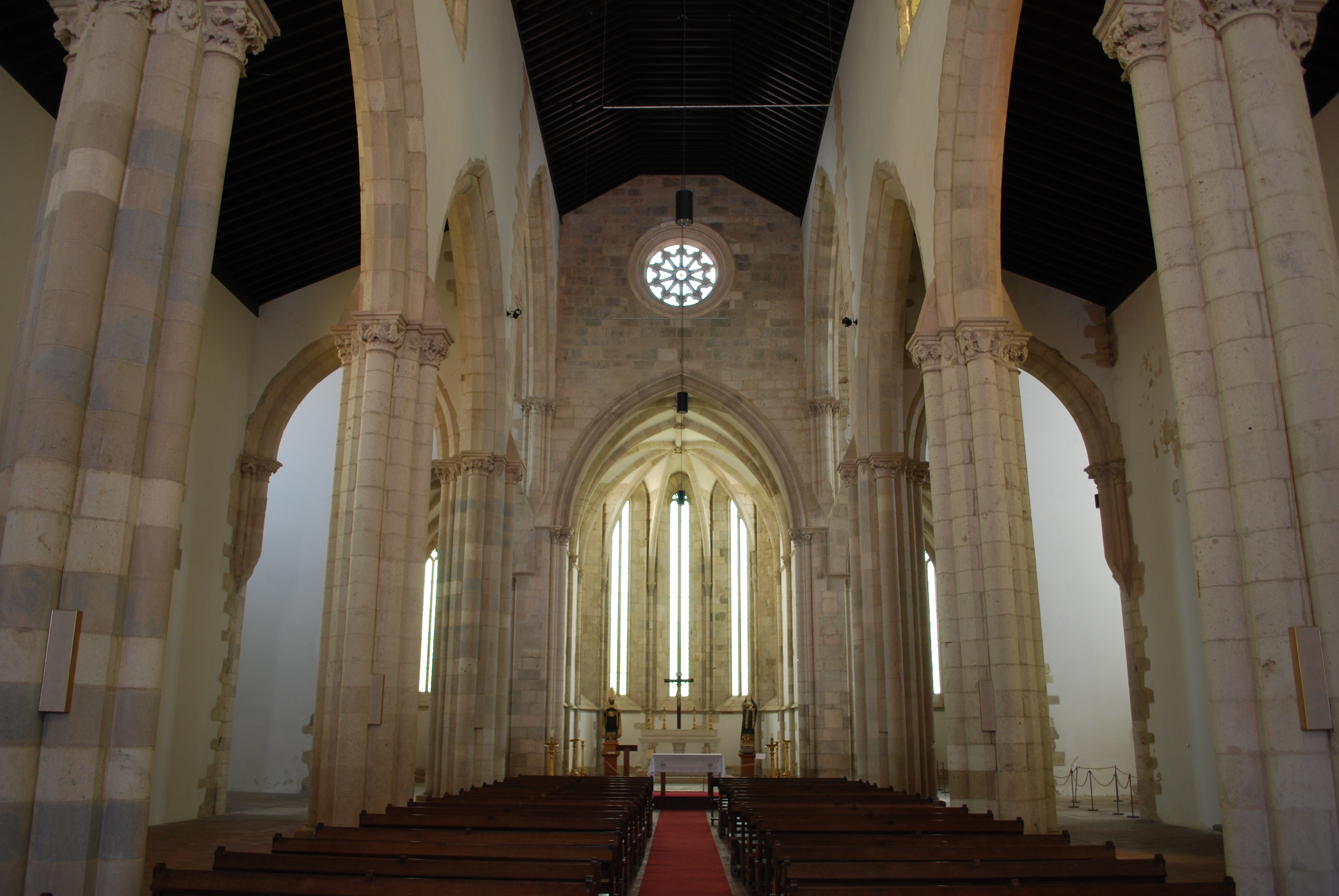
Interior of Graça Church in Santarém where João Afonso Telo and his wife were buried.

João Afonso Telo was the second son of Afonso Martins Telo "Raposo" and Berengária Lourenço de Valadares, daughter of Lourenço Soares de Valadares — advisor to kings Afonso III and Denis of Portugal — and his second wife Sancha Nunes de Chacim. Berengária was also the sister of Aldonça Lourenço de Valadares, the mother of Inés de Castro.

João Afonso Telo was a trusted advisor of King Pedro I and his son King Fernando I of Portugal, married to his niece, Leonor Teles. He was also the alferes-mor of King Pedro I who on 10 October 1357 made him Count of Barcelos and appears with the title of Count of Ourém in December 1371 after King Fernando I had given him the town of Ourém in January of the previous year but without the title of count at that time.

He died during the Christmas holidays in 1381 and was buried at the Graça Church in Santarém, which he and his wife, who was still alive in 1404 and was subsequently buried next to her husband, had founded.

== Marriage and issue ==
He was married to Guiomar Lopes Pacheco, daughter of Lopo Fernandes Pacheco and Maria Rodríguez de Villalobos. They were the parents of:

- Afonso Telo de Meneses, 5th Count of Barcelos, by charter dated 20 March 1372, but since he died before his father and without having any issue, the title again reverted to his father.
- João Afonso Telo (died in 1384), 1st Count of Viana do Alentejo in March 1373, while his father was still alive. He did not inherit the titles of Count of Barcelos or Ourém since the former title was given to João Afonso Telo and the latter one to Juan Fernández Andeiro. He was killed by his vassals in 1384 because he had supported the cause of the King John I of Castile, pretender to the throne of Portugal during the political crisis of 1383–1385. He and his wife, Maior de Portocarrero, daughter of João Rodrigues de Portocarrero, were the parents of Pedro de Menezes, 1st Count of Vila Real and the 2nd Count of Viana do Alentejo.
- Leonor de Meneses, married to Pedro de Castro, Lord of Cadaval and son of Álvaro Pires de Castro.

== Bibliography ==
- Braamcamp Freire, Anselmo (1921). Livro primeiro dos Brasões de Sintra (in Portuguese). Coimbra: Imprensa da Universidade. OCLC 794223590.
- Sotto Mayor Pizarro, José Augusto (1997). Linhagens Medievais Portuguesas: Genealogias e Estratégias (1279-1325 (in Portuguese). Vol. I and II. Oporto: Doctorate thesis, author’s edition. hdl:10216/18023.|
- Sotto Mayor Pizarro, José Augusto P. (1987). Os Patronos do Mosteiro de Grijo: Evolução e Estrutura da Familia Nobre Séculos XI a XIV (in Portuguese). Oporto.
