= Count of Mangualde =

Noble title in the Kingdom of Portugal

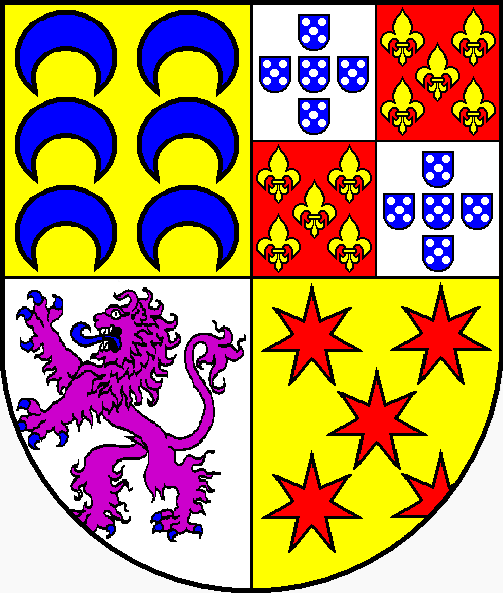
- Creation date: 23 April 1891 (viscountcy); 17 May 1905 (elevation to countship); 17 May 1906 (verification of the second life)
- Created by: Carlos I of Portugal
- First holder: Dom Francisco de Almeida Cardoso e Albuquerque
- Last holder: Dom Fernando de Almeida Cardoso de Albuquerque (monarchy abolished)
- Present holder: Dona Teresa Margarida Gomez de Sousa Botelho de Albuquerque (claimant)
- Remainder to: Two lives, with honours of Grandeza
- Extinction date: 1910 (monarchy abolished)
- Seats: House of the Counts of Mangualde, Mangualde; Mateus Palace, Vila Real

Count of Mangualde (Portuguese: Conde de Mangualde) was a Portuguese noble title granted for two lives, with honours of Grandeza, by royal decree of 17 May 1905 of King Carlos I of Portugal, in favour of Dom Francisco de Almeida Cardoso e Albuquerque, who had previously been created Viscount of Mangualde, a title of which he was the only holder. The second life was verified in 1906 in favour of his son, Fernando de Almeida Cardoso de Albuquerque.

== History ==
=== Creation of the title ===
The title was created in favour of Francisco de Almeida Cardoso e Albuquerque (1841–1921), who served as civil governor of several districts, including Viseu, as president of the municipality of Mangualde, as director-general of National Properties (Próprios Nacionais), as a deputy, and as a member of the Council of His Most Faithful Majesty. He was the fourth son of Tiago da Silva Albuquerque e Amaral de Almeida Cardoso, 5th administrator of the entailed estate of Nabais, and of Maria Cândida da Paixão Pinto Cardoso, lady of the House of Mesquitela; his father was also lord of the House and entailed estates of Mangualde.

King Carlos I granted him the title of Viscount of Mangualde by decree of 23 April 1891 and, by decree of 17 May 1905, raised him to count, with honours of Grandeza and for two lives. The second life was verified by decree of 17 May 1906, during the lifetime of the first holder, in favour of his only son, Fernando de Almeida Cardoso de Albuquerque (1874–1932), an artillery officer.

In 1900, Fernando married Maria Teresa de Sousa Botelho e Melo (1871–1947). As her only brother had no legitimate issue, she became the representative of the titles of Count of Vila Real and Count of Melo, and was styled 4th Countess of Vila Real and 3rd Countess of Melo.

=== House of the Counts of Mangualde ===
Fernando de Almeida Cardoso de Albuquerque, 2nd Count of Mangualde, acquired the manor house in Mangualde from the heirs of Bento José do Amaral and made it the family's residence.

Built in the 18th century, the house has a main façade with curved-lintel windows and a doorway crowned by a semicircular pediment bearing the arms of the Amaral and Saraiva families. The rear façade opens onto a Baroque-style garden with beds of ornamental plants, mazes and a water basin.

The building has been classified as a Property of Municipal Interest (Imóvel de Interesse Municipal) since 2010. It was later converted into tourist accommodation.

=== Connection to the House of Mateus ===
Francisco de Sousa Botelho de Albuquerque (1909–1973), only son of the 2nd Count and a civil engineer who graduated from the Instituto Superior Técnico, inherited the Mateus Palace, near Vila Real. From 1943 he devoted himself to its restoration together with his mother. The works he promoted included the Cedar Tunnel, the Water Garden and the Water Mirror, the last designed by Gonçalo Ribeiro Telles. He also opened the house's museum to the public in 1961. On 3 December 1970, he established the Casa de Mateus Foundation (Fundação da Casa de Mateus). He donated to it the house, the chapel, the gardens, the surrounding land, and the documentary and museum collections. The foundation was recognised as a public-utility institution in 1971. He died in Lisbon on 8 January 1973.

He was succeeded by his eldest son, Fernando de Sousa Botelho de Albuquerque (1941–2022). Fernando was a chemical engineer who graduated from the Instituto Superior Técnico, and he led the foundation as executive director from 1973 until his death. Under his leadership, the foundation created the following:

- the "Repensar Portugal" (Rethinking Portugal) seminars, in 1978;
- the International Music Meetings of the Casa de Mateus;
- the D. Dinis Prize, in 1980;
- the Casa de Mateus International Institute, in 1986;
- the Artists' Residency, in 1998.

In 2021, the President of Portugal, Marcelo Rebelo de Sousa, awarded him the Grand Cross of the Order of Prince Henry. He died on 14 January 2022. The President sent his condolences to the family, and the foundation published a note of mourning.

Leadership of the foundation then passed to his daughter, Teresa Margarida Gomez de Sousa Botelho de Albuquerque. She has continued the work of preserving the biodiversity of the estate, which covers about 30 hectares. The palace has been classified as a National Monument since 1910 and received about 113,000 visitors in 2024. The foundation marked its 55th anniversary in December 2025.

== Arms ==
The arms of the Counts of Mangualde are a quartered shield:

- first quarter: the arms of the Amaral family;
- second quarter: the arms of the Albuquerque family;
- third quarter: the arms of the Silva family;
- fourth quarter: the arms of the Fonseca family.

As a mark of difference, they bear a brica gules charged with a barb argent. The arms were granted by letters of 20 May 1789 to Bernardo António Albuquerque da Silva, a male-line ancestor of the counts. From that date, the family held the status of fidalgos de cota de armas (nobles entitled to coat armour).

== Viscounts of Mangualde (1891) ==
#	Name	Dates	Titles	Notes	Ref.
1	Francisco de Almeida Cardoso e Albuquerque	1841–1921	1st Viscount of Mangualde	Only holder of the viscountcy; raised to count on 17 May 1905.	

== Counts of Mangualde (1905) ==
#	Name	Dates	Titles	Notes	Ref.
1	Francisco de Almeida Cardoso e Albuquerque	1841–1921	1st Viscount and 1st Count of Mangualde	Countship granted for two lives, with honours of Grandeza, by decree of 17 May 1905.	
2	Fernando de Almeida Cardoso de Albuquerque	1874–1932	2nd Count of Mangualde	Son of the above. Title verified in the second life by decree of 17 May 1906. Married Maria Teresa de Sousa Botelho e Melo, 4th Countess of Vila Real and 3rd Countess of Melo. Acquired the family house in Mangualde.	

== Claimants under the Republic ==
After the establishment of the Republic in 1910, the State ceased to grant noble titles. Since then, the following members of the family have claimed the representation of the title:

#	Name	Dates	Titles claimed	Notes	Ref.
3	Francisco de Sousa Botelho de Albuquerque	1909–1973	3rd Count of Mangualde	Son of the above. Also 5th Count of Vila Real and 4th Count of Melo. Founder of the Casa de Mateus Foundation (1970).	
4	Fernando de Sousa Botelho de Albuquerque	1941–2022	4th Count of Mangualde	Son of the above. Also 6th Count of Vila Real and 5th Count of Melo. Executive director of the Casa de Mateus Foundation (1973–2022).	
5	Teresa Margarida Gomez de Sousa Botelho de Albuquerque	b. 1966	5th Countess of Mangualde	Daughter of the above. Executive director of the Casa de Mateus Foundation since 2022.	

== Gallery ==
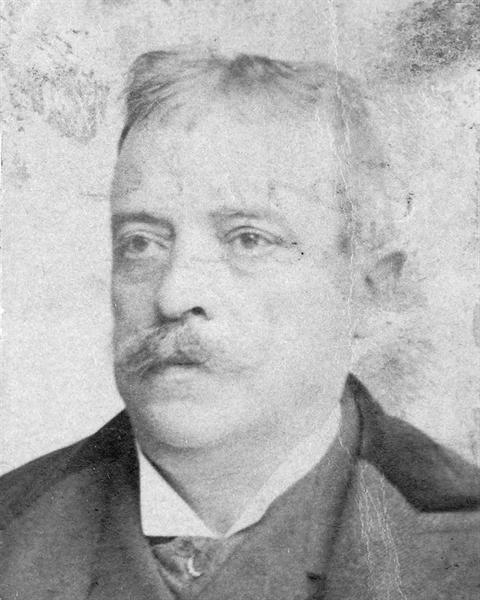
Francisco de Almeida Cardoso e Albuquerque, 1st Count of Mangualde

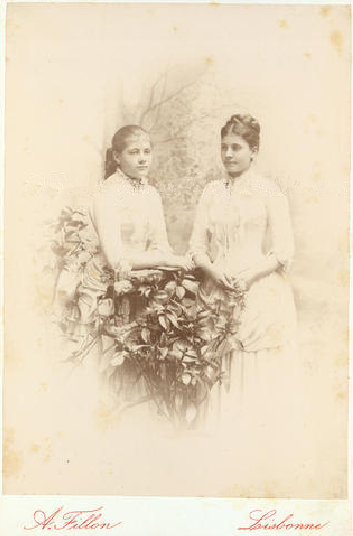
Maria Teresa de Sousa Botelho e Melo, Countess of Mangualde by marriage to the 2nd Count, and her sister, Maria dos Prazeres de Sousa Botelho Mourão e Vasconcelos (Casa de Mateus Archive)

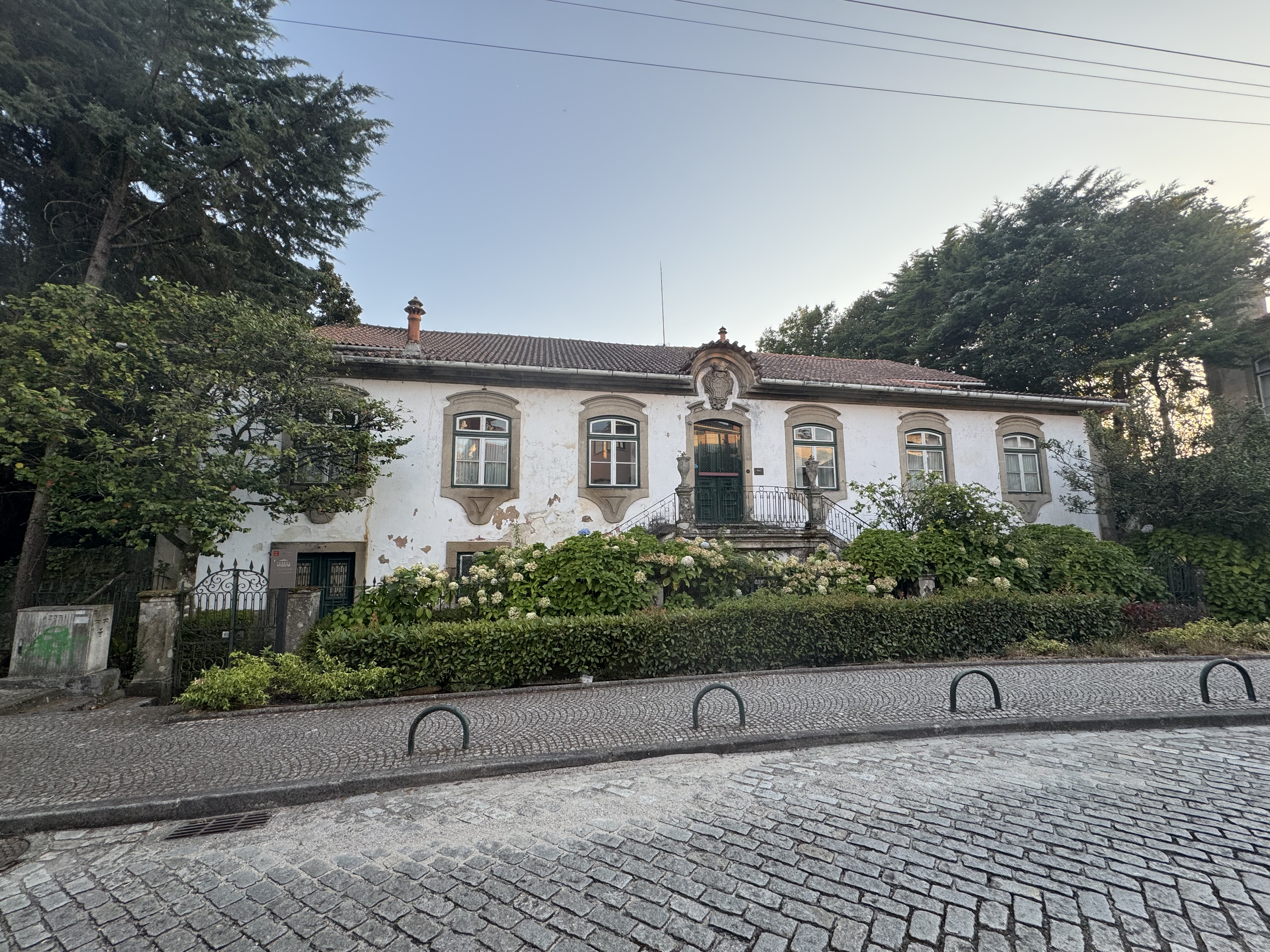
House of the Counts of Mangualde, in Mangualde (August 2025)

== Notes ==
- This article was originally translated, in whole or in part, from the Portuguese Wikipedia article titled "Conde de Mangualde".
