= List of governors of Ceuta =

Current flag of Ceuta

Current coat of arms of Ceuta

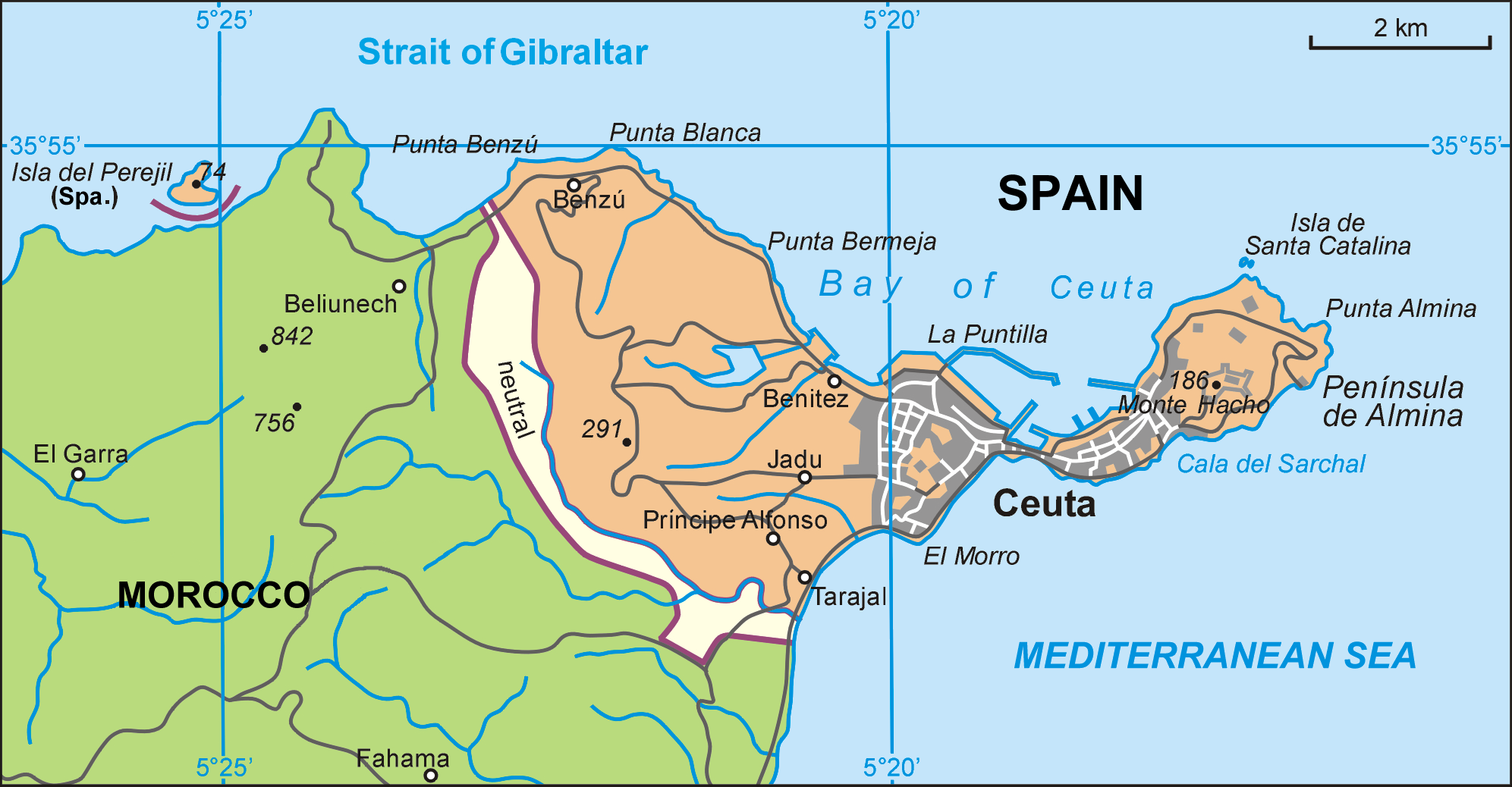
Map of Ceuta

The following is a list of governors and other local administrators of the city of Ceuta, which was first a Portuguese and subsequently a Spanish exclave in North Africa. The list encompasses the period from 1415 until 1995.

== List ==
=== Portuguese Captains-general ===
- 1415–1424: Pedro de Meneses, conde de Vila Real
- 1424–1425: Rui Gomes da Silva
- 1425–1430: Pedro de Meneses, conde de Vila Real
- 1430–1434: Duarte de Meneses, conde de Viana (interim)
- 1434–1437: Pedro de Meneses, conde de Vila Real
- 1437–1438: Duarte de Meneses, conde de Viana (interim)
- 1438–1445: Fernão de Noronha, conde de Vila Real
- 1445–1447: António Pacheco (interim)
- 1447–1448: Fernão de Portugal, duque de Bragança
- 1448 : António Pacheco (interim)
- 1448–1450: Fernão de Portugal, duque de Bragança
- 1450–1460: Sancho de Noronha, conde de Odemira
- 1461–1462: Pedro de Meneses, conde de Vila Real
- 1462–1463: Pedro de Albuquerque (interim)
- 1463–1464: Pedro de Meneses, conde de Vila Real
- 1464–1479: João Rodrigues de Vasconcelos Ribeiro
- 1479–1481: Rui Mendes de Vasconcelos Ribeiro
- 1481–1487: João de Noronha, senhor de Sortelha
- 1487–1491: António de Noronha, conde de Linhares
- 1491–1509: Fernão de Meneses, conde de Alcoutim
- 1509–1512: Pedro Barbo Alardo
- 1512–1517: Pedro de Meneses, conde de Alcoutim
- 1518–1519: João da Silva, conde de Portalegre
- 1519–1521: Gomes da Silva de Vasconcelos
- 1522–1524: João de Noronha
- 1524–1525: Pedro de Meneses, conde de Alcoutim
- 1525–1529: Gomes da Silva de Vasconcelos
- 1529–1539: Nunho Álvares Pereira de Noronha
- 1540–1549: Afonso de Noronha
- 1549 : Antão de Noronha
- 1549–1550: Martim Correia da Silva
- 1550–1553: Pedro de Meneses
- 1553 : Pedro da Cunha
- 1553 : João Rodriges Pereira
- 1553–1555: Martim Correia da Silva
- 1555–1557: Jorge Vieira
- 1557–1562: Fernão de Meneses
- 1562–1563: Miguel de Meneses, conde de Vila Real
- 1563–1564: Fernão de Meneses
- 1564–1565: Pedro da Cunha
- 1566–1567: Francisco Pereira
- 1567–1574: Manuel de Meneses e Noronha, duque de Vila Real
- 1574–1577: Diogo Lopes da França
- 1577–1578: Manuel de Meneses e Noronha, duque de Vila Real
- 1578–1580: Dionísio Pereira
- 1580–1586: Jorge Pessanha
- 1586–1591: Gil Annes da Costa
- 1591 : Francisco de Andrade (interim)
- 1591–1594: Miguel Luís de Meneses, duque de Caminha
- 1594–1597: Mendo de Ledesma
- 1597–1601: Miguel Luís de Meneses, duque de Caminha
- 1602–1605: Afonso de Noronha
- 1605–1615: Miguel Luís de Meneses, duque de Caminha
- 1615–1622: Luís de Noronha e Meneses, conde de Vila Real
- 1623 : Miguel Luís de Meneses, duque de Caminha (interim)
- 1623–1624: António da Costa Albuquerque
- 1624–1625: Fernando de Mascarenhas, conde de Torre
- 1625 : Gonçalo Correia Alcoforado (interim)
- 1625–1626: Miguel de Meneses, duque de Caminha
- 1627 : Dinís de Mascarenhas de Lencastre (interim)
- 1627–1634: Jorge de Mendonça Pessanha
- 1634–1636: Bás Teles de Meneses
- 1637 : Fernão Teles de Meneses (interim)
- 1637–1640: Francisco de Almeida

=== Spanish Governors ===
- 1640–1641: Francisco de Almeida (interim)
- 1641–1644: Juan Fernández de Córdoba y Coalla, marqués de Miranda de Auta
- 1645–1646: Luis de Lencastre, marqués de Malagón
- 1646–1653: Juan Suárez de Alarcón y Melo (from 1652 marqués de Trocifal [Turcifal])
- 1653–1661: José Fernández de Sotomayor y Lima, marqués de Tenorio
- 1661–1665: Jerónimo de Noronha, marqués de Castelo Mendo
- 1665–1670: Pedro da Cunha, marqués de Sentar
- 1670–1677: Francisco Suárez de Alarcón, conde de Torres Vedras
- 1677 : Antonio de Medina Chacón y Ponce de León (interim)
- 1677–1678: Diego de Portugal
- 1678–1679: Antonio de Medina Chacón y Ponce de León
- 1679–1681: Juan Arias-Dávila Pacheco y Téllez-Girón, conde de Puñonrostro
- 1681–1689: Francisco Baltasar de Velasco y Tovar, marqués de Berlanga
- 1689–1692: Francisco Bernardo Varona
- 1692–1695: Sebastián González de Andía y Irarrazábal Álvarez de Toldeo and Enríquez de Guzman, marqués de Valparaíso
- 1695–1698: Melchor de Avellaneda Sandoval y Rojas, marqués de Valdecañas
- 1698–1702: Francisco del Castillo Fajardo, marqués de Villadarias
- 1702 : Antonio de Zuñiga y la Cerda (interim)
- 1702–1704: José de Agulló y de Pinós, marqués de Gironella
- 1705–1709: Juan Francisco Manrique de Arana y de Iraola
- 1709–1715: Gonzalo Chacón y Orellana Mendoza de Toledo Sandoval y Rojas
- 1715–1719: Francisco Fernández de Ribadeo
- 1719 : Francisco Pérez Manchego (interim)
- 1719–1720: Luis Rigio, príncipe de Campo Florido
- 1720 : Juan Francisco Manrique de Arana y de Iraola (interim)
- 1720–1725: Francisco Fernández de Ribadeo
- 1725–1731: Manuel Luis de Orleáns, conde de Charny
- 1731–1738: Álvaro de Navia Osorio y Vigil, marqués de Santa Cruz de Marcenado
- 1738–1739: Antonio Manso y Maldonado
- 1739–1745: Pedro de Vargas Maldonado López de Carrizosa y Perea, marqués de Campofuerte
- 1745 : Juan Antonio Tineo y Fuertes (interim)
- 1745–1746: Juan José de Palafox y Centurión
- 1746–1751: José Orcasitas y Oleaga
- 1751 : Pedro Olaisa, marqués de la Matilla (interim)
- 1751–1754: Carlos Francisco de Croix, marqués de Croix
- 1754 : Juan Urbina (interim)
- 1754–1759: Miguel Agustín Carreño
- 1759–1760: José Sant Just
- 1760–1763: Juan Wanmarch Lumen de la Vice, marqués de Wanmarch (Warmack)
- 1763 : Diego de Noboa y Villamarin (interim)
- 1763–1766: Diego María de Osorio
- 1766 : Diego de Noboa y Villamarin (interim)
- 1766–1770: Francisco Antonio Tineo, marqués de Casa Tremañes
- 1770 : Diego Soler (interim)
- 1770–1783: Domingo Joaquín de Salcedo y Castellanos
- 1783–1784: Antonio Maria Imhofh
- 1784–1788: Miguel Porcel y Manrique de Arana, conde de las Lomas
- 1788–1792: José de Sotomayor y Echevarría
- 1792–1793: José de Urrutia y las Casas
- 1793–1794: Juan de Basencourt
- 1794 : Miguel Álvarez de Sotomayor y Flores, conde de Santa Clara (interim)
- 1794 : Diego de la Peña (interim)
- 1794–1798: José Vasallo
- 1798 : Ramon de Navas (interim)
- 1798–1801: Juan Bautista de Castro
- 1801–1805: Antonio Ferrero
- 1805 : Ramon de Navas (interim)
- 1805 : José de Alpudia y Valdés (interim)
- 1805–1807: Francisco de Orta y Arcos
- 1807–1808: Ramón de Carvajal
- 1808 : Manuel de Clairac (interim)
- 1808–1809: Carlos Luján (interim)
- 1809–1810: Francisco Carlos Gabriel de Gand-Vialin, vizconde de Gand
- 1810–1813: Jose María de Alós
- 1813 : José María Lastres y Mora (interim)
- 1813 : Francisco Carlos Gabriel de Gand-Vialin, vizconde de Gand
- 1813 : Pedro Grimarest (acting)
- 1813 : Andres Mendoza (interim)
- 1813–1814: Fernando Gómez de Butrón
- 1814–1815: Pedro Grimarest
- 1815 : Francisco Antonio de Villar y Herrera (interim)
- 1815–1816: Luis Antonio Flores
- 1816 : Francisco Antonio de Villar y Herrera (interim)
- 1816–1818: Juan de Potons y Morica
- 1818 : Francisco Antonio de Villar y Herrera (interim)
- 1818–1819: José Miranda
- 1819 : Pablo Menacho (interim)
- 1819–1820: Vicente Rosique (interim)
- 1820 : Francisco Antonio de Villar y Herrera (interim)
- 1820–1822: Fernando Gómez de Butrón
- 1822–1823: Álvaro María Chacón
- 1823 : Manuel Fernández (interim)
- 1823 : Antonio Quiroga (interim)
- 1823 : Francisco Antonio de Villar y Herrera (interim)
- 1823–1824: Juan María Muñoz
- 1824–1826: José Miranda
- 1826 : Joaquín Bureau (interim)
- 1826 : Julio O'Neil (interim)
- 1826–1831: Juan María Muñoz
- 1831 : Juan Cortés (interim)
- 1831–1832: Carlos Ullmann
- 1832–1833: Francisco de Haro
- 1833–1835: Mateo Ramírez de Arellano
- 1835 : Pablo Valiñán (interim)
- 1835 : Carlos Espinosa (interim)
- 1835 : Jose Villamil (interim)
- 1835–1836: Joaquín Gómez y Ansa
- 1836–1837: Francisco Sanjuanena
- 1837 : Pedro Valiñán (interim)
- 1837 : Bernardo Tacón (interim)
- 1837–1844: José María Rodríguez de Vera
- 1844 : Francisco de Paula Warleta
- 1844 : Juan Prim y Prats (interim)
- 1844 : Antonio Marui (interim)
- 1844–1848: Antonio Ordoñez

=== Governors (also Governors-general of the Captaincy-General of North Africa) ===
- 1848–1850: Antonio Ros de Olano
- 1850 : Trinidad Balboa (interim)
- 1851–1853: Cayetano Urbin
- 1853–1854: Joaquin Aguando
- 1854–1857: Mariano Rebagliato y Pescetto
- 1857–1858: Carlos Tolrá y Marsilla
- 1858–1859: Manuel Gasset y Mercader
- 1859–1864: Ramón Gómez Pulido
- 1864–1865: Manuel Álvarez Maldonado
- 1865–1866: Ramón Gómez Pulido
- 1866 : Antonio Peláez Campomanes (interim)
- 1866–1868: José Orive Sanz
- 1868 : Antonio del Rey y Caballero (interim)
- 1868–1870: Joaquín Cristón y Gasatín
- 1870–1872: Enrique Serrano y Dolz
- 1872–1873: Carlos Sáenz y Delcourt
- 1873 : Manuel Keller y García
- 1873–1875: Fulgencio Gavilá y Solá
- 1875–1876: Pedro Sartorius y Tapia
- 1876–1877: Fernando del Pino y Villamil
- 1877 : Juan García Torres
- 1877–1878: Victoriano López Pinto
- 1878–1879: José María Velasco Postigo
- 1879–1881: José Aizpurúa y Lorries Fontecha
- 1881–1883: José Merelo y Calvo
- 1883 : José Pascual de Bonanza y Soler
- 1883–1889: José López Pinto y Marín-Reina
- 1889–1891: Narciso de Fuentes y Sánchez
- 1891–1894: Miguel Correa y García
- 1894–189.: Rafael Correa y García
- 189.–1901: Jacinto de León y Barreda
- 1901–1903: Manuel de Aguilar y Diosdado
- 1903–1907: Francisco Fernández Bernal
- 1907–1908: Fernando Álvarez de Sotomayor y Flóres
- 1908–1910: José García Aldave y Mancebo
- 1910–1912: Felipe Alfau y Mendoza

=== Mayors (Alcaldes) ===
- 1912–1913: José Alvarez Sanz
- 1913–1914: José Trujillo Zafra
- 1914 : Restituto Palacios Garrido
- 1914–1915: Demetrio Guillén Conde
- 1915–1917: José Trujillo Zafra
- 1917–1918: Baldomero Blond Llanos
- 1918–1919: Joaquín García de la Torre y Almenara
- 1919–1923: Isidoro Martínez Durán

=== Chairmen of the Civic-Military Municipal Junta ===
- 1923–1927: Agustin Gómez Morato
- 1927 : José García Benítez
- 1927–1931: José Rosende Martín

=== Mayors (Alcaldes) ===
- 1923 : Demetrio Casares Vázquez
- 1923 : Eduardo Álvarez Ardanuy
- 1923–1924: Remigio González Lozana
- 1924–1926: Ricardo Rodríguez Macedo
- 1926–1927: Manuel Matres Toril
- 1927–1928: José García Benítez
- 1928–1931: José Rosende Martín
- 1931 : Antonio López Sánchez-Prado
- 1931 : Manuel Olivencia Amor
- 1931–1932: Eduardo Pérez Ortiz
- 1932–1933: David Valverde Soriano
- 1933–1936: José Victori Goñalons
- 1936 : Antonio López Sánchez-Prado
- 1936–1937: José Tejero Ruiz
- 1937–1940: Fernando López-Cantí y Sánchez
- 1940–1941: Jacinto Ochoa Ochoa
- 1941–1944: José Vidal Fernández
- 1944–1946: Francisco Ruiz Sánchez
- 1946–1950: José Rojas Feigenspan
- 1950 : Francisco López Bravo
- 1950–1957: Vicente García Arrazola
- 1957–1961: Francisco Ruiz Sánchez
- 1961–1967: Alberto Ibañez Trujillo
- 1967–1972: José Zurrón Rodríguez
- 1972–1978: Alfonso Sotelo Azorín
- 1978–1979: Ricardo Muñoz Rodriguez
- 1979 : Eduardo Hernández Lobillo
- 1979–1981: Clemente Calvo Pecino
- 1981–1983: Ricardo Muñoz Rodríguez
- 1983–1985: Francisco Fraiz Armada
- 1985–1987: Aurelio Puya Rivas
- 1987–1991: Fructuoso Miaja Sánchez
- 1991–1994: Francisco Fraiz Armada
- 1994–1995: Basilio Fernández López

For continuation after 1995, see: Mayor-President of Ceuta

== Sources ==
- World Statesmen.org
