= Manuel de Menezes, Duke of Vila Real =

Manuel of Menezes (born c. 1530) was the second son of Pedro de Menezes (in English, Peter (III) of Menezes) 5th Marquis of Vila Real and of his wife, Beatrice of Lara (daughter of Afonso, 8th Constable of Portugal).

Initially, he was baptized Manuel of Noronha, but when his older brother (the 4th Marquis of Vila Real) died unexpectedly without issue in 1564, he inherited his house and changed his family name from Noronha to Menezes, once this was the name used by the Heads of the House of Vila Real.

He inherited all titles and honours, becoming 5th Marquis of Vila Real as well as all the subsidiary titles of this House: 7th Count of Vila Real, 4th Count of Alcoutim, 5th Count of Valença and 7th Governor of Ceuta.

When King Sebastian of Portugal visited for the first time Ceuta, Dom Manuel, as Governor of the city, received the monarch with extreme magnificence.

In recognition of his strong support during the 1580 Portuguese succession crisis, Philip I of Portugal rewarded him the new title of Duke of Vila Real, on 28 February 1585.

== Marriage and children ==
He married D. Maria da Silva (granddaughter of the 2nd Count of Redondo), a chamberlady of Queen Catherine of Austria, wife of King John III of Portugal.

They had 8 children:

- Miguel Luis de Menezes, 1st Duke of Caminha and 6th Marquis of Vila Real;
- Jorge de Lara, died in childhood;
- Luis de Noronha e Menezes, 7th Marquis of Vila Real
- Beatrice de Lara, married to Pietro de' Medici, Prince of Tuscany;
- Juliana de Lara, married to Sancho de Noronha, 6th Count of Odemira;
- Filipa de Lara, a nun in the Sant'Ana monastery, in Leiria;
- Maria de Lara, a nun in the Sant'Ana monastery, in Leiria;
- Joana de Lara, married to the Portuguese nobleman João Álvares Pais de Menezes de Albuquerque

== See also ==
- Count of Vila Real
- Marquis of Vila Real
- Dukedoms in Portugal
- Governor of Ceuta

== Bibliography ==
- ”Nobreza de Portugal e do Brasil” – Vol. III, pages 527. Published by Zairol Lda., Lisbon 1989.

Portuguese nobility
Preceded by Miguel (I) de Menezes, 4th Marquis of Vila Real	Marquis of Vila Real; 1564–?	Succeeded by Miguel (II) Luís de Menezes, 6th Marquis of Vila Real
New title	Duke of Vila Real; 1585–?	Extinct
