= Count of Alcoutim =

Noble title in the Kingdom of Portugal

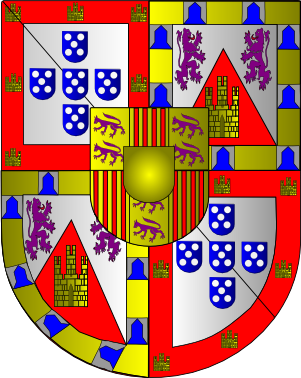
The Coat of Arms of the Marquesses of Vila Real, also Counts of Alcoutim.

Count of Alcoutim (in Portuguese Conde de Alcoutim) was a Portuguese title of nobility, subsidiary to the one of Marquis of Vila Real, created by a royal decree, dated from November 15, 1496, by King John II of Portugal, and granted to Dom Fernando de Menezes, also known as Ferdinand II of Menezes, 2nd Marquis of Vila Real, 4th Count of Vila Real and 2nd Count of Valença.

Ferdinand of Menezes had married Dona Maria Freire de Andrade, Lady of Alcoutim, and through her wife he inherited these estates.

== List of counts of Alcoutim ==
1. Fernando de Menezes, 2nd Marquis of Vila Real (1463- ? ), also known as Ferdinand II of Menezes, 4th Count of Vila Real
2. Pedro de Menezes, 3rd Marquis of Vila Real (1486- ? ), also known as Peter III of Meneses, 5th Count of Vila Real
3. Miguel de Menezes, 4th Marquis of Vila Real (1520- ? ), also known as Michael I of Menezes, 6th Count of Vila Real
4. Manuel de Meneses, 5th Marquis of Vila Real (1530- ? ), also known as Manuel of Menezes, 1st Duke of Vila Real and 7th Count of Vila Real;
5. Miguel Luís, 6th Marquis of Vila Real (1565-1637), also known as Michael II of Menezes, 1st Duke of Caminha and 8th Count of Vila Real;
6. Luis de Noronha e Meneses, 7th Marquis of Vila Real (1570- ? ), also known as Louis of Menezes, 9th Count of Vila Real

== Spanish counts of Alcoutim ==
When the 7th Marquis of Vila Real, 6th Count of Alcoutim, along with his son the Duke of Caminha, was executed in Portugal for high treason in 1641, his daughter, Beatrice of Menezes, married to the Spanish Count of Medellin, remained in Spain.

To reward her fidelity towards the Spanish Habsburgs, King Philip IV of Spain gave her, the 23 March 1660, the title of Countess of Alcoutim as a Spanish title with, included today among the titles of the House of Medinaceli.

Beatrice of Menezes never returned to her homeland and this title was never recognized in Portugal

=== Counts of Alcoutim (1660-) ===
- Beatriz de Meneses, 1st Countess of Alcoutim (1614-1668)
- Pedro Damián Portocarrero, 9th Count of Medellín and 2nd Count of Alcoutim (1640-1704), eldest son of the 1st Countess.
- Luisa Feliciana Portocarrero, 10th Countess of Medellín and 3rd Countess of Alcoutim (1641-1705), elder surviving daughter of the 1st Countess.
- Guillén Ramón de Moncada, 6th Marquis of Aitona and 4th Count of Alcoutim (1671-1727), eldest son of the 3rd Countess.
- María Teresa de Moncada, 7th Marquise of Aitona and 5th Countess of Alcoutim (1707-1756), eldest daughter of the 4th Count.
- Pedro de Alcántara Fernández de Córdoba, 12th Duke of Medinaceli and 6th Count of Alcoutim (1730-1789), eldest son of the 5th Countess.
- Luis Fernández de Córdoba, 13th Duke of Medinaceli and 7th Count of Alcoutim (1749-1806), eldest son of the 6th Count.
- Luis Fernández de Córdoba, 14th Duke of Medinaceli and 8th Count of Alcoutim (1780-1840), eldest son of the 7th Count.
- Luis Fernández de Córdoba, 15th Duke of Medinaceli and 9th Count of Alcoutim (1813-1873), elder son of the 8th Count.
- Luis Fernández de Córdoba, 16th Duke of Medinaceli and 10th Count of Alcoutim (1851-1879), elder son of the 9th Count.
- Luis Fernández de Córdoba, 17th Duke of Medinaceli and 11th Count of Alcoutim (1880-1956), elder son of the 10th Count.
- Victoria Eugenia Fernández de Córdoba, 18th Duchess of Medinaceli and 12th Countess of Alcoutim (1917-2013), eldest daughter of the 11th Count.
- Ana Luisa de Medina, Marquise of Navahermosa (1940-2012).
- Princess Victoria of Hohenlohe-Langenburg, 20th Duchess of Medinaceli, Current Countess of Alcoutim (b.1997)

== See also ==
- Duke of Vila Real
- Duke of Caminha
- Marquis of Vila Real
- Count of Vila Real
- Count of Valença
- Dukedoms in Portugal
- List of marquisates in Portugal
- List of countships in Portugal

== Bibliography ==
”Nobreza de Portugal e do Brasil" – Vol. II, page 220. Published by Zairol Lda., Lisbon 1989.
