= Fernando de Noronha, 2nd Count of Vila Real =

Castilian-Portuguese nobleman

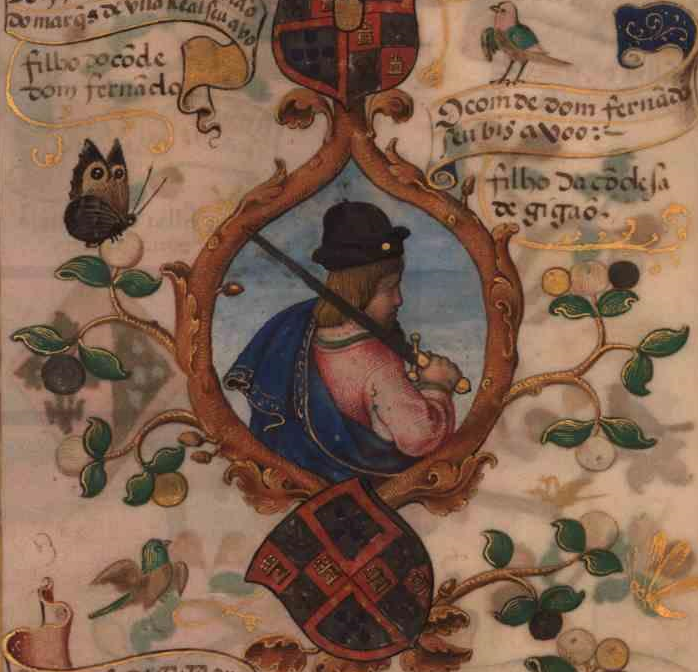
The Count of Vila Real in the Genealogy of Manuel Pereira, 3rd Count of Feira (1534)

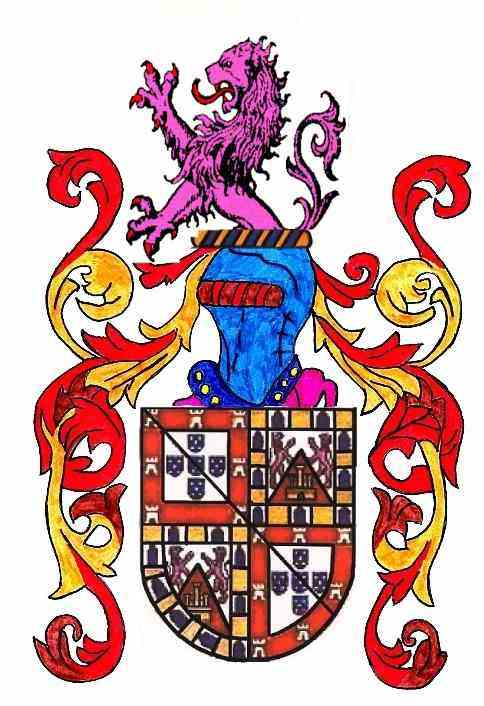
Coat of Arms of Noronha family.

Dom Fernando de Noronha (c. 1380 in Burgos – 2 or 3 June 1445 in Ceuta) was a 15th-century Castilian-Portuguese nobleman. He was the 2nd Count of Vila Real, a title which he acquired and shared by his marriage to Brites de Menezes, 2nd Countess of Vila Real and the third Portuguese governor of Ceuta from 1437.

Fernando de Noronha united two prominent bastard lines of the crowns of Castile and Portugal. He was the second son from the marriage of Alfonso Enríquez, Count of Gijón and Noreña (a natural son of King Henry II of Castile) and Isabel of Portugal, Lady of Viseu (a natural daughter of King Ferdinand I of Portugal). After the death of Alfonso Enríquez, Isabel fled to the court of her uncle, King John I of Portugal. Her children were raised in the Portuguese court, where they were known by their appellation Noronha (Portuguese translation of Noreña). Fernando's elder brother, Pedro de Noronha, would become an Archbishop of Lisbon.

On 18 October 1430, Fernando de Noronha married Brites de Menezes, the daughter of the prominent Portuguese nobleman Pedro de Menezes, 1st Count of Vila Real and first Portuguese governor of Ceuta. Brites competed with her half-brother Duarte de Menezes for her father's titles for herself and her consort. Fernando de Noronha secured the office of councillor and chamberlain in the household of the royal prince and heir Infante Edward.

By a royal letter issued September 1434 by the now-enthroned King Edward of Portugal, Fernando and Brites succeeded in securing the inheritance of her father's title of Count of Vila Real, leaving Duarte with the old family title of Count of Viana do Alentejo. Despite Duarte's notable military record as his father's lieutenant in Ceuta, Brites managed once again to pip out Duarte and secure the appointment (October 1437) of her husband Fernando de Noronha as the next Portuguese governor of Ceuta, succeeding the late Pedro de Menezes.

Fernando de Noronha was appointed to Ceuta only days before a Portuguese expeditionary force, led by Henry the Navigator, was defeated by the army of Marinid Morocco (see Battle of Tangier (1437)). To save his army from destruction, Henry agreed to a treaty, signed on 17 October 1437, by which Portugal committed itself to deliver Ceuta back to the Marinids, in return for which the Portuguese prince Ferdinand the Saint Prince would remain as a hostage in Moroccan captivity until its fulfillment. As a result, upon his arrival in Ceuta, Noronha was surprised to hear that a treaty had been signed to evacuate the garrison he had just been appointed to command. Moreover, Prince Henry had sailed directly from Tangier to Ceuta and barricaded himself in his lodgings, sunk in a deep depression and refusing to talk with anyone. Noronha was not sure how to proceed.

By several accounts, Fernando de Noronha was determined not to lose this lucrative perch (his predecessor had made a substantial personal fortune from ransoms and pirate kickbacks.) Noronha probably had a role in stiffening Henry's resolve to write to King Edward from Ceuta, recommending the Portuguese renege on the treaty he had himself signed. But Henry's older brother, Peter of Coimbra, was set on fulfilling the treaty and securing Ferdinand's release. In 1440, after Edward died and Peter became regent of the realm, ambassadors were dispatched to Asilah to negotiate the logistics of the swap of Ceuta for the captive Ferdinand. The Marinids' preliminary condition was that Fernando de Noronha be relieved from the office of governor of Ceuta - his reputation was such that the Marinid officials were certain Noronha would contrive to prevent the swap. Peter agreed, and in April 1440 (or 1441), he dispatched D. Fernando de Castro at the head of a Portuguese flotilla, with instructions and credentials to take the city from Noronha, and begin the evacuation of the garrison. As it happens, before his arrival, Castro's flotilla was intercepted by Genoese pirates and Castro killed - an incident in which some suspected Noronha might have had a hand (Ceuta had long served as a corsair's nest). Nonetheless, Peter of Coimbra hurriedly instructed Fernando's son, Álvaro de Castro, to take over his father's credentials and fulfill the mission.

As it happens, the logistics of the swap turned out to be more complicated than anticipated. Abu Zakariya Yahya al-Wattasi, the vizier of the Marinid palace of Fez, promised to deliver Ferdinand only after Ceuta was evacuated and in his hands, but Castro (under the watchful eye and counsel of Noronha) rejected the proposal, demanding possession of Ferdinand first. Negotiations dragged on fruitlessly for the next few months, and eventually broke down. The swap was never undertaken, Ceuta remained in Portuguese hands and Ferdinand perished in Moroccan captivity in June 1443.

Fernando de Noronha died in Ceuta in June 1445.

Fernando de Noronha and Brites de Menezes had two sons:

- Pedro de Menezes, 3rd Count (1st Marquis) of Vila Real (from which stems the Portuguese noble house of Count of Vila Real)
- João de Noronha, Lord of Sortelha (from which stems the Portuguese noble house of Count of Monsanto)
