= Beatriz de Menezes, 2nd Countess of Vila Real =

Portuguese noblewoman

Dona Beatriz de Menezes (1400 – c. 1460) (sometimes written as 'Brites de Meneses') was a Portuguese noblewoman. She was the 2nd Countess of Vila Real from 1437, a title she shared with her consort, Fernando de Noronha.

Brites de Meneses was the eldest legitimate daughter of D. Pedro de Menezes, 1st Count of Vila Real and Margarida de Miranda. On October 30, 1430, Brites married the Castilian-Portuguese nobleman Fernando de Noronha, the son of two bastard lines of the royal houses of Portugal and Castile (i.e. Fernando de Noronha was a grandson of Henry II of Castile and Ferdinand I of Portugal).

Brites de Meneses competed with her half-brother Duarte de Menezes (born illegitimate, but legitimized by royal letter) to secure the inheritance of her father's titles for herself and her husband. Upon her father Pedro de Meneses' death in 1437, the titles were distributed - the crown-granted title of Count of Vila Real went to Brites and Fernando, while the older family title of Count of Viana do Alentejo went to Duarte.

Brites de Menezes had two legitimate sons from her marriage to Fernando de Noronha:

- Pedro de Menezes, 3rd Count (1st Marquis) of Vila Real (from which stems the Portuguese noble house of Count of Vila Real)
- João de Noronha, Lord of Sortelha (from which stems the Portuguese noble house of Count of Monsanto)
