= Francisco Sanjuanena =

Spanish politician

Francisco Sanjuanena (1787 in Salamanca - 1844 in Jaraicejo) was the governor of Ceuta from 1836 to 1837.
