= Duke of Vila Real =

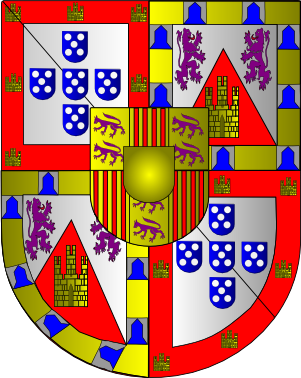
The Coat of Arms of the Duke of Vila Real.

Duke of Vila Real (in Portuguese Duque de Vila Real) was a Portuguese title of nobility created by royal decree, dated from February 28, 1585, by King Philip I of Portugal (also known as Philip II of Spain), and granted to Dom Manuel de Menezes, 5th Marquis of Vila Real and 7th Count of Vila Real.

The title was granted by the King in one life, to the 5th Marquis of Vila Real, due his personal support to the Spanish Habsburgs during the 1580 Portuguese succession crisis.

== List of dukes of Vila Real ==
1. Manuel de Menezes, Duke of Vila Real (1530- ? ), also known as Manuel of Meneses, 5th Marquis of Vila Real and 7th Count of Vila Real.

== See also ==
- Marquis of Vila Real
- Duke of Caminha
- Count of Vila Real
- Count of Alcoutim
- Dukedoms in Portugal

== Bibliography ==
”Nobreza de Portugal e do Brasil" – Vol. III, pages 523/528. Published by Zairol Lda., Lisbon 1989.
