= Duke of Caminha =

Former Portuguese nobility title

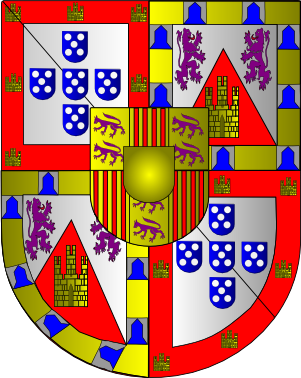
The coat of arms of the Dukes of Caminha

Duke of Caminha (Portuguese: Duque de Caminha) was a title created by royal decree, dated 14 December 1620, by King Philip III of Portugal (also known as Philip IV of Spain) for Dom Miguel Luís de Menezes, 6th Marquis of Vila Real and 8th Count of Vila Real. He was the eldest son of Manuel de Menezes, Duke of Vila Real.

The title was later passed on to his nephew Miguel Luís II, who became the 2nd Duke of Caminha. He was executed for high treason, on King John IV of Portugal's instructions, for supporting the right of the Spanish Habsburg kings to the Portuguese throne after the revolution of 1640.

== List of dukes of Caminha (1620) ==
1. Miguel Luís de Menezes, 1st Duke of Caminha (1565–1637), also 6th Marquis of Vila Real.
2. Miguel Luís de Menezes, 2nd Duke of Caminha (1614–1641).

== See also ==
- Duke of Vila Real
- Marquis of Vila Real
- Count of Alcoutim

== Bibliography ==
- ”Nobreza de Portugal e do Brasil" – Vol. II, pages 470/471. Published by Zairol Lda., Lisbon 1989.
