= Igreja da Graça (Santarém) =

Church in Santarém, Portugal

Coordinates: 39°14′05″N 8°40′49″W

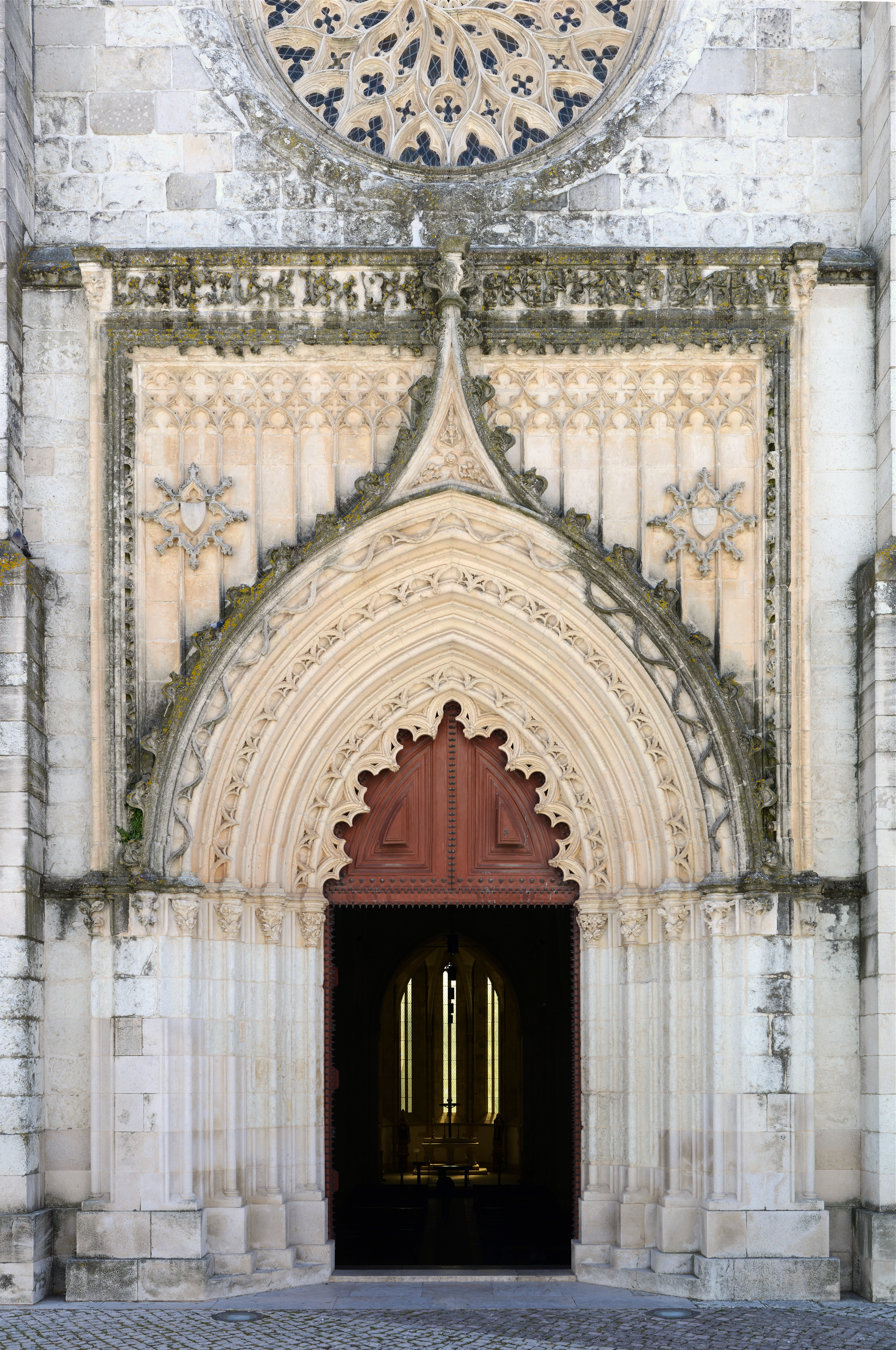
Main portal of Igreja da Graça

Igreja da Graça is a church in Santarém, Portugal. It is classified as a National Monument.
