= Count of Vila Real =

Countship Vila Real
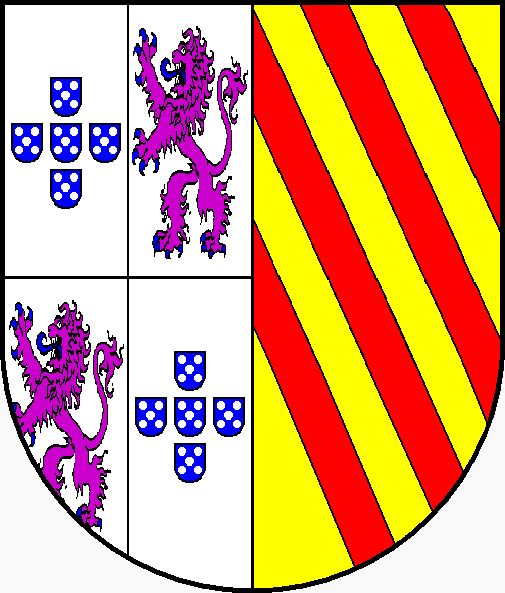
- Creation date: 3 July 1823
- Creation: Second
- Created by: João VI of Portugal
- First holder: Pedro de Meneses, 1st Count of Vila Real
- Last holder: José Luís de Sousa Botelho Mourão e Vasconcelos, 3rd Count of Vila Real
- Status: Extinct
- Extinction date: 1910 (Monarchy abolished)

Count of Vila Real (Portuguese: Conde de Vila Real) is a Portuguese title of nobility created twice in the Kingdom of Portugal, firstly, by a royal decree, in 1424, by King John I of Portugal, and granted to Dom Pedro de Menezes, also known as Peter I of Menezes, 2nd Count of Viana (do Alentejo), and, secondly, in the 19th century, King John VI of Portugal, revived the title and granted it, by royal decree, on July 3, 1823, to José Luís de Sousa Botelho Mourão e Vasconcelos.

== History ==
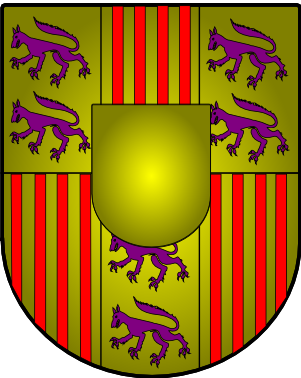
The coat of arms of the 1st Count and 2nd Countess of Vila Real

=== First creation (1424) ===
The Menezes, a high nobility and influential family, quite close to the first dynasty kings in Portugal, were negatively affected when the new Aviz kings came to power, after the 1383–1385 crisis, but Pedro de Menezes supported the new king John of Aviz and was later rewarded.

He was involved in the north African conquests, and became the first governor of Ceuta after the Portuguese conquest (1415).

He married four times from which he had three daughters. The eldest was Beatrice of Menezes, married to Fernando of Noronha (grandson of King Fernando I of Portugal through his mother, Infanta Isabel of Portugal). Their issue used Menezes as family name and they originated the powerful House of Vila Real.

In recognition of their support during the 1580 Portuguese succession crisis, the Spanish Habsburgs granted the House of Vila Real new titles, including Duke of Vila Real and Duke of Caminha. However, following the Portuguese Restoration in 1640, all these titles and estates were confiscated, and Miguel Luís II, 2nd Duke of Caminha, was executed for high treason by order of King John IV of Portugal, due to his allegiance to the Spanish Habsburg claim to the Portuguese throne, consequently, this line became extinct in 1641.

=== Second creation (1823) ===
Later, in the 19th century, King John VI of Portugal, revived the title and granted it by royal decree on July 3, 1823 (second creation), to José Luis de Sousa Botelho Mourão e Vasconcelos (1785–1855), a remarkable military and politician who fought during the Napoleonic invasions and the Liberal wars. He was 6th Lord of Mateus and members of the House Mateus married into the families of the Count of Mangualde and the Count of Melo.

== Counts of Vila Real (1424: First creation) ==
#	Portrait	Holder	Dates	Titles	Notes
1		Pedro de Menezes, 1st Count of Vila Real	1370–1437	1st Count of Vila Real	Also 2nd Count of Viana do Alentejo
2		Brites de Menezes Fernando of Noronha	1400–1460 1380–1445	2nd Count of Vila Real	Co-shared title
3		Pedro II de Menezes	1425–1499	3rd Count of Vila Real	Later became 1st Marquis of Vila Real
4		Fernando de Menezes	1463–?	4th Count of Vila Real	Also 2nd Marquis of Vila Real
5		Pedro III de Menezes	1486–1543	5th Count of Vila Real	Also 3rd Marquis of Vila Real
6		Miguel de Menezes	1534–1564	6th Count of Vila Real	Also 4th Marquis of Vila Real
7		Manuel de Menezes	1530–1590	7th Count of Vila Real	Also 5th Marquis of Vila Real; Also 1st Duke of Vila Real
8		Miguel II Luís de Menezes	1565–1637	8th Count of Vila Real	Also 6th Marquis of Vila Real; Also 1st Duke of Caminha; Executed for high treason
9		Luís de Noronha e Meneses	1570–1641	9th Count of Vila Real	7th Marquis of Vila Real; Executed for high treason; Died without issue, therefore line became extinct

== Counts of Vila Real (1832: Second creation) ==
#	Portrait	Holder	Dates	Titles	Notes
1		José Luís de Sousa Botelho Mourão e Vasconcelos	1785–1855	1st Count of Vila Real	Also 6th Lord of Mateus
2		Fernando de Sousa Botelho Mourão e Vasconcelos	1815–1858	2nd Count of Vila Real	Also 7th Lord of Mateus
3		José Luís de Sousa Botelho Mourão e Vasconcelos	1843–1923	3rd Count of Vila Real	Also 8th Lord of Mateus

== Claimants post-Monarchy ==
#	Portrait	Holder	Dates	Titles	Notes
4		Maria Teresa de Sousa Botelho e Melo	1871–1947	4th Countess of Vila Real	Also 3rd Countess of Melo and 2nd Countess of Mangualde, by marriage to Fernando de Almeida Cardoso de Albuquerque, 2nd Count of Mangualde
5		Francisco de Sousa Botelho e Albuquerque	1909–1973	5th Count of Vila Real	Also 3rd Count of Mangualde and 4th Count of Melo
6		Fernando de Sousa Botelho de Albuquerque	1941–2022	6th Count of Vila Real	Also 4th Count of Mangualde (1973) and 5th Count of Melo (1973)

== See also ==
- Duke of Vila Real
- Marquis of Vila Real
- Duke of Caminha
- Dukedoms in Portugal
- List of marquisates in Portugal
- List of countships in Portugal

== Bibliography ==
- CAMPOS, Nuno Silva: D. Pedro de Meneses and the Creation of the House of Vila Real (1417–1437). Colibri Editions/CIDEHUS-UE, 2004;
- FREIRE, Anselmo Braamcamp: Brasões da Sala de Sintra. 3 Vols. 3rd Edition, Imprensa Nacional-Casa da Moeda, 1996;
- Livro do Armeiro-Mor (1509). 2nd edition. Preface by Joaquim Veríssimo Serrão; Presentation by Vasco Graça Moura; Introduction, Brief History, Description, and Analysis by José Calvão Borges. Portuguese Academy of History/Inapa Editions, 2007;
- Livro da Nobreza e Perfeiçam das Armas (António Godinho, 16th century). Facsimile of MS. 164 of the Casa Forte from the National Archive of Torre do Tombo. Introduction and Notes by Martim Albuquerque and João Paulo de Abreu e Lima. Inapa Editions, 1987;
- Nobreza de Portugal e do Brasil" – Vol. III, pages 522/528. Published by Zairol Lda., Lisbon 1989;
