= Battle of Tangier (1437) =

Failed Portuguese invasion of the Marinid city

- Part of Moroccan–Portuguese conflicts
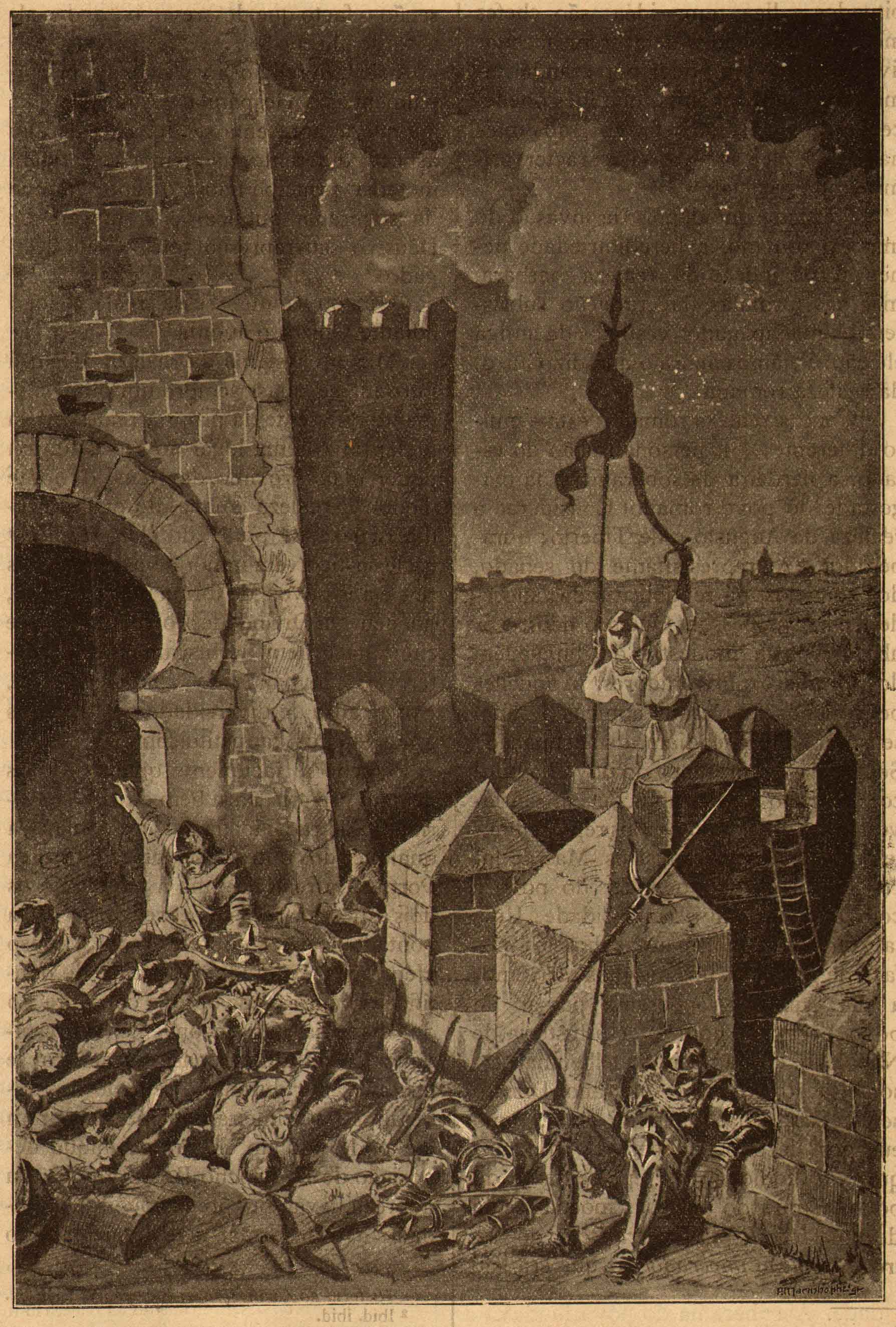
- Attempt to take Tangier - História de Portugal, popular e ilustrada c. 1899
Date	13 September – 19 October 1437
Location	Tangier, Morocco
Result	Marinid victory

Belligerents
(Kingdom of Portugal) Portuguese Empire	Marinid Sultanate

Commanders and leaders
Henry, Duke of Viseu	Salah ibn Salah; Abu Zakariya Yahya al-Wattasi

Strength
6,000–8,000 troops	2,000 in the fortress First relief force of 10,000 horsemen and 90,000 foot Second relief force even larger

Casualties and losses
500 killed, 3,500 taken hostage.	Uncertain

The Battle of Tangier, sometimes referred to as the siege of Tangiers, and by the Portuguese, as the disaster of Tangier (Portuguese: Desastre de Tânger), refers to the attempt by a Portuguese expeditionary force to seize the Moroccan citadel of Tangier and its defeat by the armies of the Marinid Sultanate in 1437.

The Portuguese expeditionary force, led by Prince Henry the Navigator, Duke of Viseu, set out from Portugal in August 1437, intending to seize a series of Moroccan coastal citadels. The Portuguese laid siege to Tangier in mid-September. After a few failed assaults on the city, the Portuguese force was attacked and defeated by a large Moroccan relief army led by vizier Abu Zakariya Yahya al-Wattasi of Fez. The Marinids encircled the Portuguese siege camp and starved it to submission. To preserve his army from destruction, Henry negotiated a treaty promising to return the citadel of Ceuta (captured earlier in 1415) to Morocco in return for being allowed to withdraw his troops. The terms of the treaty never were fulfilled; the Portuguese decided to hold on to Ceuta and allowed the Portuguese hostage, the king's own brother Ferdinand the Holy Prince, to remain in Moroccan captivity, where he perished in 1443.

The Tangier fiasco was a tremendous setback for the prestige and reputation of Henry the Navigator, who personally conceived, promoted and led the expedition. Simultaneously, it was an enormous boon to the political fortunes of the vizier Abu Zakariya Yahya al-Wattasi, who was transformed overnight from an unpopular regent to a national hero, allowing him to consolidate his power over Morocco.

This was the first of four attempts by the Portuguese to seize the city of Tangier in the 15th century.

== Background ==
The Moroccan citadel of Ceuta, on the southern side of the Strait of Gibraltar, had been seized in 1415 in a surprise attack by the Kingdom of Portugal. (See Conquest of Ceuta). The Marinids had tried to recover it in 1418–1419, but failed. The assassination of the Marinid sultan in 1420 sent Morocco reeling into political chaos and internal disorder for the next few years, giving the Portuguese time to entrench themselves in Ceuta.

Whatever its original objectives, the capture of Ceuta had profited the Portuguese little. The Marinids had cut off all of Ceuta's trade and supplies from the landward side. Ceuta became little more than a large, empty, windswept fortress-city, with an expensive Portuguese garrison that had to be continually re-supplied from across the sea. There had been no follow-up Portuguese campaigns in North Africa, with the result that the Ceuta garrison had little to do, beyond waiting and eating through the king's treasury. There were growing calls in the Portuguese court to simply withdraw the troops and abandon Ceuta.

=== Henry's proposal ===
In 1416, King John I of Portugal placed his son, the Portuguese Prince Henry the Navigator, Duke of Viseu, in charge of supplying and provisioning Ceuta. As a result, Henry was disinclined to abandoning the city, and instead urged an expansion of Portuguese holdings in Morocco.

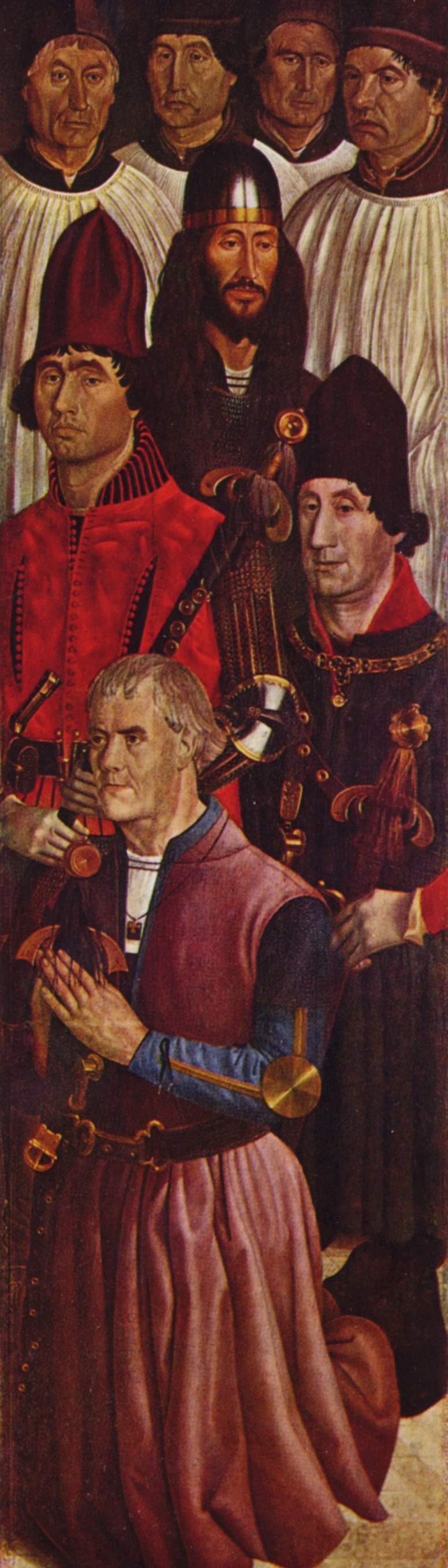
Panel of the polyptych of St. Vicent by painter Nuno Gonçalves, believed to represent the four younger sons of John I: Ferdinand the Holy (on top, in black), John of Reguengos (left, red), Peter of Coimbra (right, green), Henry the Navigator (bottom, purple)

In 1432, Henry the Navigator proposed to his father King John I of Portugal an ambitious project to allow him to lead a war of conquest of Marinid territories, or at least carve out a wider regional enclave in the north. The king called on the royal council, including the rest of his sons – the Ínclita Geração – for consultation. Henry's brothers, the princes Edward of Portugal, Peter of Coimbra, John of Reguengos, their half-brother Afonso of Barcelos and Afonso's grown sons, Ferdinand of Arraiolos and Afonso of Ourém, almost unanimously pronounced themselves against the project. They cited the lack of Portuguese manpower and the huge expense of conquering and holding such a large area, and questioned the purpose and legal basis of the conquest. Moreover, they subtly expressed doubts about Henry's ability to lead such an expedition, and suggested that if Henry was intent on military glory or crusade, then he perhaps ought to enter the service of the Crown of Castile and campaign on the Granadan frontier instead. (Indeed, such a proposal was submitted to Castile a month later (July 1432) by a Portuguese emissary, but was rejected out of hand by the Castilian strongman Álvaro de Luna.)

In defense of the project, Henry pointed out the Marinid Sultante was deeply fractured among rebellious lords and the leadership in Fez was embroiled in political crisis. The young Marinid sultan Abd al-Haqq II was coming of age, but his unpopular Wattasid vizier (and regent since 1420), Abu Zakariya Yahya al-Wattasi, refused to yield power. Henry calculated the divided and distracted Marinids would not be able to organize much of a defense, that the time was opportune to take another piece of Morocco. Henry also believed the manpower concerns were exaggerated, that it would be sufficient to seize and hold the critical ports of Tangier, Ksar es-Seghir, and Asilah, to exert Portuguese dominance over all of northern Morocco, and that should the pope give the campaign the privileges of a crusade, soldiers from all over Portugal and Christian Europe would rally to enlist and fill in the gap.

King John I seemed inclined towards the project, but died in 1433 before any steps were taken. His oldest son and successor, Edward of Portugal, set the project aside, but Henry continued lobbying for it. Henry soon obtained a critical ally, his youngest brother Prince Ferdinand, who was dissatisfied with his meager estates in Portugal and eager to seek his fortune overseas. In 1435, Henry and Ferdinand jointly informed Edward that they intended to campaign in Morocco on their own if need be, with their own resources, taking their military orders with them: Henry his Order of Christ and Ferdinand his Order of Aviz. Edward, backed by his other brothers, tried to dissuade them, and urged Henry and Ferdinand to go on campaign for Castile instead. This time, however, Henry seemed to have roped in an unlikely ally, Edward's wife, Eleanor of Aragon. Being the sister of the rebellious 'Infantes of Aragon', Eleanor had no desire to see Portuguese arms used to assist the Crown of Castile, and she nudged her husband toward authorizing the Moroccan expedition. What probably finally won Edward over was the bachelor Henry's promise to adopt Edward's younger son, Infante Ferdinand (future Duke of Viseu), as the sole heir to all his seigneurial estates, thus relieving the king from having to provide for his inheritance. Henry wrote his will in his nephew's favor in March 1436, and that very month, Edward launched preparations for the expedition.

=== Preparations ===
In March, Edward and Henry outlined the first plans for a campaign to capture Tangier, Ksar es-Seghir, and Asilah. The total force envisaged was 14,000 – 4,000 horse and 10,000 foot. (Or, more precisely in Pina's breakdown: 3,500 knights, 500 mounted archers, 7,000 infantry, 2,500 foot archers, and 500 servants.) Contractors were sent immediately for the ports of England, Castile, Flanders, and northern Germany to contract additional transport ships and supplies.

In mid-April, King Edward of Portugal assembled the Portuguese Cortes in Evora to raise funds for the expedition. The proposal met a skeptical response. The burghers were opposed to the expedition. Nonetheless, the Cortes voted for a modest subsidy, not without complaint.

According to chronicler Ruy de Pina, Edward 'forgot' to summon the dissenting brothers – Peter of Coimbra, John of Reguengos, and Afonso of Barcelos – to the Evora parliament. So the three were invited to the king's court in Leiria in August to submit their votes. Although they were warned by the king that their vote was immaterial, that the project was going forward regardless, all three nonetheless insisted on registering their vote against it.

=== Papal bulls ===
In the meantime, Henry the Navigator had been busy lobbying the pope to endorse the expedition. This bore fruit in September, when Pope Eugenius IV issued the bull Rex Regnum blessing the Tangiers enterprise with the privileges of a crusade. However this was not issued without misgivings. Pope Eugenius IV requested learned opinions on the legality of Henry's war of conquest in Muslim Morocco. The legal opinions, delivered between August and October, notably the reports by Bologna jurists Antonio Minucci da Pratoveccio and Antonio de Rosellis, deeply doubted the jus bellum foundations of the expedition.

However, another of Henry's side-projects nearly sunk the whole enterprise. The same month (September), Pope Eugenius IV issued another bull at Henry's request, Romanus Pontifex, granting Portugal the right to subjugate the unconquered part of the Canary Islands. This bold intrusion roused the Crown of Castile, who had long laid claim to the islands, and was still in the process of conquering them. The Castilian prelate Alfonso de Cartagena, Bishop of Burgos, then attending the Council of Basel, launched a legal offensive, supplying volumes of documents proving that all of the Canaries rightfully belonged to Castile. Recognizing that he had been misled by Henry, Pope Eugenius IV withdrew the Canaries bull that November.

Alfonso de Cartagena was not done. Eager to punish Henry for his impertinence, the Castilian diplomat submitted more claims – urging the pope to restore several Portuguese bishoprics back under Compostela's jurisdiction, to revoke the autonomy of the Portuguese military orders (and fold them under the Castilian orders), to revoke the Tangier bull in light of Castile's 'right of conquest' over Morocco and even demanding the handover of Ceuta as rightfully Castilian (a point that had never been raised before). While it is probable that Cartagena was only half-serious, and sought merely to rattle Henry, the sudden splurge of Castilian claims nearly sank the Tangier expedition, and opened alarm at the prospect of a new war between Portugal and Castile.

The quarrel was still going strong through spring 1437. On April 30, Pope Eugenius IV issued the bull Dominatur Dominus revoking some portions of the prior September's Tangier bull, which might be interpreted as implicating the Castilian right of conquest. As late as May, Edward of Portugal was threatening to cancel the Tangier expedition and take arms against Castile to defend some controversial border parishes. However, the diplomatic quarrel calmed down and faded by early Summer 1437.

=== Departure ===
In late summer 1437, after a year of preparation, the Portuguese expeditionary force was finally ready. The levies had been disappointing. Pina reports only some 6,000 Portuguese soldiers in all (3,000 knights, 2,000 infantry, 1,000 archers) – that is, less than half of the 14,000 force anticipated. Álvares reports higher numbers – 7,000 out of Lisbon, plus additions from Porto and Ceuta. Nonetheless, the turnout was much lower than expected, in good part due on the unpopularity of the expedition, but there were problems with contracting transports abroad. The transport ships that showed up (mostly English and Basque) were hardly enough to ferry even this reduced force. It is reported that some of the levies (as much as a quarter) had to be left behind in Lisbon. Nonetheless, it was decided to press forward, assuming the remainder would be eventually ferried when the missing transports arrived.

By King Edward's order, Prince Henry the Navigator was assigned overall command of the expedition, and was to sail with the troops from Lisbon. His experienced nephew Ferdinand (Count of Arraiolos) (who earlier pronounced himself against the expedition) was appointed constable of the nobles and sent to Porto to organize the embarcation of troops from northern Portugal. Among the other nobles participating in the enterprise were Henry's brother Ferdinand the Holy Prince (naturally), the marshal of the kingdom Vasco Fernandes Coutinho (future Count of Marialva) and the admiral of the sail fleet (capitão-mor da frota) Álvaro Vaz de Almada (future Count of Avranches). The prelate D. Álvaro de Abreu (Bishop of Evora) would go as papal legate. The knights of Henry's Order of Christ and Ferdinand's Order of Aviz were ordered to follow their masters to North Africa. D. Fernando de Castro, governor of Henry's household, led the Henry's household knights and squires, while his relative and namesake D. Fernando de Castro 'o Cegonho', governor of Infante Ferdinand's household, led the latter's household knights.

On August 17, 1437, there was a solemn ceremony at the Lisbon Cathedral, where Henry received Edward's royal standard. After receiving their final instructions, the Lisbon fleet left the harbor of Belém on August 22.

=== Morocco's defenses ===
Unlike at Ceuta in 1415, the Portuguese did not enjoy the element of surprise. The noisy diplomacy and lengthy preparations had given Marinids, despite their political divisions, ample time to prepare the defenses of the targeted citadels. Fortifications were improved, garrisons were reinforced, and the mountain passes around Ceuta were sealed.

Seeing this already in motion in 1436, the Ceuta commander D. Pedro de Menezes (Count of Vila Real) dispatched a detachment of his garrison under his son Duarte de Menezes to raid the Moroccan city of Tétouan to the south to prevent it from becoming a threat to future Portuguese operations. but this did not seem to affect the strengthening of Moroccan defenses elsewhere.

Tangier was under the command of the Marinid governor Salah ibn Salah (called Çallabençalla by the Portuguese chronicles), the same man who had been governor of Ceuta back in 1415, now probably quite advanced in years, and probably eager for revenge. (Salah ibn Salah was a Marinid vassal whose original dominions ranged along the northern coast, including Asilah, Tangier, and Ceuta). Salah ibn Salah counted on a garrison of about 7,000 men, including a contingent of crack sharpshooters imported from the Emirate of Granada.

In the Marinid capital of Fez, the strongman Abu Zakariya Yahya al-Wattasi (called Lazeraque by the Portuguese chroniclers), the unpopular vizier of the young Marinid sultan Abd al-Haqq II (called Abdelac in the chronicles), launched an appeal for national unity and holy war to expel the Portuguese intruders. Although, for the past 15 years, Morocco had fragmented into virtually autonomous statelets ruled by rival regional governors, paying only lip service (if any) to the Marinid sultan, the governors answered Abu Zakariya's call. Troops from all corners of Morocco were set into motion, ready to place themselves at Fez's disposal to relieve Tangier and expel the infidel invaders.

== Portuguese siege of Tangiers ==
=== March from Ceuta ===
Henry's Lisbon fleet arrived in Ceuta on August 27, where they were greeted by the Ceuta garrison commander D. Pedro de Menezes (Count of Vila Real). The Porto fleet of Ferdinand of Arraiolos had arrived shortly before. A muster was held and commands assigned. Rather than wait for new transports to bring the troops that were left behind, Henry determined to continue with the ones he had.

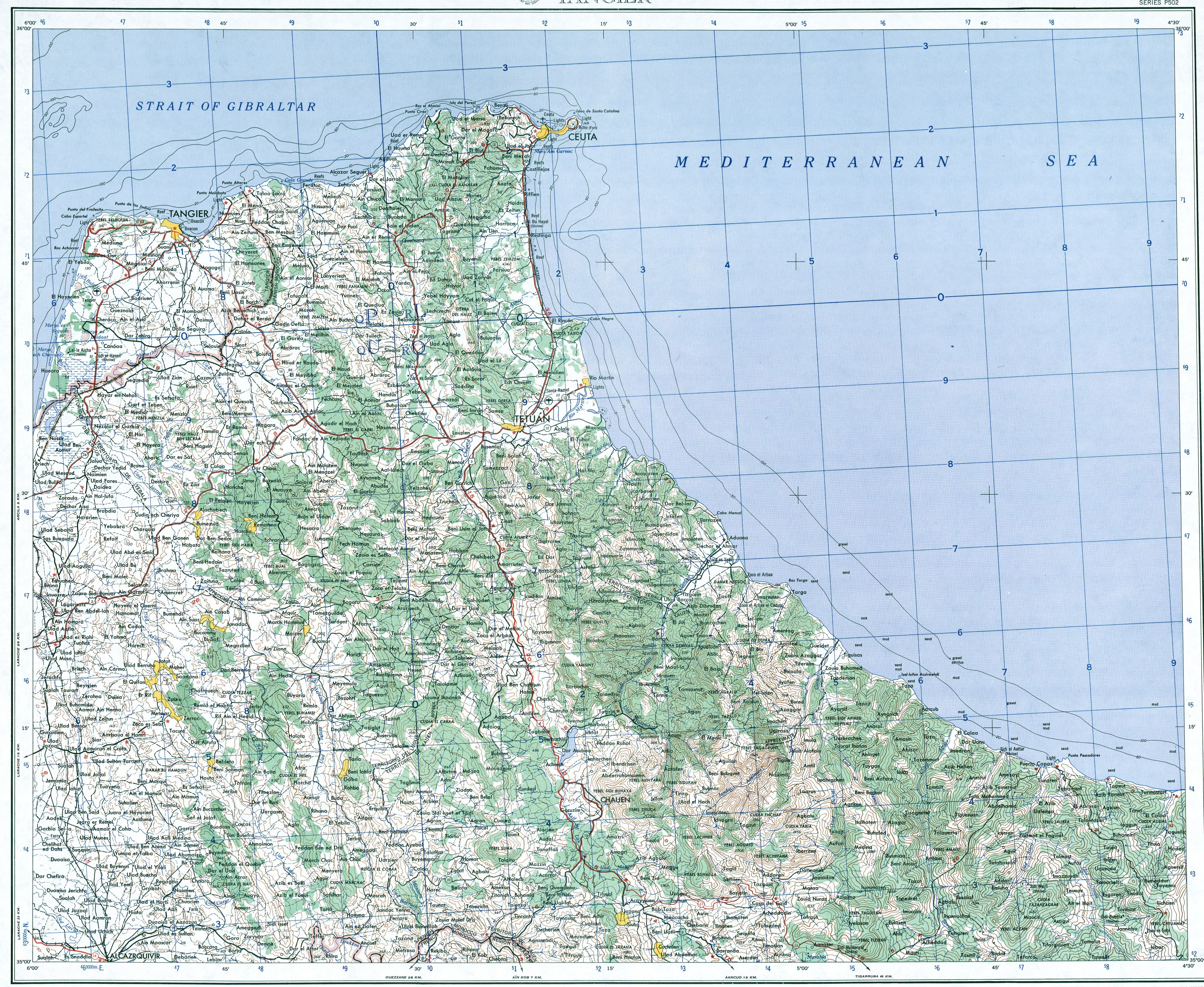
Topographic map of the region around Tangier and Ceuta (1954 map)

The original plan was probably to proceed along the coast and seize Ksar es-Seghir, then Tangier and then Asilah in sequence, but this was quickly shelved. A scouting force sent out to examine the road to Ksar es-Seghir found strong resistance in the mountain passes leading to the city. As a result, Henry and his war council decided to side-step Ksar es-Seghir and aim for Tangier first. The army was split – part of it would go by ship with Prince Ferdinand while the bulk would march overland under Henry's personal command. The overland column was to take a long circuitous loop, through the south via the ruins of Tétouan, then across the mountains and back up to Tangier.

Henry's overland column left Ceuta on September 9 in nearly processional array. The vanguard was led by Ferdinand of Arraiolos. The right wing was led by D. Fernando de Castro (head of Henry's household), the left wing by his relative and namesake D. Fernando de Castro 'o Cegonho' (head of Ferdinand's household). Henry himself led the center. D. Duarte de Menezes carried the royal standard in his father's place (Ceuta governor D. Pedro de Menezes was the alferes-mor, or official standard bearer of the realm, but had fallen ill at this time and was forced to remain behind.) Henry's personal standard was carried by Rui de Mello da Cunha. To inspire the troops, religious banners were unfurled bearing the images of the Virgin Mary, Christ as Crusader, the late King John I and the late beatified constable Nuno Álvares Pereira. The papal legate D.Álvaro de Abreu, Bishop of Evora, carried a piece of the True Cross, lent by Pope Eugenius IV for the occasion.

The overland column did not meet any significant incidents, and arrived in the outskirts of Tangier on September 13. Ferdinand had already disembarked on a nearby beach (around Punta de los Judios). According to eyewitness Frei João Álvares, Henry launched the first assault on Tangier on the very day he arrived, but chronicler Ruy de Pina reports the first assault was not launched until a week later. (For this article, the dating and events largely follows Pina's account. The alternative timeline of Álvares will be summarized later.)

According to Pina, the Portuguese spent about a week raising a fortified siege camp on a hill west of Tangier. In a decision that later proved fateful, Henry ordered that the palisade protecting the Portuguese siege camp encircle the camp completely. This went against King Edward's advice to ensure the palisade extended down to the beach to offer the Portuguese besiegers protected access to the anchored ships, but given the unpopularity of the expedition, Henry probably calculated it was necessary to deprive the reluctant Portuguese levies of the temptation for an easy retreat to the ships.

Before departure, King Edward had given Henry explicit instructions to take the city by assault within the first week, and that if Tangier had not fallen after one week, the Portuguese expeditionary force was to withdraw and winter in Ceuta and wait until the Spring for further orders. These instructions probably were given in light of the news of the mobilization of the Moroccan armies, knowing that the expeditionary force was inadequate to take on such an army in the field. There were also concerns about the lingering anchored fleet braving the worsening weather in the Straits of Gibraltar at this time of year. Henry would ignore these instructions.

=== First assault (September 20) ===
On September 20 (according to Ruy de Pina), Henry ordered the first assault on the city, attacking five points at the same time, with Henry personally leading one of the assault teams. However, it quickly failed – the scaling ladders were too few and, as it turns out, too short, to reach the top of the walls. The assaulters had to withdraw. Portuguese casualties amounted to some 20 dead and 500 wounded.

The artillery had proven too weak to do much damage. In the wake of the assault, Henry ordered larger ordnance cannon to be shipped in from Ceuta. It took at least another week before they arrived, eating up precious time that the Portuguese could ill-afford.

Back in Ceuta, the illness of governor Pedro de Menezes had taken a turn for the worse. With Henry's permission, Duarte de Menezes rushed back to receive his father's blessing on his deathbed before he expired on September 22. It was probably Duarte de Menezes who organized the forwarding of the artillery and supplies to Tangier and who was back at the siege shortly.

=== First relief army (September 30) ===
Soon after the first assault, the first Moroccan relief troops arrived in Tangiers. A column of 300 elite Portuguese knights were sent to intercept them, but they were swiftly swept aside. Some 50 Portuguese knights were reduced, and the rest barely escaped. The death of several leading nobles caused some consternation in the Portuguese camp.

On September 30, a larger Moroccan army appeared over the hills of Tangier. The Portuguese chroniclers, with probable exaggeration, claim it was composed of 10,000 horsemen and 90,000 foot Henry moved his army to a hillside, offering battle, but the Marinids just held their position in the valley. After three motionless hours, Henry ordered the Portuguese to march against them and force the issue, but the Marinids just retreated back up the hills, evidently wishing to hold the higher ground. Seeing their motion, Henry called off the attack, and returned with his troops back to the siege lines. The next day (October 1), much the same maneuvers were repeated, with the same results.

On October 3, the dynamic changed slightly: The Moroccan army began a threatening march towards the siege lines. Henry quickly arrayed his troops in two lines. The Marinids then suddenly halted. Henry seized the initiative and sent his stronger left wing, under Alvaro Vaz de Almada and Duarte de Menezes, to take a height on the Moroccan flank, and ordered his first line forward. Seeing the flanking maneuver, the Marinids began to retreat. At that moment, the Tangier garrison burst out in a sortie against the siege camp, which was being held by a reserve force under Diogo Lopes de Sousa. Evidently, the Marinids had hoped Henry's line would break back to rescue the camp, but Sousa's reserves successfully repelled the sally by themselves. The height taken and the Portuguese line advancing unabated, the Marinids called a retreat and broke the engagement.

The Portuguese counted this encounter as a victory. Soldiers reported seeing the vision of a white cross appear in the sky that very evening.

=== Second assault (October 5) ===
Their morale restored, the Portuguese decided to proceed with a new assault on the city. Their scaling ladders were now extended, a new siege tower had been built and the two larger ordnance cannons shipped in from Ceuta were doing serious damage on the gates and walls of the city. On October 5, Henry ordered the second assault. Henry led the assault force, leaving the rest of the troops under Ferdinand the Holy, Ferdinand of Arraiolos and Bishop Álvaro of Evora, to defend their flanks and keep the Moroccan relief army at bay, but the second assault failed as badly as the first. The city's defenders rushed to the critical points, and poured on rapid and heavy missile fire. The Portuguese assaulters were prevented from reaching the walls (only one ladder managed to be set up – and was promptly destroyed).

== Moroccan turnaround ==
=== Second relief army (October 9) ===
On October 9, Henry was preparing his third assault when he received intelligence of a new massive Moroccan relief army – reported (with doubtless exaggeration) to be some 6,000 horse and 7,000 foot. This army was led by Abu Zakariya Yahya al-Wattasi (Lazeraque), the vizier of the Marinid sultan Abd al-Haqq II of Fez (whom the chroniclers suggest was present). The chroniclers report the army was composed of "many kings" (Fez, Marrakesh, Sijilmassa, Velez, etc.). The Tangier relief campaign was probably the first time since 1419 that a unified army from all of Morocco had been assembled.

Prince Henry realized the Portuguese were hopelessly outnumbered, that the siege was lost and the best they could do was to fight an orderly rearguard action back to the ships. All the seamen were ordered to prepare sail, and the army was arrayed to defend a retreat of the assault force to the fortified siege camp lines. The marshal Coutinho was given command of the artillery, the admiral Almada took the infantry, and Henry took command of the cavalry.

The arriving Moroccan army did not pause but attacked at once. The Portuguese advance posts quickly were overwhelmed, and the way to the city cleared. The Marinids then charged the Portuguese forces. The artillery batteries were overrun and taken. The Moroccan charge then turned on Henry's cavalry – which broke and beat a retreat to the siege camp line. Henry's horse was killed from under him, effectively disabling his ability to survey the field and organize the retreat. It is said that Henry was alone on foot for a while, surrounded by Moroccan cavalry, and saved only by the heroics and personal sacrifice of Fernão Alvares Cabral and a group of his guards who rushed in to extract him.

The retreat nearly turned into a rout when about 1,000 of the Portuguese soldiers, nobles among them, abandoned the siege line and fled in panic to the beach to make for the ships. It was only by the furious fighting of those remaining on the palisade that the Moroccan army did not manage to overwhelm and take the siege camp that day. The battle was broken by evening. The Moroccan army encircled and settled to a siege of the Portuguese siege camp.

=== Siege of the Portuguese camp ===
Overnight, the Portuguese besiegers, now besieged, set about repairing and strengthening the defenses of the siege camp. The next day, the Marinids launched another assault on the siege camp, but were repelled after a heavy four-hour fight.

Chronicler Frei João Álvares reports that at this point, the Portuguese expeditionary force in the siege camp was a mere 3,000, implying that of the original 7,000 who arrived at Tangier, 4,000 or so had died or deserted.

The Portuguese camp was certainly in a desperate situation, with only a day or so worth of food left. When these ran out, Henry resolved on a night operation to breach the Moroccan lines and force his army's passage to the beach and the idling ships. However, this operation was detected before it even began (Pina says it was revealed by the treason of Henry's own chaplain, Martim Vieira, who had turned over to the Marinids). The Marinids reinforced the posts guarding the paths to the sea, cutting off all hope of escape for the Portuguese army.

=== Truce and negotiations (October 12) ===
What happened next is a bit more contested. Chronicler Ruy de Pina reports that, on October 12, having taken many casualties, Abu Zakariya called off further assaults on the camp and decided to open communications to the Portuguese defenders, offering to make peace in return for Ceuta. But Frei João Álvares contradicts this, and reports it was the Portuguese who initiated the offer through secret emissaries already on the first day. Álvares reports this offer made no impression on the Marinids at first. It is true the assaults were suspended on October 11, but that was also a Friday, the Muslim holy day (jumu'ah). It was only during this interlude that Abu Zakariya decided to consider the Portuguese offer, and a truce was called for Saturday, October 12.

The talks were conducted by Portuguese emissary Rui Gomes da Silva, alcaide of Campo Maior, and for the Moroccan side, by Salah ibn Salah, emir of Tangier. There was dissent on what terms to offer. Pina suggests that some of the Moroccan commanders, upset at how the negotiations were being conducted on their behalf, withdrew from the truce. The renegades launched an assault on the Portuguese siege camp that Saturday that lasted seven hours.

After that assault, Henry took account of the desperate conditions in the Portuguese camp. The army was starving, horses and beasts of burden were eaten. Thirst also began taking its deadly toll – the siege camp contained but a single small well, sufficient to slake only about one hundred men per day. With so many wounded and weakened, Henry did not have enough men to garrison the full length of the stockade. With the tacit permission of the Moroccan leaders, in an overnight operation on Saturday evening, Henry had his men reduce the circumference of the siege camp (and shift it slightly closer to the sea), allowing the Portuguese to defend themselves more effectively against renegade skirmishers. There were no more assaults on the Portuguese siege camp. The truce was observed from Sunday, October 13 onward.

=== The treaty (October 16–17) ===
The treaty was concluded on Wednesday, October 16, and signed the next day (October 17) by Prince Henry and Salah ibn Salah. The Marinids allowed the Portuguese army to withdraw to their ships unmolested, but they were to leave behind all artillery, weapons, baggage, tents and horses. The Portuguese soldiers were to go empty-handed, taking only the clothes they were wearing. Most crucially, Henry promised to deliver Ceuta to the Marinids – to withdraw the Portuguese garrison and leave behind any and all Moroccan prisoners that were held there. He also committed Portugal to 100 years of peace with Morocco and other Muslim states in North Africa.

To ensure the safe evacuation of Portuguese soldiers to their ships, hostages were swapped – the Tangier governor Salah ibn Salah handed over his son to the Portuguese in return for a group of four noble Portuguese hostages (identified as Pedro de Ataíde, João Gomes de Avelar, Aires da Cunha and Gomes da Cunha). As security for the final fulfillment of the treaty terms, Henry's brother, Ferdinand the Holy Prince, was to remain behind in Morocco, as a hostage of Salah ibn Salah, until Ceuta was delivered. Pina claims that Henry refused this condition, and offered himself in his brother's place, but that the others in his council would not allow it. Upon being delivered to Salah ibn Salah, the noble hostage Prince Ferdinand the Holy and his small entourage of servants, which included the secretary Frei João Álvares, immediately was dispatched under Salah ibn Salah's guard to Asilah.

Portuguese chroniclers report that at the very final stage, some renegade Marinids attacked the embarking Portuguese on the beach – killing an additional forty. However, the skirmish probably was provoked by Portuguese soldiers trying to smuggle some of the forbidden weapons with them. Nonetheless, this beach skirmish later provided the excuse that the Marinids had broken the treaty first, thus rendering it void.

By October 19, the troops were all aboard, and the ships set sail. It is said that the honor of being the last men to leave the beach was shared between the admiral Álvaro Vaz de Almada and the marshal Vasco Fernandes Coutinho. After the embarcation was complete, Henry decided not to release Salah ibn Salah's son (as he was supposed to). As a result, Salah ibn Salah also held on to his four noble hostages, and dispatched them under arms to Asilah.

In all, the siege of Tangiers lasted 37 days – 25 days with the Portuguese besieging Tangiers, 12 days with the Marinids besieging the Portuguese camp. It is said that Portuguese casualties numbered 500 dead and unknown number injured. Moroccan casualties are unknown.

== Alternative timeline ==
The timeline and events proposed above follows that reported by royal chronicler Ruy de Pina. However, Frei João Álvares, who was an eyewitness to the battle, places the dates and events on a somewhat different timeline. Álvares reports that Tangier was assaulted immediately on the first day the expeditionary force arrived (September 13), a second assault within a couple of days (September 14 or September 15). The first attack by a Moroccan relief army is placed on September 16, another the next day (September 17), before the larger set piece encounter in the valley and the sally by the Tangier garrison (September 19). Álvares reports a third failed assault (Pina's second) on Tangier on September 20. The arrival of Abu Zakariya's army and the battle of Tangiers is dated on September 25. The second Moroccan assault on the siege camp on September 26, and the first emissaries sent by the Portuguese to the Marinid camp right after. The seven-hour assault of the siege camp is dated September 28, with the opening of talks in the aftermath. Two more Moroccan assaults (October 1 and October 3) are reported before the truce finally holds. The finalization of the agreement and swapping of the hostages occurs on October 16 and signing of treaty on October 17.

It is worth remarking that both chroniclers seem to agree that one week elapsed between Abu Zakariya's arrival and the truce and opening of talks. Where Álvares differs most significantly is in suggesting that talks dragged out for another two weeks. Unless the Marinids allowed the entry of supplies into the siege camp during that interlude, the conditions in the Portuguese siege camp at the end must have been quite dire.

== Aftermath ==
Prince Henry the Navigator did not return to Lisbon to report to his brother, King Edward of Portugal, but rather sailed directly to Ceuta. Henry assigned D. Fernando de Castro the duty of bringing his troops home and giving the account of the expedition and its defeat. In Ceuta, Henry barricaded himself in his lodgings for several weeks, with hardly a word to anyone – evidently, Henry had fallen into a deep depression. The new Portuguese governor of Ceuta, Fernando de Noronha, who had been appointed to succeed his father-in-law, the late Pedro de Menezes, arrived in Ceuta around this time. He must have been surprised to hear that a treaty had been signed to evacuate the garrison he had just been appointed to command. With Henry ensconced in his room, not speaking to anyone, Noronha was not sure how to proceed.

News soon reached Portugal. A little earlier, sometime in September, the constable John of Reguengos had traveled to the southern province of the Algarve to raise more troops and organize the dispatch of reinforcements and supplies to Henry in Tangier. Being in the south, John was among the first people in the country to hear of the turn-around in Tangier, and the encirclement of the Portuguese camp. John of Reguengos immediately set sail for Africa with all the ships, men and supplies he had at hand. However, strong contrary winds prevented John's flotilla from reaching Tangier. At length, hearing of the capitulation of the Portuguese camp, John changed direction and headed to the Moroccan port of Asilah. There, John entered into frantic negotiations with Salah ibn Salah's officials, hoping to secure the release of his younger brother Ferdinand, but to no avail. John returned to Portugal empty-handed.

King Edward of Portugal received the news of the turn-around on October 19, at his residence in Santarém. Peter of Coimbra, then in Lisbon, received the news around the same time, and immediately set about assembling an armada to rescue his brothers. However, Peter was still in Lisbon when the advance ships of the returning fleet arrived in Lisbon harbor with the news of the Portuguese capitulation and treaty.

After the initial shock, the question of what to do was posed immediately. The quandary would become the anvil of the Ínclita Geração. The princely brothers had been made knights when their father captured Ceuta back in 1415. And they now looked to be undone by it. Peter of Coimbra and John of Reguengos, who had both long argued for abandoning Ceuta, had no doubt on what the course of action should be: fulfill the treaty and evacuate Ceuta. King Edward had enough powers to order it, but was caught in indecision.

After a prolonged silence, Henry eventually dispatched a letter from Ceuta to Edward, arguing against fulfilling the treaty he had signed. Henry noted that the skirmish on the beach exempted the Portuguese from fulfilling the agreement, and proposed instead that perhaps they could swap Salah ibn Salah's son (still being held by Henry) for Prince Ferdinand. However, Edward received a note from the captive Ferdinand at the same time, reporting that the Marinids would accept nothing less than Ceuta, and wondering why it had not been evacuated yet. It is clear from these letters, that, contrary to later legend (propagated by Henry himself), Ferdinand did not seek a martyr's fate, that he expected the treaty to be fulfilled and to be swiftly released.

=== Cortes of Leiria ===
Uncertain of what to do, King Edward of Portugal summoned the Portuguese Cortes to Leiria in January, 1438 for consultation. Henry did not attend the summons, but remained in Ceuta.

The Cortes of Leiria opened on January 25. Before the Cortes, King Edward (via a spokesman) openly blamed Henry's neglect of his military instructions for the debacle at Tangier. But there was no getting away from the fact that Edward had authorized the expedition himself, against the advice of others, including the Cortes itself. A letter from the captive Ferdinand was read before the Cortes. The letter urged the fulfillment of the treaty, expressing Ferdinand's desire to be released and outlining why holding on to Ceuta served Portugal little purpose. Once again, Pedro of Coimbra and John of Reguengos, who had opposed the expedition from the start, urged the Cortes to ratify the treaty and surrender Ceuta immediately. The prelates agreed – although the Archbishop of Braga added that the Pope's approval should also be sought. Most of the burghers also agreed – save for those of the major commercial port cities of Lisbon, Porto and Lagos, who felt that the release of a prince was too small a reward for so important a city, and that perhaps the treaty could be renegotiated. Ultimately, it was the noble magnates that sank the proposal. Rallied by Ferdinand of Arraiolos, the constable who had led the nobles at Tangier (although he earlier opposed the expedition), the Portuguese nobles opposed the swap altogether. Arraiolos argued fervently that reneging the treaty was no dishonor because it had been signed under duress. The Cortes was dissolved without a decision being made.

In June, no longer able to resist his brother's summons, Prince Henry left Ceuta and returned to Portugal, but he requested exemption from presenting himself in the king's court in Evora. King Edward met in him at a private conference in Portel. It was probably there that the decision to hold on to Ceuta was definitively made. Henry proposed alternative schemes to secure Ferdinand's release – ransoming for money, persuading Castile and Aragon to join in a mass release of Muslim prisoners, raising a new army and invading Morocco again, etc. Henry proposed a myriad of schemes to release Ferdinand, but delivering Ceuta was not one of them.

In May, citing six months of foot-dragging, Abu Zakariya Yahya al-Wattasi, vizier of the Marinid palace in Fez, took charge of the noble hostage from Salah ibn Salah, and ordered Ferdinand transferred from his comfortable quarters in Asilah to a common jail in Fez. There, Ferdinand's status was downgraded, and he was subjected to humiliating ordeals by his captors, including being kept in chains for prolonged periods. According to the chronicler Frei João Álvares (who was there with him), Ferdinand bore the humiliations with stoic resilience.

=== Castro Mission, 1440–1441 ===
King Edward of Portugal died in August (of pestilence, said his doctors; of heartbreak over the hapless fate of Ferdinand, said popular lore). Edward's death provoked an internal conflict in Portugal over the regency for his young son, the new king Afonso V of Portugal, and the kingdom became distracted. At length, the upper hand was gained by Edward's brother, Peter of Coimbra, who became regent of Portugal in 1439.

The fulfillment of the treaty was among the new regent's first orders of business. Peter of Coimbra immediately dispatched two emissaries, Martim Tavora and Gomes Eanes, to Asilah to negotiate the logistics of the swap of Ceuta for Ferdinand. In theory, Ferdinand was Salah ibn Salah's hostage, even though he was de facto in Fez, in the custody of Abu Zakariya. Salah recently died and his brother (whom the chroniclers call Muley Buquer – Abu Bakr?) had succeeded him as governor of Tangier and Asilah (Salah's son was then still in Portuguese captivity). It was Muley Buquer who put the preliminary conditions for the swap – firstly, that the Ceuta governor Fernando de Noronha must be relieved from office (his reputation was such that the Marinids believed he would contrive to prevent the swap), and that upon fulfillment of that, Muley Buquer would request from Abu Zakariya the transfer of Ferdinand from Fez back to Asilah. How exactly it would proceed from there is unclear, but presumably the swap would follow.

Receiving the report, Peter of Coimbra appointed D. Fernando de Castro (the head of Henry's household and an experienced diplomat) in charge of the operation. In April 1440 (sometimes dated as 1441), Castro set out with a Portuguese flotilla to Ceuta, to take over the city from the governor Fernando de Noronha, and begin the evacuation of the Portuguese garrison and the handover to the Marinids. In the meantime, the embassy of Martim de Tavora and Gomes Eanes was to return to Asilah to receive the released Prince Ferdinand from the Marinids.

The operation started out inauspiciously. The flotilla went out in a celebratory mood – the ambitious Fernando de Castro openly fantasized that the released Infante Ferdinand might be persuaded to marry his own daughter on the spot, and prepared a rich and well-stocked expedition, packing the ships with banquet finery, an entourage of notables, and a bodyguard of some 1,200 troops, but on the outward journey, around Cape Saint Vincent, the Portuguese flotilla was ambushed by Genoese pirates. The lead ship was boarded and Fernando de Castro killed before the other ships could reach him. The pirates scampered away (suspicions that Noronha may have had a hand in directing the Genoese pirates to sabotage the mission have not been ruled out). Hearing the news, Peter of Coimbra hurriedly dispatched instructions to Castro's son, Álvaro de Castro, to take over his father's credentials and fulfill the mission.

In the meantime, Tavora and Eanes arrived in Asilah. The elder Castro's death led to a little confusion, but once it was clarified that Noronha was relieved, the transfer request was forwarded by Muley Buquer to Fez. Tavora and Eanes sent their own representative, a Portuguese Jew known only as Mestre José (Master Joseph), to accompany the request and presumably escort Ferdinand back to Asilah. Arriving in Fez in May, the emissaries presented the vizier Abu Zakariya with sealed letters from Peter of Coimbra confirming Noronha's dismissal and a copy of the royal instructions given to Castro to evacuate Ceuta. However, Abu Zakariya refused to assent to the transfer request. Instead, the vizier replied that Ferdinand would remain in Fez and that he would fulfill the swap once Ceuta was evacuated. What followed is a bit murky. Master Joseph was accused (and confessed to) being part of a scheme to help Ferdinand escape, and was arrested and thrown into a cell. The detention of Master Joseph (which lasted until September) gave Abu Zakariya time to assemble a Moroccan army for a triumphal march to Ceuta, intending to garrison the citadel as soon as it was evacuated. Abu Zakariaya set out in processional array from Fez, taking Ferdinand along with him, promising to hand him over as soon as he took possession of the city. Master Joseph was released and sent back to Asilah to report the change of plans to Tavora and Eanes. It is uncertain what else the emissary reported about Abu Zakariya's intentions, but the Portuguese ambassadors rejected the offer, arguing they were not prepared to "hock Ceuta for paper promises", that they needed to have some sort of hold on Ferdinand's person. Abu Zakariya called off the march and returned to Fez.

(Reports of the mobilization of Moroccan arms for the march to Ceuta caused alarm in Portugal, which feared that Abu Zakariya might try to take Ceuta by force. In late 1440, an armed Portuguese fleet was hurriedly dispatched to reinforce Ceuta. It is uncertain if they actually arrived there, but if they did, the disembarkation of fresh troops likely sent mixed signals to Fez about Portuguese intentions.)

Negotiations resumed, this time swirling around potential hostage-swapping and material guarantees to supplement verbal promises. However, there was little trust between the parties. The Portuguese failure to fulfill the treaty promptly in 1437, and Henry's failure to return Salah ibn Salah's son after the evacuation from the beach, essentially undermined any new Portuguese offers. Abu Zakariya knew that Ferdinand was his only trump, that he was the only reason the Portuguese negotiators were there (and barely so). Abu Zakariya would not, could not, release Ferdinand until Ceuta was safely in his hands. On the other hand, back in Ceuta, the young and inexperienced Álvaro de Castro, surrounded by suspicious captains and veteran soldiers, could not simply hand over the entire city to the Marinids for anything less than Ferdinand.

In late October-early November, the Nasrid sultan Muhammad IX of Granada stepped in and offered to break the impasse. He proposed that Ferdinand be placed in the hands of a group of Genoese merchants under his protection, giving his solemn promise to Abu Zakariya he would not allow them to hand Ferdinand over to the Portuguese until the evacuation of the city was confirmed. The Portuguese did not give an immediate reply to Granada's offer, and an outbreak of pestilence in Morocco delayed matters further. Three of the noble beach hostages, then being held in Asilah (separately from Ferdinand in Fez), João Gomes de Avelar, Pedro de Ataíde and Aires da Cunha, died of the plague at this time. By September, disappointing news arrived of the breakdown of Granada's offer and Ferdinand was once again chained.

=== Death of the prince ===
Whatever hope remained for a peaceful solution was dashed in March 1442. According to Álvares, that month, a certain Moroccan noble (identified by Álvares as Faquyamar, a tutor of a Marinid prince) was arrested by Abu Zakariya's men, and on his person were found several Portuguese letters, originating from Queen Eleanor's council, outlining a hare-brained scheme to break Ferdinand out of jail. The Moroccan noble was flogged and executed in Ferdinand's presence, and Ferdinand moved to isolation in a dank dungeon in Fez.

It was now clear to Abu Zakariya that the Portuguese had no intention to yield Ceuta, that nothing remained to do with Ferdinand but to extract the largest cash ransom that he could get, but nothing came of this. After 15 months of captivity in the worst conditions, Ferdinand died on June 5, 1443, aged 41. Several of the remaining members of Ferdinand's entourage, including the secretary Frei João Álvares, were ransomed back to Portugal in subsequent years.

In his official chronicle, Ruy de Pina makes no mention of the noble or the escape plan, and suggests the negotiations broke down simply because Abu Zakariya had little interest in recovering Ceuta, that the Portuguese presence in Ceuta served Abu Zakariya as a useful political distraction for the Moroccan population, allowing the Wattasid vizier to consolidate his power domestically.

== Legacy ==
=== Portugal ===
The debacle at Tangier and the captivity and death of Prince Ferdinand have loomed large in popular Portuguese memory, albeit inconsistently. It was a tremendous blow to the reputation of Prince Henry the Navigator. However, Henry managed to deflect attention from his role by encouraging the popular saintly cult of Ferdinand as a national martyr, a 'Saint Prince' or 'Holy Prince' (Infante Santo, although he was never beatified by the Catholic Church) who 'voluntarily' submitted to scourge and death for Portugal's imperial mission rather than a victim of Henry's military pretensions and blunders. Henry commissioned Frei João Álvares to compose the chronicle of Ferdinand's imprisonment as a piece of Christian hagiography (although Álvares does not quite endorse the Henrican interpretation of events). Nonetheless, Henry's interpretation gained currency in later years, particularly as Henry's reputation ascended retrospectively with the glorification of the Age of Discovery, and the blemish of Tangier needed to be scrubbed.

It was known, from the Leiria Cortes, where blame for the debacle at Tangier lay, and what Ferdinand's hopes had been. Henry's opposition to the fulfillment of the treaty was also well-known. Henry's dubious role in the 1438 regency crisis and the later 1449 Battle of Alfarrobeira fostered a significant popular feeling in Portugal at the time that Henry was something of a dynastic traitor, with a pattern of betraying his brothers for personal gain, for which Tangier and its aftermath were cited as early examples. The Saint Vincent Panels, painted by Nuno Gonçalves around this time, is believed by some art historians to represent such a political statement, a funerary homage to Ferdinand the Holy Prince, pointing an accusatory finger at Henry the Navigator.

=== Morocco ===
The victory of Tangier dramatically changed the political fortunes of the unpopular Abu Zakariya Yahya al-Wattasi, vizier of the Marinid palace of Fez and regent for sultan Abd al-Haqq II. Hailed as a national hero, Abu Zakariya was quick to milk the victory for all it was worth. Any question of surrendering the regency was set aside, regional governors returned to the fold. The chaos and disorder of the last two decades came to an abrupt end, and Morocco enjoyed a bit of a springtime in the aftermath.

The ear of his victory, Abu Zakariya launched the construction of the Zaouia Moulay Idriss II in Fez, a magnificent mausoleum for the recently discovered uncorrupted remains of the Idris II (the sultan who founded the Idrisid dynasty back in 807). But the mausoleum also served unmistakably as a monument to Abu Zakariya and his triumph in Tangier.

Although Abu Zakariya did not recover Ceuta, the victory at Tangier was instrumental in the ascent of the Wattasid viziers and their eventual eclipse of the Marinid sultans in whose name they ruled.

=== Later campaigns ===
Whatever the attitude toward Henry or the objective merits of remaining in Ceuta, the death of Ferdinand certainly sealed Portugal's hold on the city. A high price had been paid for it, and the question of abandoning Ceuta was shelved permanently . In fact, it gave an impetus to new Portuguese expansionism in Morocco, now tinged with an element of revenge. The memory of the Holy Prince was cited by King Afonso V of Portugal in launching the 1458 expedition to seize Tangier – although it was deviated, and ended up seizing Ksar es-Seghir (Alcácer-Ceguer) instead. A third attempt to take Tangier was launched in late 1463, which also failed. Finally, on the fourth attempt, Tangier fell to the Portuguese in August 1471.

== Sources ==
Almost all accounts of the Battle of Tangier rely heavily on two Portuguese chronicles: the official Chronica d'el Rey D. Duarte, written by Ruy de Pina in the 1510s (probably on the basis of drafts originally prepared by Gomes Eanes de Zurara), and the Chronica do Infante Santo D. Fernando written c. 1460 by Frei João Álvares, who personally accompanied the 1437 expedition.

Chronicles:

- Frei João Álvares (c. 1460) Chronica dos feytos, vida, e morte do infante santo D. Fernando, que morreo em Fez, first published 1526, Lisbon. [1730, edition, Fr. Jeronimo dos Ramos, editor, Lisbon: M. Rodrigues. online
- Ruy de Pina (c. 1510) Chronica d'el Rey D. Duarte, first published 1790 in J.F. Correia da Serra, editor, Collecção de livros ineditos de historia portugueza, Vol. 1, Lisbon: Academia das Ciências. [1901 edition, Gabriel Pereira, editor, Lisbon: Escriptorio online
- Ruy de Pina (c. 1510) "Chronica d'el Rey D. Affonso V", first published 1790 in J.F. Correia da Serra, editor, Collecção de livros ineditos de historia portugueza. Lisbon: Academia das Ciências de Lisboa, Vol. 1. (Repr. in 1901 edition, 3 vols, Gabriel Pereira, editor, Lisbon: Escriptorio, online)
- Gomes Eanes de Zurara (1453) Crónica dos feitos notáveis que se passaram na Conquista da Guiné por mandado do Infante D. Henrique or Chronica do descobrimento e conquista da Guiné. [Trans. 1896–99 by C.R. Beazley and E. Prestage, The Chronicle of the Discovery and Conquest of Guinea, London: Halyut, v.1, v.2
- Manuel Lopes de Almeida, Idalino Ferreira da Costa Brochado and Antonio Joaquim Dias Dinis, editors, (1960–1967) Monumenta Henricina, Coimbra. vol. 1 (1143–1411), vol.2 (1411–1421), [vol.3] (1421–1431), vol. 5 (1431–1436), vol. 6 (1437–1439),vol. 7 (Sep 1439–1443), vol. 8 (1443–45)

Secondary:

- Beazley, C.R. (1894) Prince Henry the navigator: the hero of Portugal and of modern discovery, 1394–1460. New York: Putnam online
- Cook, W.F. (1993) "Warfare and Firearms in Fifteenth Century Morocco, 1400–1492", in War & Society, Vol. 11 (2), pp. 25–40 at De Re Militari
- Diffie, Bailey W., and George D. Winius (1977) Foundations of the Portuguese empire, 1415–1580 Minneapolis, MN: University of Minnesota Press
- Elbl, Martin Malcolm (2013) Portuguese Tangier (1471–1662): Colonial Urban Fabric as Cross-Cultural Skeleton Toronto and Peterborough: Baywolf Press, 2013
- Elbl, Martin Malcolm (2013, rel. in 2015) "Contours of Battle: Chronicles, GIS, and Topography—A Spatial Decoding of the Portuguese Siege of Tangier, September to October 1437", in Portuguese Studies Review, Vol. 21, No. 2 (2013) (delayed publication release: November 2015): 1–135.
- Julien, Charles-André, Histoire de l'Afrique du Nord, des origines à 1830, édition originale 1931, réédition Payot, Paris, 1961
- Quintella, Ignacio da Costa (1839–40) Annaes da Marinha Portugueza, 2 vols, Lisbon: Academia Real das Sciencias. vol. 1
- Russell, Peter E. (2000) Prince Henry 'the Navigator': a life New Haven, Conn: Yale University Press.
