= Siege of Ceuta =

Siege of Ceuta may refer to:

- Siege of Ceuta (741)
- Siege of Ceuta (1415)
- Siege of Ceuta (1419)
- Sieges of Ceuta (1694–1727)
- Siege of Ceuta (1790–1791)

== See also ==
- Battle of Ceuta (disambiguation)
