= Fernando de Castro =

Portuguese nobleman

Fernando de Castro (c. 1380 – April 1440 or 1441, off Cape St. Vincent) was a 15th-century Portuguese nobleman, diplomat and military figure. Fernando de Castro was the 1st Lord of Paúl de Boquilobo. He was a member of the royal council of John I of Portugal, and governor of the household of Prince Henry the Navigator.

== Background ==
Dom Fernando de Castro was a member of the powerful House of Castro. He was a younger son of Pedro de Castro, Lord of Cadaval (son of Álvaro Pires de Castro) and Leonor Telo de Meneses (daughter of D. João Afonso Telo, 1st Count of Ourém). Fernando de Castro is described by chronicler Rui de Pina as a man of "noble blood, prudent, of good counsel and good estates".

== Early years ==
Fernando de Castro was a member of the royal council of John I of Portugal, and was appointed by him as governor of the household of Prince Henry the Navigator. He is sometimes designated as Fernando de Castro o Velho ('the old'), to distinguish him from his younger cousin and namesake, Fernando de Castro o Moço ('the boy') or o Cegonho ('the stork'), who became governor of the household of Prince Ferdinand the Saint around the same time.

Along with his elder brother D. João de Castro (the next Lord of Cadaval), D. Fernando de Castro participated in the Conquest of Ceuta in 1415. The Castro brothers were said to be the principal officers in charge of the expulsion of the Muslim citizens from the city.

In 1416, Fernando de Castro was dispatched by King John I of Portugal as the Portuguese ambassador to the Council of Constance. In April, 1423, Fernando de Castro headed a Portuguese embassy to the Ávila court of John II of Castile, to witness the long-delayed ratification of the 1411 peace between Portugal and Castile.

== Expedition to Gran Canaria ==
In 1424, sensing that the Crown of Castile was losing interest in the Canary Islands, Prince Henry the Navigator decided to launch an armed expedition to seize the unconquered islands of that archipelago. The large Portuguese expeditionary force, some 2,500 infantry and 120 knights, was placed under the command of Fernando de Castro. It was a fiasco. Landing at Gran Canaria, the expeditionary force faced stiff resistance from the aboriginal Guanches, and were unable to get off the beach. Realizing, too late, that he had not brought along sufficient supplies for so many troops on the beach (water could only be obtained inland), Fernando de Castro decided to cancel the expedition and returned to Portugal. Castile lodged a stern protest immediately. There would not be another attempt.

Despite his connection with the Canaries enterprise, in 1432, Fernando de Castro was sent to Castile again on another diplomatic mission – this time, to witness the ratification of the 1431 peace treaty. In February 1432, John I granted Fernando de Castro the bailiwick (sesmaria) of Paul de Trava (near Santarém). In 1434, he swapped that benefice for the lordship of Paúl de Boquilobo (near Golegã). Fernando de Castro was also lord of Ançã, São Lourenço do Bairro and alcaide-mor of Covilhã. It was around this time (1434) that Fernando de Castro also served as regedor in the Casa do Cível (lower court of appeals) in Lisbon.

== Tangier and after ==
D. Fernando de Castro participated in the ill-fated 1437 expedition to Tangier, led by Prince Henry the Navigator. As governor of Prince Henry's household, Fernando de Castro led the company of knights and squires of Henry's household, taking along his own sons Álvaro de Castro and Henrique de Castro. At the siege of Tangier, Fernando de Castro commanded the right wing of the Portuguese expeditionary force. The siege ended disastrously. In October 1437, the armies of Marinid Morocco trapped the Portuguese expeditionary force in their siege camp, and starved it to submission. In order to preserve his army from destruction, Henry the Navigator negotiated a treaty to restore Ceuta to Morocco, handing over his own brother, Ferdinand the Saint Prince to the Marinids as a hostage, until the terms were fulfilled. Fernando de Castro was placed in charge of bringing the defeated troops to Portugal, while Henry the Navigator went off to Ceuta.

As it turns out, the Portuguese Cortes refused to ratify the treaty, preferring to retain Ceuta and leave Ferdinand in Moroccan captivity. But around 1440, disregarding the Cortes, the new Portuguese regent Peter of Coimbra decided to fulfill the treaty nonetheless, and swap Ceuta for his imprisoned brother. He placed Fernando de Castro, his most experienced diplomat, in charge of the operation. Castro was to lead a flotilla to Ceuta and demand the city from its governor Fernando de Noronha, and make the preparations for the evacuation of the Portuguese garrison and the handover of the city to the Marinids. In the meantime, an embassy under Gomes Eanes and Martim de Távora was to proceed to Asilah to receive the released Ferdinand from the strongman Abu Zakariya Yahya al-Wattasi, governor of the Marinid palace of Fez (called Lazeraque by the Portuguese chroniclers).

It is said that Fernando de Castro openly fantasized that the released Infante Ferdinand might marry his own daughter, and prepared a rich and well-stocked expedition, packing the ships with banquet finery, an entourage of notables, and a bodyguard of some 1200 troops. Castro's flotilla set out from Lisbon in April 1440 or 1441 (the exact date is disputed). But upon turning around the Cape St. Vincent, the lead ship, carrying Castro, was intercepted and overpowered by Genoese corsairs. Fernando de Castro was killed in the scuffle with the pirates, who plundered his ship and scampered off before it could be rescued by the other ships of the fleet. There is some suspicion that Noronha (who was known to be firmly against the swap) may have had a role in directing the pirates.

The Portuguese fleet put in at Tavira and buried Fernando de Castro in the local Franciscan cloister. Hearing the news of the Castro's death, Peter of Coimbra instructed Fernando de Castro's son Álvaro de Castro, to take over his father's credentials and fulfil the mission in Ceuta. As it turns, out the negotiations with Abu Zakariya failed, and Ceuta was not evacuated. Ferdinand the Saint would die in Moroccan captivity in 1443.

== Descendancy ==
D. Fernando de Castro married twice.

- first marriage (c. 1415) to Isabel de Ataíde (daughter of Martim Gonçalves de Ataíde, alcaide-mór of Chaves), produced:
1. D. Álvaro de Castro, 1st Count of Monsanto
2. D. Henrique de Castro, Prior of Crato
3. D. Garcia de Castro, 2nd Lord of Paúl de Boquilobo
4. D. Maria de Castro, married Álvaro de Sousa, Lord of Miranda, alcaide-mór of Arronches and mordomo-mor of Afonso V of Portugal
5. D. Isabel de Castro, married Duarte de Menezes, 3rd Count of Viana
6. D. Catarina de Castro, married D. Álvaro Vaz de Almada, 1st Count of Avranches, later remarried her first cousin D. Martinho de Ataíde, 2nd Count of Atouguia
- second marriage to Mécia de Sousa produced
1. D. Violente de Castro, Lady of Mafra
2. D.Margarida de Castro, married Jean de Neufchâtel, Lord of Montaigu-Fontenoy, parents of Charles de Neufchâtel-Montaigu, archevêque de Besançon et évêque de Bayeux (1480-1498).
