= Ferdinand the Holy Prince =

Infante of the Kingdom of Portugal (1402–1443)

- Master of Aviz; Lord of Salvaterra de Magos and Atouguia
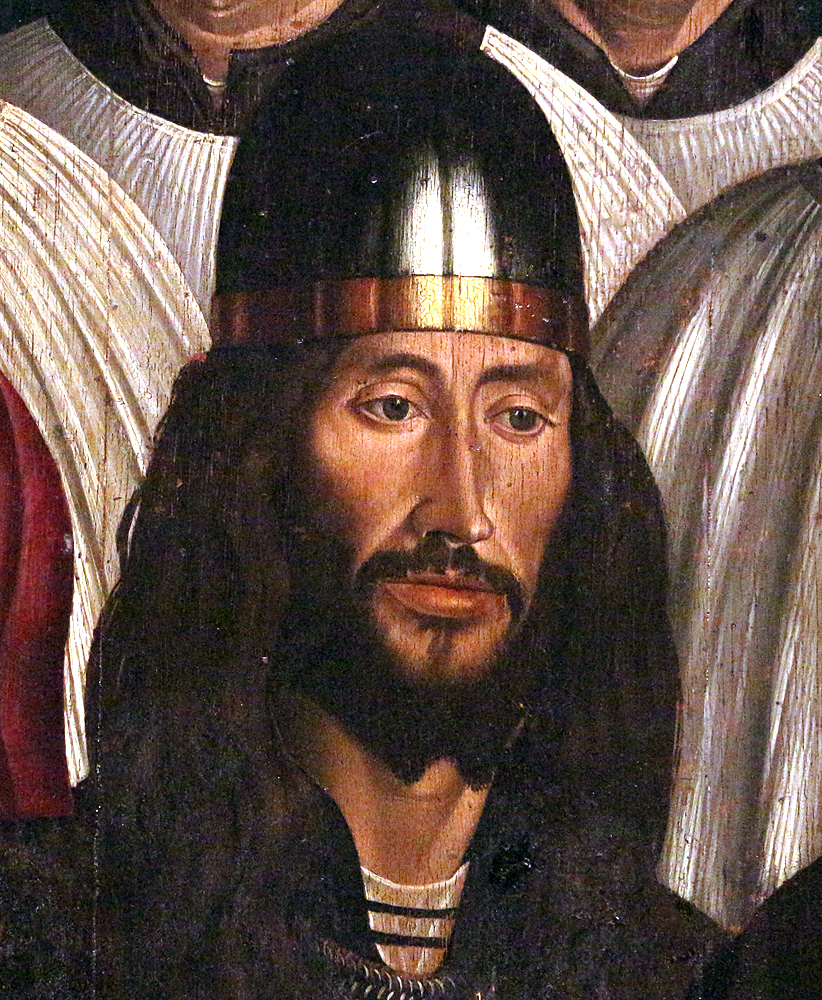
- Detail from the St. Vincent Panels by Nuno Gonçalves, commonly believed to be a portrait of Ferdinand
- Born: 29 September 1402; Santarém, Portugal
- Died: 5 June 1443 (aged 40); Fez, Morocco
- Burial: Batalha Monastery, Portugal
- House: Aviz
- Father: John I of Portugal
- Mother: Philippa of Lancaster

Ferdinand the Holy Prince (Portuguese pronunciation: [fɨɾˈnɐ̃du]; Portuguese: Fernando o Infante Santo; 29 September 1402 – 5 June 1443), sometimes called the "Saint Prince" or the "Constant Prince", was an infante of the Kingdom of Portugal. He was the youngest of the "Illustrious Generation" of 15th-century Portuguese princes of the House of Aviz, and served as lay administrator of the Knightly Order of Aviz.

In 1437, Ferdinand participated in the disastrous Siege of Tangier led by his older brother Henry the Navigator. In the aftermath, Ferdinand was handed over to the Marinid rulers of Morocco as a hostage for the surrender of Ceuta in accordance with the terms of a treaty negotiated between the rulers of Portugal and Morocco by Henry. At first, Ferdinand was held in relative comfort as a noble hostage in Asilah, but when it became apparent that the Portuguese authorities had no intention of giving up Ceuta, Ferdinand's status was downgraded; he was transferred to a prison in Fez, where he was subjected to much harsher incarceration conditions by his jailers. Negotiations for his release continued intermittently for years, but they came to naught, and Ferdinand eventually died in captivity in Fez on 5 June 1443.

A popular cult quickly developed in Portugal around the figure of "the Holy Prince" (O Infante Santo), strongly encouraged by the House of Aviz. Ferdinand remains a "popular saint" by Portuguese tradition, neither beatified nor canonized by the Catholic Church.

== Early life ==
Ferdinand was the sixth surviving child and youngest son of King John I of Portugal and his wife Philippa of Lancaster. Ferdinand and his brothers Edward of Portugal, Peter of Coimbra, Henry the Navigator and John of Reguengos, plus sister Isabella of Burgundy and half-brother Afonso of Barcelos, constitute what Portuguese historians have traditionally labelled the 'illustrious generation' (Ínclita Geração).

Ferdinand was born in Santarém on 29 September 1402, the feast day of St. Michael, a saint to whom he would remain affectionately attached. He had a complicated birth and would remain a sickly child throughout much of his youth. Relatively sheltered because of his illnesses, Ferdinand had a quiet and very pious upbringing, a favorite of his English mother, from whom he acquired a preference for the Sarum Rite of Salisbury in the religious liturgy of masses he attended.

== Master of Aviz ==
Coat of arms of Ferdinand the Holy Prince. His knightly motto was le bien me plait.

Ferdinand was too young to participate in the 1415 Conquest of Ceuta led by his father, John I, in which his older brothers distinguished themselves and were knighted. As the youngest of many sons, Ferdinand did not obtain a substantial endowment from his father, only the Lordship of Salvaterra de Magos and a lifetime grant of Atouguia in 1429.

In 1434, after the death of his father and the administrator João Rodrigues de Sequeira, Ferdinand was appointed lay administrator of the Knightly Order of Aviz by his brother King Edward of Portugal. Ferdinand was also offered the titular office of cardinal by Pope Eugene IV, but turned it down. Despite his piety, Ferdinand had no intention of pursuing a clerical career.

== Siege of Tangier ==
In 1436, dissatisfied with his meager domains, Ferdinand asked his brother King Edward for permission to go abroad to seek his fortune in the service of a foreign king (reportedly, Henry VI of England). Ferdinand's request prompted the reluctant Edward to endorse a plan, long promoted by his brother Henry the Navigator, to launch a new Portuguese campaign of conquest against Marinid Morocco. As a bachelor, Ferdinand made out a will naming Edward's second son, the Infante Ferdinand (future Duke of Viseu) as his heir before departing.

In August 1437, the Portuguese expeditionary force, under the leadership of Henry the Navigator, set out to seize Tangier. Ferdinand brought his household and Aviz knights with him, choosing as his personal banner an emblazoned image of the Archangel St. Michael. The Tangier campaign proved to be a disastrous fiasco. Henry impetuously launched a series of assaults on the walls of Tangier with no success, while allowing his siege camp to be encircled by a Moroccan army rushed north by the Wattasid strongman Abu Zakariya Yahya al-Wattasi, governor of the Marinid palace of Fez (called Lazeraque by the Portuguese chroniclers). The Portuguese besiegers, now besieged and unable to break out, were starved into submission.

To preserve his army from destruction, Henry the Navigator signed a treaty in October 1437 with the Moroccan commanders. It called for the restoration of Ceuta (which had been captured by the Portuguese back in 1415) in return for allowing to his army to withdraw intact (albeit with their weapons left behind). By the terms of the treaty, Henry handed his younger brother Ferdinand over to the Moroccans as a hostage for the delivery of Ceuta. It was later reported that Henry personally volunteered to go as hostage instead of Ferdinand, but that his war council forbade it.

== Hostage in Asilah ==
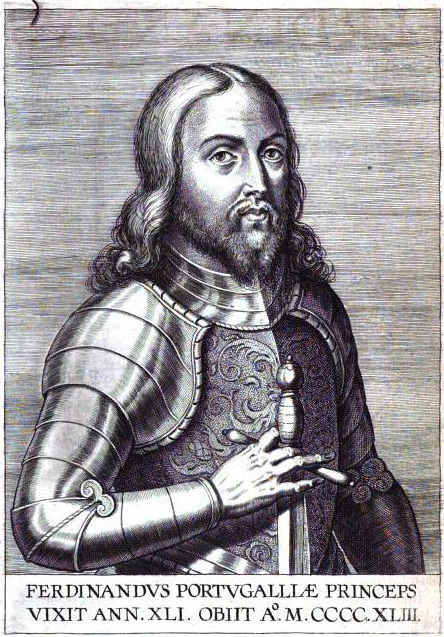
1621 portrait of Ferdinand the Holy Prince in armor (from Antonio Vasconcellos's Anacephalaeoses).

Ferdinand was formally a hostage of Salah ibn Salah (called Çallabençalla in the Portuguese chronicles), the Marinid governor of Tangier and Asilah (and lord claimant of Ceuta). Ferdinand was allowed to bring along a private entourage of eleven household servants into captivity with him. This included his secretary (and future chronicler) Frei João Álvares; his household governor Rodrigo Esteves; his wardrobe keeper Fernão Gil; his confessor, Frei Gil Mendes; his physician mestre Martinho (son of the late chronicler Fernão Lopes); his chaplain Pero Vasques; his head cook João Vasques; his chamberlain João Rodrigues (described as a collaço, meaning a foster-brother or close confidante of Ferdinand); his quartermaster (aposentador) João Lourenço; his hearth-keeper João de Luna; and his pantry keeper (homen de reposta) Cristóvão de Luviça Alemão. Álvares was entrusted with Ferdinand's money purse, estimated to be carrying some 6,000 reals for expenses. They were joined by an additional set of four Portuguese noble hostages identified as Pedro de Ataíde, João Gomes de Avelar, Aires da Cunha and Gomes da Cunha/Silva. The first three were knights of Ferdinand's household, the last a knight of Aviz. These four were not part of Ferdinand's entourage, but part of a separate temporary hostage swap to ensure the smooth embarkation of the defeated Portuguese troops back to their ships, for which Salah ibn Salah gave his own eldest son as hostage to the Portuguese in return. These were meant to be released once the troops were boarded, whereas Ferdinand and his entourage were only to be released upon the evacuation and handover of Ceuta.

Ferdinand, his entourage and the four knights were handed over to Salah ibn Salah on the evening of 16 October 1437 by the Portuguese negotiator Rui Gomes da Silva (alcaide of Campo Maior), who then received the son of Salah ibn Salah in return. The hostages stayed in a tower inside Tangiers while the troops evacuated the beach. But the embarcation did not go smoothly. Discipline broke down and a skirmish broke out on the beach, apparently provoked when some of the Portuguese soldiers were caught smuggling forbidden items. After the troops were all embarked (19 or 21 October 19), Henry the Navigator refused to release his own temporary hostage, the eldest son of Salah ibn Salah, cut the moorings and sailed off. As a result, the four noble hostages were now stranded in Moroccan captivity. Hearing of the beach skirmish and receiving no communication from Henry, Ferdinand was beside himself in tears, fearing that his brother had been among those killed. Ibn Salah sent a few men to investigate the bodies to assure him that Henry was not among them, and when that was insufficient to comfort the prince, Ibn Salah even sent a messenger to Ceuta to try get written assurance from Henry himself.

Ferdinand, the entourage and the four knights left Tangier on 22 October and made their way under Moroccan guard to Asilah (Arzila), thirty miles down the coast from Tangier. The Portuguese hostages were jeered by Moroccan crowds as they made their way. Upon arrival, Ferdinand and his entourage were kept in relatively comfortable quarters in Asilah, as would befit a royal hostage. He was allowed to write and receive correspondence from Portugal, interact with the local Christian community and had dealings with local Genoese merchants. The entourage was also allowed to celebrate Christian mass daily. Fellow-prisoner Frei João Álvares reports Ferdinand expected that the treaty would be promptly fulfilled – that Ceuta would be evacuated and handed over and that they would soon be released. Salah ibn Salah also expected to hear of the evacuation of Ceuta in a matter of days.

Back in Portugal, the news of the defeat at Tangier and the subsequent treaty were received with shock. John of Reguengos immediately set sail for Asilah, hoping to negotiate Ferdinand's release in return for Salah ibn Salah's son (still being held hostage by Henry), but to no avail. The question of what to do divided Ferdinand's older brothers. Ceuta was highly symbolic – the brothers had been made knights there when their father conquered the city back in 1415. Peter of Coimbra, who had been adamantly opposed to the whole Tangier expedition to begin with, urged their eldest brother, King Edward of Portugal, to fulfill the treaty immediately, order the evacuation of Ceuta and secure Ferdinand's release. But Edward was caught in indecision. Henry the Navigator, who stayed in Ceuta, depressed and in seclusion after the defeat in Tangier, eventually dispatched letters to Edward counseling against ratifying the treaty he had himself negotiated and suggesting other ways of getting Ferdinand released without surrendering Ceuta. But Ferdinand himself wrote letters to Edward and Henry from Asilah noting that the Marinids were not likely to release him for anything less than Ceuta, urging them to fulfill the treaty and wondering what the delay was.

In January 1438, still undecided, Edward of Portugal convened the Portuguese Cortes in Leiria for consultation. Ferdinand's letters were read before the Cortes, wherein Ferdinand expressed his desire to be released, and noted that Ceuta did not serve Portugal any strategic purpose and should be abandoned regardless. Contrary to later legend, it is clear from these letters that Ferdinand did not seek out a martyr's fate, that he wanted Ceuta to be handed over to the Marinids according to the terms of the treaty and that he wanted to be released swiftly. At the Cortes, urged by Peter and John, the burghers and clergy voted largely for the swap, but the nobles, rallied by Ferdinand of Arraiolos, argued strongly against it, with the result that the Cortes were dissolved without a decision being made. The decision to keep Ceuta was only made in June 1438, after a conference in Portel between Edward and Henry the Navigator. Henry once again urged a repudiation of the treaty and proposed alternative schemes to secure Ferdinand's release, e.g., ransoming him for money, persuading Castile and Aragon to join in a mass release of Muslim prisoners in exchange, raising a new army and invading Morocco all over again, etc. After repeated entreaties from Ferdinand, Henry finally dispatched a message to his imprisoned brother giving his reasons for not fulfilling the treaty: firstly, that Henry had not had the royal authority to make such a treaty to begin with, and secondly, because of the beach skirmish at Tangier, Henry considered the treaty had already been violated and thus he was under no legal obligation to honor it.

== Prisoner in Fez ==
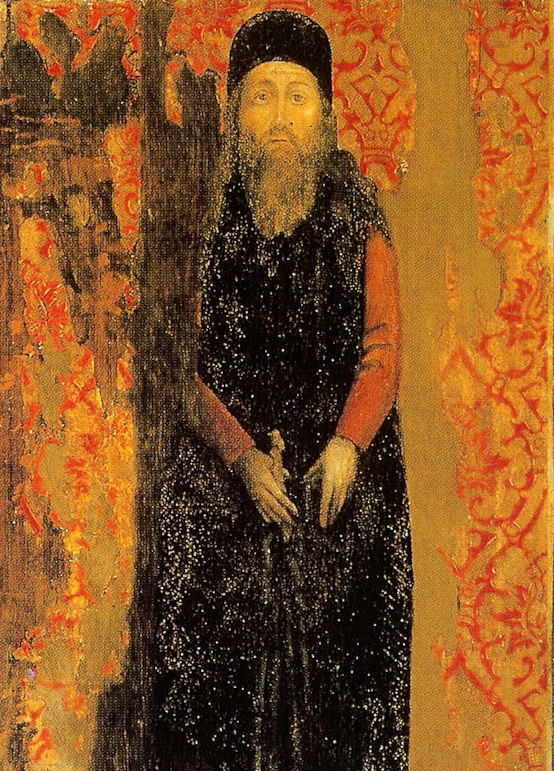
Ferdinand the Holy Prince, from the 1450s triptych in Henry the Navigator's chapel at Batalha Monastery

The Marinid authorities in Morocco were surprised and angered by the Portuguese repudiation of the treaty. Rumors of a plot to land a Portuguese amphibious force to break Ferdinand out of Asilah (a coastal city) prompted a decision to move him inland. On 25 May 1438, Abu Zakariya Yahya al-Wattasi, the powerful vizier of the Marinid palace in Fez, took charge of the hostages from Salah ibn Salah and ordered Ferdinand and his entourage transferred from his comfortable quarters in Asilah to a prison in Fez. Of the original entourage, two did not make the transfer to Fez. Frei Fernão Gil, the confessor, had died in the winter of 1437–38, whereas Rodrigo Esteves, the head of household, fell ill, and Ibn Salah gave him permission to return to Portugal. In the case of Esteves, his son Pedro Rodrigues arrived from Portugal to stand hostage in his father's place. Pedro Rodrigues and the four knightly hostages remained in Asilah, while the others went on to Fez.

Upon arrival in Fez in late May 1438, Ferdinand's entourage was placed in a prison where they met two Portuguese prisoners previously incarcerated: Diogo Delgado and Álvaro Eanes of Alverca. Master Joseph, a Jewish surgeon and emissary of Salah ibn Salah who had accompanied the transfer from Asilah, was sent back by Abu Zakariya with instructions to inform Lisbon of the new circumstances. The entourage (plus the two prior prisoners) were sealed in the prison while awaiting the response. Conditions in Fez were considerably worse than at Asilah. Nonetheless, the two Portuguese prisoners taught the new arrivals how to get better food smuggled in from the city markets and put them in contact with a Majorcan merchant in Fez willing to supply the prince on credit. On 11 October 1438, with no satisfactory reply received from Lisbon, Ferdinand's status was downgraded from treaty hostage to common prisoner. Moroccan guards searched through the cells and confiscated much of their remaining money, contact with the outside was cut off and the Majorcan merchant was flogged for his troubles. The twelve men were shoved into a smaller dungeon built to hold eight, given prison clothing and set on a strict diet of bread and water. It was at this point that Ferdinand and his entourage were first put in leg irons. Fellow-prisoner Álvares reports that although the jailers occasionally threatened beatings and whippings, they never physically harmed Ferdinand or his companions, as they feared that any injury done to their prisoners would diminish their ransom value. Nonetheless, they forced Ferdinand to undertake manual labor that was humiliating and unbefitting a noble prince, e.g. hoeing the palace gardens and cleaning the horse stables. Even so, Álvares reports that Ferdinand was determined to partake in the same fate as his companions, and when they were assigned to the harder prison jobs that Ferdinand had been spared, Ferdinand volunteered to go and labor alongside them (although this was soon forbidden him).

King Edward of Portugal died in September 1438 (of pestilence, said his doctors; of heartbreak over the hapless fate of Ferdinand, said popular lore). Shortly before his death, Edward changed his mind about the abandonment of Ceuta and dispatched an emissary, Fernão de Silva, to inform the Moroccans that the Portuguese would be fulfilling the treaty after all, and to make preparations for the Ferdinand's release. But the death of Edward left Silva stranded in Asilah without credentials. Having come so close to being freed, the news (which arrived in Fez in November 1438) came as a double blow to Ferdinand, who promptly fell into despair. Nonetheless, Abu Zakariya ordered the leg irons taken off in the expectation that a deal might yet be struck with the new regime in Lisbon.

The new state of affairs took some time to sort out – Edward's death provoked an internal conflict in Portugal over the regency for his young son, the new king Afonso V of Portugal. At length, the upper hand was gained by Edward's brother, Peter of Coimbra, who finally became regent of Portugal in early 1439. In May 1439, Ibn Salah and Abu Zakariya finally received a missive from the new regency council that they intended to fulfill the terms of the treaty concerning Ceuta. But matters took another strange turn when Salah ibn Salah and Abu Zakariya bickered for control of the prisoner. In October 1439, a Jewish emissary from Ibn Salah (probably Master Joseph again) arrived in Fez intending to take Ferdinand and his entourage back to Asilah, but Abu Zakariya sent him away, saying he intended to continue holding on to the prisoner in Fez until the Portuguese sent someone with higher credentials who was empowered to undertake the surrender of Ceuta. As soon as the emissary left, Ferdinand and his entourage were clapped back in leg irons, stripped of nearly all clothes and kept permanently locked up in their dungeon, day and night. These new harsh measure were possibly precautionary rather than punitive to prevent any attempt by Ibn Salah's agents from trying to abscond with the valuable prisoner. In December, the prisoners (Ferdinand and his chaplain, Pero Vasques, excepted) were taken out of their permanent confinement to undertake hard road repair work in Fez.

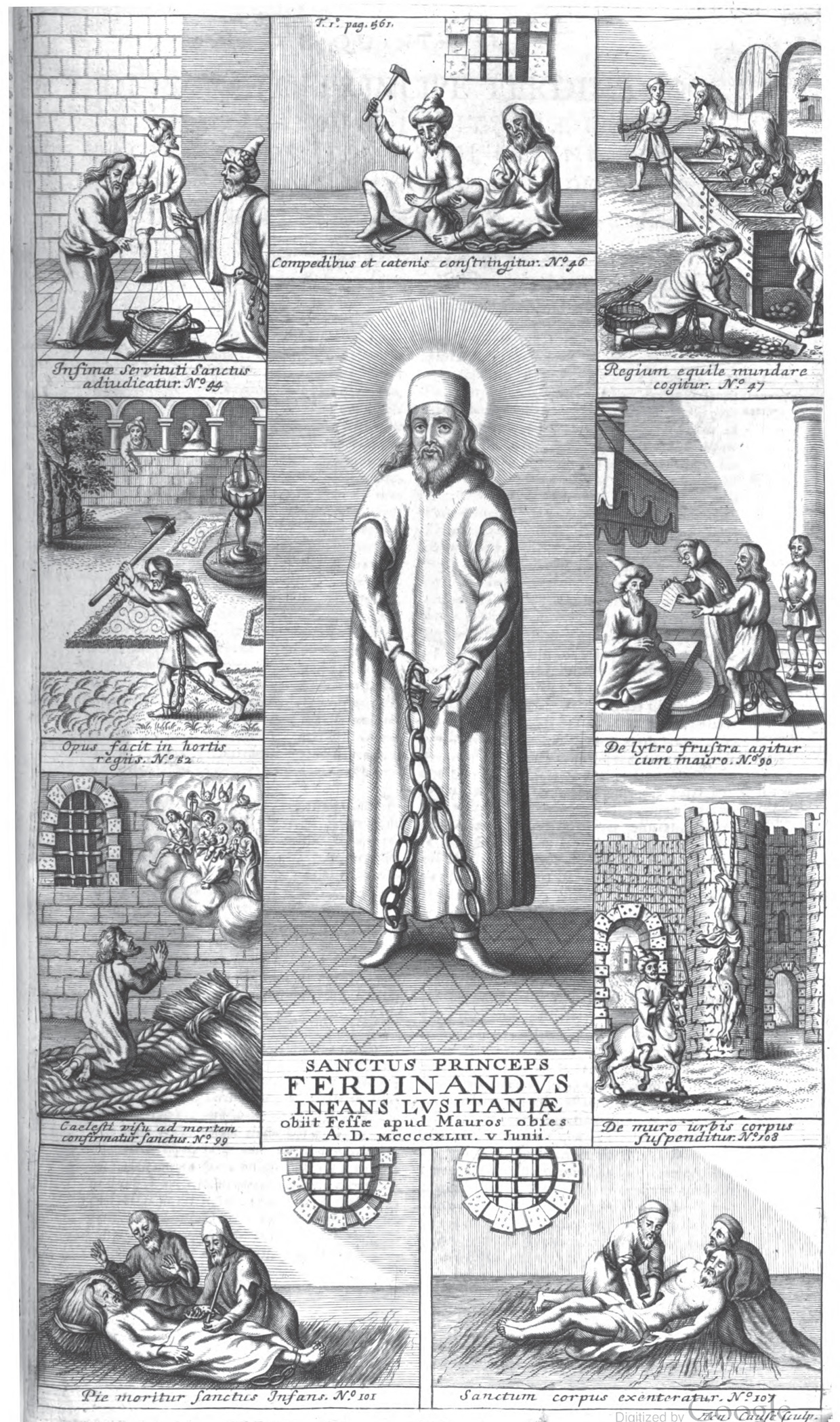
Scenes from Ferdinand's captivity and death in Fez (from the Bollandist's Acta Sanctorum, 1695). The only known depiction of Ferdinand with a saint's halo.

When the road work was finished in February 1440, the companions were assigned to new work in the palace gardens and carpentry and masonry shops. However, things had taken another twist in the interim; Salah ibn Salah had died over the winter of 1439–40. As his eldest son was still in Portuguese captivity, the government of Asilah-Tangier (and notional control of Ferdinand) was passed to his brother Abu Bakr (known in the chronicles as Muley Bubuquer). Álvares reports that Abu Zakariya tried to lay claim on Ibn Salah's lands, provoking a quarrel with Abu Bakr. In turn, Abu Bakr conspired with a certain "Faquy Amar", who as tutor to a Marinid prince had access to the palace of Fez, to break Ferdinand out of prison. But Abu Zakariya got wind of the plot, and Faquy Amar fled the city. Things got more confusing when Gonçalo de Sintra, an agent of Henry the Navigator, arrived in Salé and told the Marinid authorities there that the Portuguese intended only to provide cash, not Ceuta, for Ferdinand. This caused the Marinids to accuse the Portuguese of double-dealing and reneging on their earlier offer. A letter finally arrived from the dowager-queen Eleanor, but it only pertained to some minor matter relating to the transfer of some lands back in Portugal and made no mention of the Ceuta swap. Each of these incidents infuriated the Marinids, who felt the Portuguese were being false and toying with them, and their anger fell harshly on Ferdinand, who was threatened and subjected to tighter conditions of confinement. Even the sympathy of the Marinid sultan Abd al-Haqq II and his wives – who had previously mitigated Abu Zakariya's harshness, and gently treated the prince, occasionally inviting him to eat with them in the palace gardens – was now alienated.

Despite the undermining missteps of his relatives, the regent Peter of Coimbra was determined to undertake the swap, and he dispatched two emissaries, Martim Tavora and Gomes Eanes, to Asilah to negotiate the logistics. As a preliminary, Abu Bakr demanded that the governor of Ceuta, Fernando de Noronha, be relieved from office – his reputation was such that the Moroccans believed Noronha would contrive to prevent the swap. Peter had little trouble agreeing to it – the Noronha family, closely allied with the Braganzas, were among Peter's keenest political enemies; indeed, Noronha's brothers had led the conspiracy of nobles which tried to deprive Peter of the regency back in 1438.

In early April 1440, Peter of Coimbra dispatched Fernando de Castro, a notable diplomat, to take over the government of Ceuta from Noronha and undertake the evacuation of the Portuguese garrison. The operation began inauspiciously. Castro's flotilla set out from Lisbon in a celebratory mood; the ambitious Fernando de Castro openly fantasized that, upon release, the Infante Ferdinand might be persuaded to marry his own daughter on the spot, and he prepared a rich and well-stocked expedition, packing the ships with banquet finery, an entourage of notables, and a bodyguard of some 1200 troops. But on the outward journey, around Cape Saint Vincent, the Portuguese flotilla was ambushed by Genoese pirates. The lead ship was boarded and Fernando de Castro killed. The pirates scampered away before the other ships could rescue him. Suspicions have been raised (but no proof) that Fernando de Noronha may have had a hand in directing the pirates against Castro in an effort to sabotage the mission. Ceuta was something of a corsair's nest, Portuguese governors routinely allowed foreign pirates to operate out of it in return for kickbacks and a share of the spoils, so it is almost inconceivable that Genoese pirates would dare attack Castro's fleet without Noronha's knowledge and consent. With the ambassador dead, the fleet put in at Tavira (in the Algarve) and sent an urgent message to Peter to inform him of what had happened. The regent immediately dispatched instructions ordering Castro's son, Álvaro de Castro, to take over his father's credentials, proceed to Ceuta and fulfill the mission.

In the meantime, unaware of Castro's fate, Tavora and Eanes arrived in Asilah to inform Abu Bakr of the undertaking. Abu Bakr immediately dispatched Master Joseph to Fez to request and arrange the transfer of Ferdinand and his entourage back to Asilah to be handed over to the Portuguese emissaries. Master Joseph arrived in Fez in May 1440 and presented Abu Zakariya with sealed letters from Peter of Coimbra that contained copies of the order for Noronha's dismissal and the evacuation instructions given to Fernando de Castro. What happened thereafter is murky. Ferdinand himself was called to an audience before Abu Zakariya, with Joseph present, to be asked if he wanted to return to Asilah. While escorting Ferdinand back to his dungeon, Abu Zakariya's guards "found" a secret note on him, which they said Master Joseph had slipped to him during the audience. Master Joseph was accused of a scheming to help Ferdinand escape and was promptly detained. Álvares believes this was all a ruse by Abu Zakariya to gain some time. Abu Zakariya sought to reap the glory of recovering Ceuta and needed time to assemble an army in Fez for a triumphal march on Ceuta. In September 1440, once the army was assembled, Master Joseph was finally released and sent back to Asilah without Ferdinand, carrying only Abu Zakariya's promise to undertake the swap himself, i.e. that he would personally take Ferdinand to Ceuta and release him upon taking control of the city. It is uncertain what else Joseph reported about Abu Zakariya's intentions, but the Portuguese ambassadors rejected the change of plan, arguing that they were not prepared to "hock Ceuta for paper promises" and that they needed to have some sort of hold on Ferdinand's person before the city was delivered.

Abu Zakariya's column had set out from Fez in September 1440, with Ferdinand in tow, but they did not get far. Only now hearing of Castro's death and receiving the vigorous reply from the ambassadors in Asilah, they paused, and after some deliberation, Abu Zakariya called off the march and returned to Fez in October. (Reports of the mobilization of Moroccan arms for the march to Ceuta caused alarm in Portugal. Fearing that Abu Zakariya intended to take Ceuta by force, preparations immediately began to send an armed Portuguese fleet to reinforce Ceuta; it is uncertain if the fleet was actually sent, but news of the preparation of fresh troops would likely have been received in Fez, sending mixed signals about Portuguese intentions.)

Negotiations resumed, this time swirling around potential hostage-swapping and material guarantees to supplement verbal promises. But there was little trust between the parties. In early November, the Nasrid sultan Muhammad IX of Granada stepped in and offered to break the impasse. He proposed that Ferdinand be placed in the hands of a group of Genoese merchants under his jurisdiction, giving his solemn promise to Abu Zakariya that he would not allow them to hand Ferdinand over to the Portuguese until the evacuation of the city was confirmed. The Portuguese did not give an immediate reply to Granada's offer.

An outbreak of pestilence in Morocco in early 1441 delayed matters further. Three of the four noble hostages that had remained in Asilah (separately from Ferdinand in Fez) – João Gomes de Avelar, Pedro de Ataíde and Aires da Cunha – died of the plague at this time. (In a curious note, when the Moroccans asked Ferdinand how Christians dealt with the plague, Ferdinand replied that "they removed themselves from places where people were dying of it", a reply which was reportedly received with derisive laughter.) By September 1441, the disappointing news arrived of the breakdown of Granada's offer, and Ferdinand was once again clapped in leg irons.

Whatever hope remained for a peaceful solution was dashed a few months later in March 1442. According to Álvares, the Moroccan noble Faquy Amar (tutor of a Marinid prince) was arrested that month by Abu Zakariya's men, and on his person were found several Portuguese letters originating from Queen Eleanor's council that outlined a hare-brained scheme to break Ferdinand out of prison. Faquy Amar was brutally flogged in Ferdinand's presence and subsequently executed along with his conspirators. It was now clear to Abu Zakariya that the Portuguese had no intention to yield Ceuta and that nothing remained to do with Ferdinand but to extract the largest cash ransom that he could get. Negotiations ensued with the prisoners. Ferdinand put it out that he might be able to raise a total ransom of 150,000 dubloons (dobras) and the release of 150 Muslim prisoners for the release of himself and his companions.

Ferdinand was subsequently separated from the rest of his entourage. He was moved to a new small dark, windowless cell – more accurately, an empty weapons storeroom in the qasr of Fez, where he could be more closely guarded. Only his physician Master Martinho was allowed to see him. The rest of the entourage remained in the palace dungeon and were assigned to hard labor, principally in the stables and roadwork, but occasionally also in the castle, where they might exchange words with Ferdinand through a crevice in the wall. Abu Zakariya raised his price to 400,000 dubloons and 400 prisoners and asked Ferdinand to inquire of it from his relatives. But the reply from Portugal, which came four months later, said it was far too much, that they could afford 50,000, but offered to dispatch the ambassador Vasco Fernandes to negotiate a comprehensive ransom, which would include the son of Salah ibn Salah, and the pair still being held in Asilah (the surviving Aviz knight Gomes da Silva and Pero Rodrigues, who was the stand-in for his father, Rodrigo Esteves). The reply infuriated Abu Zakariya, particularly the codicil that implied the son of Salah ibn Salah would have a say in the negotiations over Ferdinand. The son of Salah arrived in Fez three months later to open talks, but he was brusquely received and nothing more came of it. Ferdinand was reportedly depressed and exasperated with his relatives; at one point he refused to hear any more news from Portugal. His companions duly kept from him the news of the death of his brother John of Reguengos in 1442.

== Death ==
Ferdinand's isolation in Fez continued. He only met his physician at mealtimes and his chaplain once every two weeks. By bribing the guards, he was sometimes allowed to meet other members of his entourage. He was not assigned to labor like the others, but spent his days largely confined to his cell, praying and writing prayers. After fifteen months in these conditions, Ferdinand fell ill on 1 June 1443 and died a few days later, on 5 June. According to his hagiographers, on the evening before his death, Ferdinand reported seeing a vision of the Virgin Mary, the St. Michael the Archangel and St. John the Evangelist.

After his death, the Fez authorities had Ferdinand's corpse embalmed with salt, myrtle and bay leaves. Ferdinand's heart, organs and intestines were taken out in the process (and promptly acquired by his fellow prisoners, who hid them in clay pots buried underground in a corner of their dungeon). Ferdinand's naked and disemboweled corpse was subsequently hung upside down from the battlements of the walls of Fez for public display. After four days, the body was placed in a sealed wooden coffin and once again hung from the same battlements "for a long time". In his hagiography, Alvares reports several "miracles" subsequently attributed to the coffin.

Ferdinand was unmarried and childless at the time of his death. The lay mastership of his Order of Aviz was passed to his nephew Peter, Constable of Portugal (the son of Peter of Coimbra).

=== Fate of companions ===
Many members of Ferdinand's entourage died in prison in the subsequent years, primarily of disease. Their fates, according to Frei João Álvares, in chronological order, came as follows:

- Frei Gil Mendes, the confessor, died in Asilah in the winter of 1437–38.
- Rodrigo Esteves, head of household, fell ill and was released from Asilah in 1438 in return for his son Pedro Rodrigues
- Diogo Delgado, Portuguese prisoner in Fez, was the first to die in Fez, sometime between 1443 and 1448
- João de Luna, hearth-keeper, died in Fez, 1443–48
- Mestre Martim, the physician, died in Fez, 1443–48.
- Fernão Gil, the wardrobe-keeper, died in Fez, 1443–48.
- João Lourenço, the quartermaster, died in Fez, 1443–48.
- Álvaro Eanes of Alverca, the other Portuguese prisoner in Fez, converted to Islam
- Cristóvão de Luviça Alemão, pantry-keeper, converted to Islam
- Frei João Álvares, the secretary, ransomed by Peter of Coimbra in 1448
- João Vasques the cook, ransomed by Peter of Coimbra or João de Lisboa in 1448.
- João Rodrigues, the collaço, chamberlain, ransomed by Frei João Álvares in 1450
- Pero Vasques, the chaplain, ransomed by Frei João Álvares in 1450

Of the hostages that remained in Asilah, these were their fates:

- João Gomes de Avelar, noble knight of Fernando's house, died of plague in early 1441.
- Aires da Cunha, household knight, died of plague, late 1441.
- Pedro de Ataíde, household knight, died of plague, late 1441
- Gomes da Cunha/Silva, Aviz knight, commendador of Noudar, survived up to 1442, fate uncertain thereafter.
- Pedro Rodrigues, son and stand-in for his father Rodrigo Esteves, survived up to 1442, fate uncertain thereafter.

== Saintly cult ==
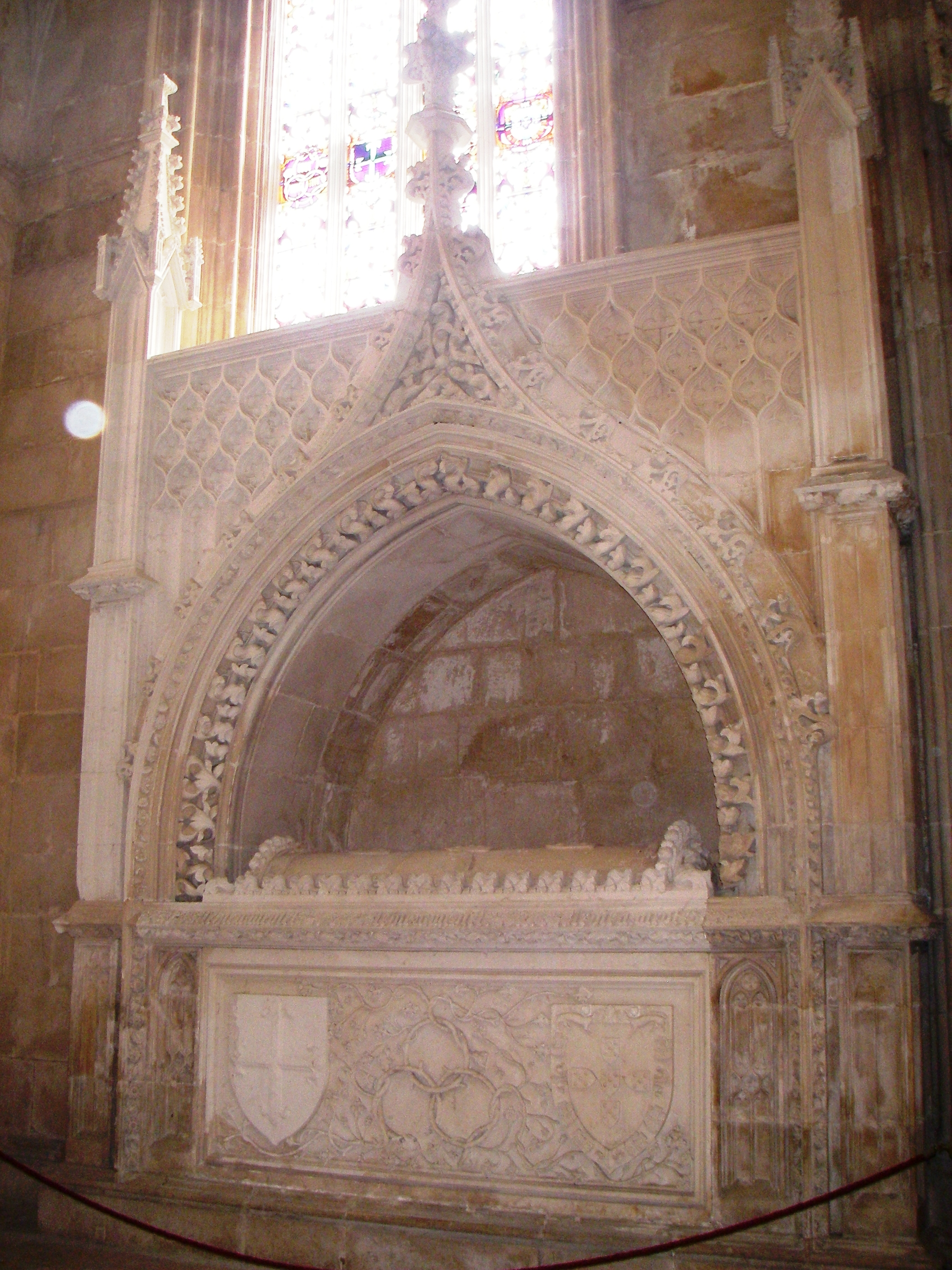
Ferdinand's tomb at House of Aviz necropolis in Batalha Monastery. Set up in 1443, Ferdinand's organs were deposited here in 1451, his bodily remains in 1472–73.

News of Ferdinand's death was met with great mourning in Portugal. The regent Peter of Coimbra, who had perhaps done the most to get Ferdinand released, ransomed some of the imprisoned members of his party, notably Ferdinand's secretary, Frei João Álvares, in 1448. Shortly after arriving in Lisbon, Álvares returned to Morocco in 1450 to ransom the remaining prisoners. Álvares also had hoped to ransom Ferdinand's remains, but he only managed to recover the hidden pot with Ferdinand's entrails. He returned to Lisbon and made his way to the court of King Afonso V of Portugal in Santarém in early June 1451. Frei João Álvares and João Rodrigues were instructed to take the relics and deposit them in the prepared tomb reserved for Ferdinand in the Aviz necropolis, the Founder's Chapel in Batalha Monastery. Álvares reports that on the way to Batalha, they passed through Tomar, where Prince Henry the Navigator joined the procession and subsequently led the religious ceremony depositing the relics at Batalha. The tomb was originally carved with Ferdinand's personal arms and knightly motto le bien me plet ("Good pleases me"), which combined the motto of his father, por bem, with that of his mother, il me plait.

A popular saintly cult soon developed around the figure of Ferdinand, encouraged by the ruling House of Aviz. In January 1444, Peter of Coimbra endowed a fund for a yearly mass to be said in Ferdinand's honor at his chapel in Batalha. Henry the Navigator commissioned a triptych of the life and sufferings of Ferdinand, painted by João Áfonso, to be set up in his own (Henry's) chapel. Some modern authors believe the celebrated Saint Vincent Panels by Nuno Gonçalves were commissioned by Peter of Coimbra as a funerary homage to Ferdinand the Holy Prince.

The religious iconography of Ferdinand the Holy Prince usually portrays him as a miserable prisoner, hungry, bearded, disheveled in a black cloak and hood, his feet in leg irons and chains held in his hands. He also sometimes holds a hoe, for his labors in the palace gardens in Fez. Later on, Ferdinand was sometimes depicted in the armor of an imperial warrior.

The promotion of the saintly cult, in particular the narrative twist that Ferdinand had "volunteered" for martyrdom rather than allow Ceuta to be surrendered, was principally due to Henry the Navigator and may have been motivated by an attempt to deflect responsibility for his death away from himself. In the 1450s, Henry commissioned Frei João Álvares to set down the details of Ferdinand's life and captivity. Finished sometime before 1460, and first published in 1527, the Álvares chronicle is the principal source of the life and travails of Ferdinand. Although originally intended as a piece of Christian hagiography to supplement the cult of the "Holy Prince" and the Henrican interpretation, the Álvares chronicle did not flatter Henry's leadership nor absolve him of responsibility for Ferdinand's fate. He makes it reasonably clear that Ferdinand did not seek out a martyr's fate, but had it imposed on him by the delays and machinations back in Portugal. At several points, Álvares surreptitiously points an accusatory finger at Ferdinand's brothers via speeches from the mouth of Ferdinand, his companions and his captors. Another hagiography, the Martirium pariter et gesta, written by an unknown author, appeared around the same time or shortly after. Some have speculated the Martirium might have been written by Pero Vasques, the ransomed chaplain, although others believe it was a largely derivative piece, hurriedly written by someone else, commissioned by Isabella of Burgundy to support the campaign in Rome to promote Ferdinand to sainthood.

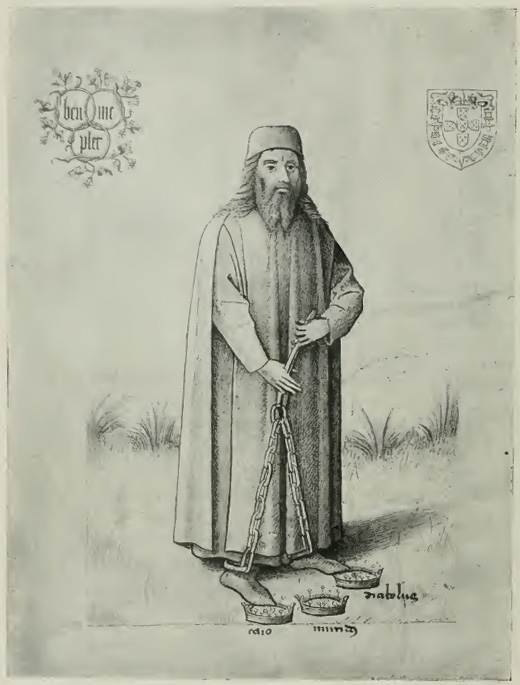
Ferdinand the Holy Prince, from the Martirium pariter et gesta (Vat. Lat. Codex 3634)

Ferdinand's sister Isabella of Portugal, Duchess of Burgundy, endowed a mass to be said in Brussels, and in 1467 decided to fund a chapel dedicated to Ferdinand the Holy Prince at the Church of St. Anthony in Lisbon. To this end, Isabella dispatched Frei João Álvares to Rome to petition the pope for religious honors for her brother, possibly even beatification, the first step to formal sainthood. At Álvares's request, bulls were issued by Pope Paul II in 1470 granting permission for the Lisbon chapel and indulgences to anyone who attended an anniversary mass for Ferdinand. Although a contract was signed between Álvares and Lisbon municipal authorities in November 1471 to begin the chapel, the death of both Paul II and Isabella around this time probably prevented the campaign from going forward, with the result that Ferdinand remained unbeatified and uncanonized.

King Afonso V of Portugal is reported to have invoked the memory of the martyrdom of his uncle in his three Moroccan campaigns of 1458, 1463/4 and 1471. In the last campaign, the conquest of Asilah, Afonso finally captured Tangier. In the aftermath, negotiations were opened between Afonso and the Moroccan strongman Muhammad al-Sheikh to deliver the bones and bodily remains of Ferdinand, which were still in Fez. These negotiations dragged on for a while, but the remains were finally obtained by the Portuguese in 1473 (or perhaps 1472) One version relates that a disgruntled Moroccan courtier, said to be the ruler's own nephew, seized the coffin containing Ferdinand's body, smuggled it out of Fez, and brought it all the way to Lisbon to sell to the Portuguese king for a considerable sum. There were subsequently great ceremonies in depositing the bodily remains in Ferdinand's tomb in Batalha.

The cult of Ferdinand continued into the 16th and 17th centuries. King Manuel I of Portugal had the sculptor Nicolau Chanterene sculpt a statue of Ferdinand on the left side of the magnificent western door of the Jerónimos Monastery c. 1517. In 1538–39, in accordance with an endowment of the late dowager-queen Eleanor of Viseu (the widow of John II) a retable was commissioned depicting the life and sufferings of Ferdinand, painted by Cristóvão de Rodrigues, to be set up in Ferdinand's chapel at Batalha (alas this retable has long since disappeared).

The saintly cult of the Ferdinand the Holy Prince fell foul of the ever-stricter rules of the Catholic Church, which sought to discourage cults of unbeatified and uncanonized persons. The only clear evidence of the presence of the Ferdinand cult inside a regular church outside the Batalha chapel was the retable dedicated to Ferdinand set up at the church of Our Lady of the Olive Grove in Guimarães in 1472, in celebration of the imminent translation of the relics. In 1614, Martim Afonso Meixa, Bishop of Leiria, prohibited the Ferdinand cult at Batalha on account of his not being beatified. Nonetheless, the 1595 hagiography by Jerónimo Román and the 1623 history written by Frei Luís de Sousa tried to encourage it, suggesting masses for Ferdinand the Holy could be carried out subsumed in masses for All Saints. Jorge Cardoso included him in his Agiológio Lusitano (1666). The 1634 papal encyclical Coelestis Hierusalem issued by Pope Urban VIII prohibited popular cults of unbeatified and uncanonized persons "unless they proved to be of time immemorial". The Bollandists used this clause to insert Ferdinand the Holy Prince in the "June 5th" entry of their Acta Sanctorum in 1695, controversially including a rare image of him with a halo.

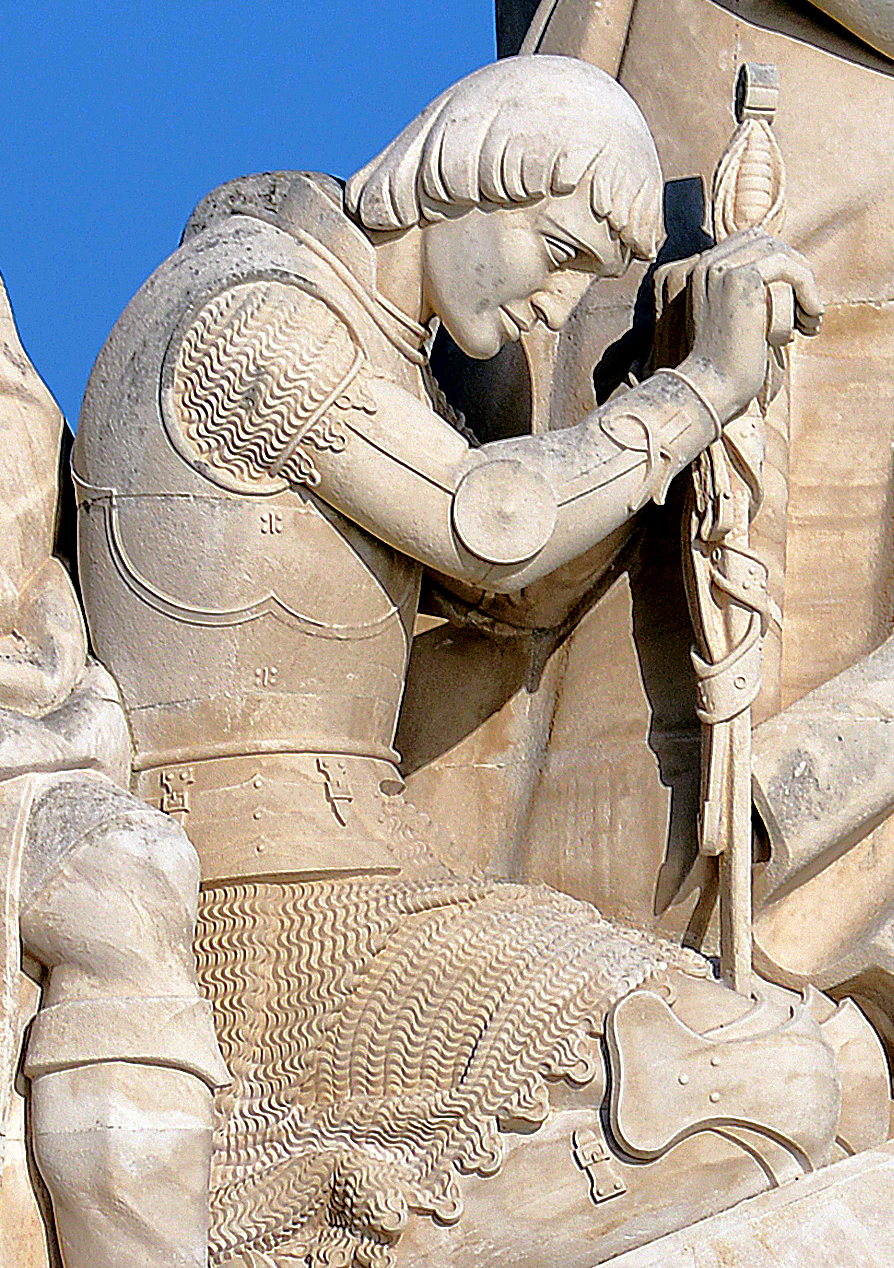
Effigy of Ferdinand the Holy Prince in the Monument of the Discoveries, in Lisbon, Portugal.

Restrictions on the religious cult did not prevent the continuation of a secular cult of Ferdinand, connected to the narrative that Ferdinand was a voluntary martyr for Portugal's imperial mission. The Portuguese poet Luís de Camões made a brief mention of Ferdinand in his epic 1572 poem Os Lusíadas (Canto IV, stanzas 52–53), asserting Ferdinand had given himself to martyrdom voluntarily for patriotic reasons, "a sacrifice to love of country made, that not for him strong Ceuta be o'erthrown, the public weal preferring to his own." Perhaps surprisingly, the Fernandine legend got another gust of wind after the 1580 Iberian Union with Spain. The Spanish playwright Francisco Agustín Tárrega composed a drama La Fortuna Adversa del Infante D. Fernando de Portugal in 1595–98 (sometimes attributed to Lope de Vega), which was probably the basis for the more famous 1629 Baroque play El príncipe constante by Calderón.

Fortunato de São Boaventura, the exiled Archbishop of Evora published a more modern version of Ferdinand's story in 1836. In English, the story of Ferdinand the Holy Prince was told in an 1842 poem "The Steadfast Prince" by Richard Chenevix Trench The story was also turned into a 19th-century pulp historical fiction novel, The Constant Prince, by Christabel Rose Coleridge.

The Ferdinand legend received another lift in the 20th century, particularly encouraged by the Portuguese Estado Novo, which was keen on cultivating icons of nationalism and overseas glory. Ferdinand the Holy Prince was given a position of prominence on the Padrão dos Descobrimentos, a monument erected in 1960 to celebrate the Age of Discovery and (more generally) the Portuguese Empire.
