= Joseph de Agulló i Pinos =

- Marques de Gironella
- Born: 1670s Barcelona, Spain
- Died: 1704; Ceuta
- Occupation: Military; Government

Joseph de Agulló - Pinos (c. 1670–1704) was a Catalan nobleman, Lord and Marquess of Gironella.

== Biography ==
In 1702 Joseph de Agulló was appointed Governor and Captain general of Ceuta. General Agulló, crushed the resistance of the Moors, who he overcame in a battle which occurred at Ceuta on May 18, 1703, with the command of 1500 men of infantry and 160 horses. His wife was María Francisca de Sagarriga y de Lapuente Marquise of Gironella.
