= Abu Said Uthman III =

Marinid Sultan (r. 1398–1420)

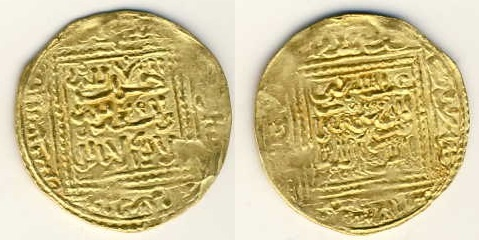
- Coin of Abu Said Uthman III

Marinid Sultan
- Reign: 19 March 1398 – 21 October 1420
- Predecessor: Abu Amir Abdallah ibn Ahmad
- Successor: Abdalhaqq II
- Born: 1383
- Died: 21 October 1420 (aged 36–37)
- Issue: Abd al-Haqq II
Names
- Abu Said Uthman ibn Abi l-Abbas ibn Abi Salim
- Dynasty: Marinid
- Religion: Islam

Abu Said Uthman III (Arabic: أبو سعيد عثمان ثالث المريني) (Abu Said Uthman ibn Abi l-Abbas ibn Abi Salim), (1383 – 21 October 1420) was Marinid sultan from 19 March 1398 to 1420, the last effective ruler of that dynasty. He ascended to the throne at the age of sixteen. He succeeded his brother, Abu Amir Abdallah ibn Ahmad. His forces were involved in an unsuccessful attempt to acquire Gibraltar from the Emirate of Granada in 1410. In 1415 the Portuguese seized the port of Ceuta. Abu Said Uthman III failed in an attempt to recover Ceuta, and was shortly after assassinated. His vizier gained control of the kingdom, establishing the Wattasid dynasty rulers.

== Reign ==
=== Siege of Gibraltar ===
The garrison of Gibraltar rebelled in 1410 against the Granadan ruler, Yusuf III, and declared allegiance to Abu Said Uthman III. Abu Said Uthman III sent his brother, Abu Said, to take charge with an army numbering some 1,000 cavalry and 2,000 infantry. They occupied a number of castles in the area as well as the ports of Estepona and Marbella. A Granadan counter-offensive in 1411 drove Abu Said back to Gibraltar, where he took refuge. Yusuf III's son Ahmad laid siege to Gibraltar and defeated several Moroccan attempts to break out. Eventually a Granadan sympathizer in the garrison helped the besiegers to gain entrance. They stormed the Moorish Castle, forcing Abu Said to surrender, and restored Granadan control over Gibraltar.

Back in Morocco, Abu Said Uthman III reacted by writing to Yusuf III to ask him to execute Abu Said for disloyalty. Instead, the Granadan sultan gave Abu Said an army and sent him back to Morocco to launch an ultimately unsuccessful rebellion against Abu Said Uthman III.

=== Portuguese invasion of Ceuta ===
In 1415 King John I of Portugal seized Ceuta. This conquest marked the beginning of overseas European expansion. The Portuguese capture of Ceuta in 1415 had taken the Moroccans by surprise. In 1419 Abu Said Uthman III led an army to recover it, but his siege of Ceuta failed. The besieging forces included those of Abu Said Uthman III and allied forces from the Emirate of Granada. The Portuguese garrison of Ceuta was led by Pedro de Menezes, 1st Count of Vila Real. The Portuguese gathered a fleet under the command of princes Henry the Navigator and John of Reguengos to relieve Ceuta. According to the chroniclers, the relief fleet turned out to be quite unnecessary. In a bold gambit, D. Pedro de Menezes led the Portuguese garrison in a sally against the Marinid siege camp and forced the lifting of the siege before the relief fleet even arrived.

=== Assassination and succession ===
The failure to recapture Ceuta led to widespread disaffection with the sultan and instability in the Marinid state. This culminated in a coup in Fez in 1420, in which the sultan Abu Said Uthman III was assassinated, leaving behind only a one-year-old child, Abu Muhammad Abd al-Haqq II as son and heir. A succession struggle broke out immediately as other pretenders quickly emerged. Opportunistically, the Nasrid rulers of Granada and the Abdalwadids of the Kingdom of Tlemcen intervened, each sponsoring different candidates for the Moroccan throne.

At the time, Abu Zakariya Yahya al-Wattasi was serving as the long-time governor of Salé for the Marinids. Hearing the news of the sultan's assassination, Abu Zakariya hurried from Salé and seized control of the royal palace of Fez, proclaiming the orphan child Abd al-Haqq as the new Marinid sultan and appointing himself his regent and chief minister (vizier). Morocco quickly descended into disorder and strife. Granadan and Tlemcen interventions and intrigues continued, regional governors seized control of their districts, selling and re-selling their allegiance to the highest bidder, Sufi-inspired religious radicals drummed up mobs to seize control of urban centers and take to the field, while rowdy rural nomads, the Hilalian Bedouin tribesmen, availed themselves of the general breakdown of law and order to launch a series of bandit raids on smaller towns and settlements. However, the vizier Abu Zakariya Yahya al-Wattasi eventually gained control, becoming the effective ruler of Morocco, founder of the Wattasid dynasty of viziers and later sultans.
