= Battle of Ceuta =

Battle of Ceuta may refer to:

- Battle of Ceuta (1144), a naval battle between the Kingdom of Sicily and the Almoravid Empire in Ceuta
- Battle of Ceuta (1309), a battle between Aragon and Granada in Ceuta in 1309
- Battle of Ceuta (1341), a naval engagement that took place off Ceuta during the Reconquista
- Portuguese conquest of Ceuta, the Portuguese capture of Ceuta from Morocco in 1415

== See also ==
- Siege of Ceuta (disambiguation)
