= Abu Zakariya Yahya al-Wattasi =

Wattasid vizier of the Marinid sultan of Fez (died 1448)

Abū Zakarīyā' Yaḥyā ben Ziyān al-Waṭṭāsī (Arabic: أبو زكرياء يحيى بن زيان الوطاس; died 1448) was a vizier of the Marinid sultan of Fez, regent and effective strongman ruler of Morocco from 1420 until 1448. He is the founder of the Wattasid dynasty of viziers and later sultans, and as such often designated as Yahya I in Wattasid lists. He was also known by his nickname Lazeraque (the wall-eyed), as found in Portuguese chronicles.

The Wattasids (or Banu Wattas) were a Moroccan Berber clan related to the Marinid sultans of Morocco. They were traditionally established in the Rif, holding the citadel of Tazuta as their base.

The Portuguese capture of Ceuta in 1415 had taken the Moroccans by surprise. In 1418, the Marinid sultan Abu Said Uthman III of Morocco led an army to recover it, but the siege failed. This led to widespread disaffection with the sultan and instability in the Marinid state. This culminated in a coup in Fez in 1420 (sometimes dated 1419), in which the sultan Abu Said Uthman III was assassinated, leaving behind only a one-year-old child, Abu Muhammad Abd al-Haqq II as son and heir, supported by Abu Zakariya. A succession struggle broke out immediately as other pretenders quickly emerged. Opportunistically, the Nasrid rulers of Granada and the Abdalwadids of Tlemcen intervened, each sponsoring different candidates for the Moroccan throne.

At the time, Abu Zakariya Yahya al-Wattasi was serving as the long-time governor of Salé for the Marinids. Hearing the news of the sultan's assassination, Abu Zakariya hurried from Salé and seized control of the royal palace of Fez, proclaiming the orphan child Abd al-Haqq as the new Marinid sultan and appointing himself his regent and chief minister (vizier). Abu Zakariya's intervention had been facilitated by the old Marinid palace bureaucracy, who feared the other candidates would deliver Morocco to foreign domination.

But the writ of Abu Zakariya did not extend much beyond the palace. Refusing to recognize the Wattasid minister, Morocco quickly descended into disorder and strife. Granadan and Tlemcen interventions and intrigues continued, regional governors seized control of their districts, selling and re-selling their allegiance to the highest bidder, Sufi-inspired religious radicals drummed up mobs to seize control of urban centers and take to the field, while rowdy rural nomads, the Hilalian Bedouin tribesmen, availed themselves of the general breakdown of law and order to launch a series of bandit raids on smaller towns and settlements. With Morocco in disorder, pressure on the Portuguese in Ceuta was lifted, (save for the occasional makeshift puritan column that marched up to the walls of Ceuta to demand a trial of arms). The Portuguese used this respite to entrench themselves firmly in Ceuta.

Anarchy would continue to prevail in Morocco for the next several years, as Abu Zakariya struggled to defeat the string of pretenders and stitch the country back together, in the name of the young Marinid child-sultan.

The Marinid sultan Abd al-Haqq II came of age by 1436, but Abu Zakariya Yahya refused to step down from the regency. Sensing a new political crisis was brewing, the Portuguese thought it an opportune moment to take another bite out of Morocco and began organizing an expedition to seize the Moroccan citadel of Tangier. The Portuguese expeditionary force, personally commanded by Portuguese prince Henry the Navigator, landed in August 1437. But he was unable to take the well-fortified city.

For Abu Zakariya Yahya, the Portuguese attack turned out to be a political opportunity. Appealing for national unity to expel the foreign intruders, forces were dispatched from all corners of Morocco, placing themselves at the disposal of the Wattasid mayor. Abu Zakariya led a massive army to Tangiers, and quickly encircled the Portuguese siege camp by early October 1437. The Portuguese expeditionary force was starved into submission, and, on October 15, Prince Henry agreed to a treaty to deliver Ceuta back to Morocco, in return for being allowed to withdraw his army unmolested.

The victory over the Portuguese at Tangier turned Abu Zakariya from reviled regent to national hero overnight. Sufi activists who had long led the grassroots opposition the regent, now rallied for him. Rivals and regional governors quickly came back under the fold. Any ideas that the Marinid sultan Abd al-Haqq II might have about dismissing his now-popular and powerful minister were shelved. Abu Zakariya was able to cement and extend his power over Morocco.

The astute Abu Zakariya celebrated the triumph by erecting the magnificent shrine of Zaouia Moulay Idriss II in Fez, over the alleged tomb of Idriss II (the founder of the Idrisid dynasty back in 807). The remains of Idris II was long-assumed to be buried with his father Idris I in Moulay Idriss (near Volubilis), but popular belief and reverence had switched when an uncorrupted body was discovered at the new location around 1307. Hoping to tap into the popular Idrisid cult, Abu Zakariya's ensured religious authorities and the living members of the Idrisid family confirmed it. Thus, in a way, the new tomb of Idris II served also as a monument to Abu Zakariya's triumph at Tangier.

In the end, the Portuguese refused to fulfill the treaty, and allowed their hostages, including the royal Ferdinand the Saint Prince, to rot in Moroccan captivity, rather than give up Ceuta. Ferdinand would die in 1443. But this did not diminish Abu Zakariya's new prestige. After the long years of anarchy and disorder, a bit of a springtime prevailed over Morocco after 1437.

Abu Zakariya continued ruling Morocco until his death in 1448. His popularity and power was still strong enough to secure the appointment of his nephew, Ali ibn Yusuf, to succeed him as the new all-powerful Wattasid vizier of Morocco, for the dissolute and increasingly irrelevant Marinid sultan Abd al-Haqq II.

Abu Zakariya's own son, Yahya ibn Abi Zakariya would succeed his cousin as vizier in 1458.

In the Portuguese chronicles of Frei João Álvares and Ruy de Pina, Abu Zakariya is referred to as Lazeraque, a nickname which Álvares explains was "because of his wall-eyes, his proper name was Bazaquary, of the generation called Benvotaçy, by his father related to the Marinids, and by his mother, descended from Christians.". Álvares, who was imprisoned alongside Ferdinand in Fez, impugns Abu Zakariya's personal character mercilessly, a person of 'low' background, who seized power by malice and deception, who brutally broke the Marinid nobility and kept the sultan in thrall, universally feared, but nonetheless disarmed his opponents with the affectation of mildness, piety and courtesy.

== See also ==
- Wattasids

== Sources ==
- Frei João Álvares c.1460, Tratado da vida e dos feitos do muito vertuoso Senhor Infante D. Fernando, first published 1527, Lisbon. Reprinted 1577, Coimbra. 1730 edition retitled Chronica dos feytos, vida, e morte do infante santo D. Fernando, que morreo em Fez, Fr. Jeronimo dos Ramos, editor, Lisbon: M. Rodrigues. online
- Abun-Nasr, J.M. (1987) A History of the Maghrib in the Islamic period. Cambridge University Press.
- Julien, Charles-André Julien, Histoire de l'Afrique du Nord, des origines à 1830, édition originale 1931, réédition 1961, Payot, Paris.
- Kably, Mohamed (1986) Société, pouvoir et religion au Maroc à la fin du 'Moyen Age' (XIVe–XVe siècle), Paris: Maisonneuve et Larose.
- Ruy de Pina(c.1510) "Chronica d'el Rey D. Affonso V", first published 1790 in J.F. Correia da Serra, editor, Collecção de livros ineditos de historia portugueza. Lisbon: Academia das Ciências de Lisboa, Vol. 1. (Repr. in 1901 edition, 3 vols, Gabriel Pereira, editor, Lisbon: Escriptorio, online)
