= Frei João Álvares =

Portuguese friar, chronicler and writer (c.1400-c.1490)

Frei João Álvares (c. 1400 in Torres Novas – c. 1490 in Paço de Sousa) was a 15th-century Portuguese friar of a military Order, chronicler and writer. Álvares served as chamberlain and secretary of the Portuguese royal prince or infante the holy Ferdinand, the youngest of the 'Illustrious Generation' (Portuguese: Ínclita Geração) – the children of King John I and Philippa of Lancaster). He accompanied Ferdinand on the ill-fated Portuguese campaign to conquer Tangier from Marinid Morocco in 1437. To preserve his army from destruction, Prince Henry the Navigator, commander of the expedition, signed a treaty that agreed to deliver Ceuta (captured by the Portuguese earlier in 1415) back to Morocco. Henry handed over his brother Ferdinand to the Marinids as a noble hostage to ensure the delivery of Ceuta. As a member of his household, Álvares accompanied Ferdinand into Moroccan captivity.

As it turns out, the Portuguese refused to honor the treaty and deliver Ceuta, with the result that Ferdinand was left in Marinid captivity, first at Asilah, then at Fez, where he eventually died in 1443. However, Álvares was successfully ransomed in 1448, five years after his master's death. He returned to Morocco in 1450 to ransom remaining captives and to collect the relics of Ferdinand, who was now starting to be religiously cultivated as the Holy Prince (Infante Santo) in Portugal.

After returning to Portugal, Prince Henry commissioned Álvares to draft a chronicle of Ferdinand's life. Written by Álvares between 1451 and 1460 and first published in Lisbon in 1527, it is one of the few eyewitness accounts of the Battle of Tangiers and the captivity of Ferdinand. Its details are often at odds with the account of official royal chronicler Rui de Pina and, despite being commissioned by Henry, often unflattering of Henry's leadership during the Tangier campaign. Intended as Christian hagiography to promote the saintly cult of Ferdinand, Álvares's chronicle details Ferdinand's patient endurance of the humiliations and sufferings he underwent in Moroccan captivity. But Álvares refrains from endorsing the popular view that Ferdinand had volunteered for martyrdom, making it reasonably clear that Ferdinand originally expected the treaty to be honored and his release to be secured swiftly.

Sometime before 1460, Álvares accompanied Isabella of Portugal (Duchess of Burgundy) to Flanders. He is also known to have traveled to Rome in 1470, seeking spiritual indulgences attached to the veneration of Ferdinand.

João Álvares was a member of the military order of the Knights of St. Benedict of Aviz and in 1461 was named commendatory abbot of the Benedictine monastery at Paço de Sousa (near Penafiel in northern Portugal). He translated several religious works into Portuguese, including the first edition of The Imitation of Christ of Thomas à Kempis. He died in Paço de Sousa around 1490.

== Works ==
- c.1460, Tratado da vida e dos feitos do muito vertuoso Senhor Infante D. Fernando, first published 1527, Lisbon. Reprinted 1577, Coimbra. 1730 edition retitled Chronica dos feytos, vida, e morte do infante santo D. Fernando, que morreo em Fez, Fr. Jeronimo dos Ramos, editor, Lisbon: M. Rodrigues. online

== Sources ==
- Frei João Álvares por Joaquim Veríssimo Serrão. Revista HALP n.9 (1999).
- Adelino de Almeida Calado (1964) "Frei João Álvares: estudo textual e literário-cultural", Boletim da Biblioteca da Universidade de Coimbra, vol. 27 offprint
- Russell, P.E. (2000) Prince Henry 'the Navigator': a life New Haven, Conn: Yale University Press.
