= Sieges of Ceuta (1694–1727) =

Blockades of the Spanish enclave of Ceuta by Moroccan forces (1694-1727)

Coordinates: 35°53′18″N 5°18′56″W

- Part of the Spanish–Moroccan conflicts
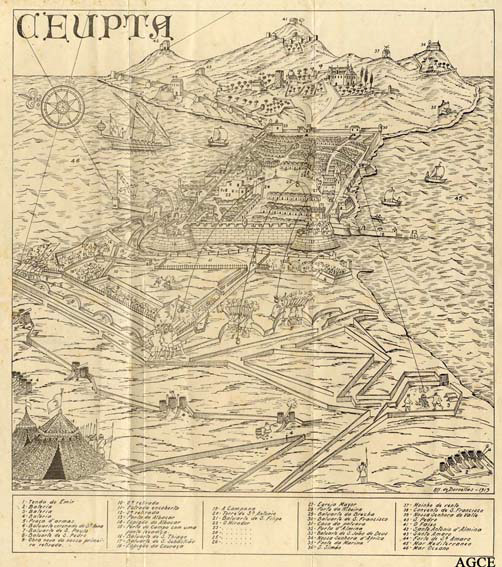
- The city of Ceuta in 1700 during the siege
Date	23 October 1694 – 1720; 1721 – 22 April 1727
Location	Ceuta, North Africa
Result	Spanish victory

Combatants
Spain	Morocco

Commanders and leaders
(Spain) Joseph de Agulló †; (Spain) Marquis of Lede	(Morocco) Ismail Ibn Sharif #; (Morocco) Ali bin Abdallah

Strength
3,000 (1694); 20,000 (1720)	Unknown

The sieges of Ceuta, also known as the thirty-year siege, were a series of blockades by Moroccan forces of the Spanish-held city of Ceuta on the North African coast. The first siege began on 23 October 1694 and finished in 1720 when reinforcements arrived. During the 26 years of the first siege, the city underwent changes leading to the loss of its Portuguese character. While most of the military operations took place around the city walls (Spanish: Murallas Reales), there were also small-scale penetrations by Spanish forces at various points on the Moroccan coast, and the seizure of shipping in the Strait of Gibraltar. The city was placed under a second siege in 1721 until 22 April 1727. The engagements are considered to be the longest siege in history.

== Background ==
Ismail bin Sharif had succeeded in creating a new state able to challenge European powers in North Africa, as well as the Ottoman Empire in present-day Algeria. His forces had captured Mehdya, Tangier, Larache and most recently Asilah in 1692. In 1694 he gave the governor Ali bin Abdallah the task of conquering Ceuta.

== Siege ==
=== The first siege ===
Following the occupation of the open country around Ceuta, the sultan's troops began to construct buildings and cultivate the land to sustain themselves. The governor of Ceuta thereupon asked the Madrid court for help. Troops were sent from Andalusian towns and from Portugal. The arrival of the Portuguese led to friction with the local population. As Ceuta had been in Portuguese hands up to a few decades previously, their intentions were doubted. The presence of these troops was seen as an attempt to exert pressure for a return of Portuguese sovereignty. The Portuguese troops were withdrawn without engaging in combat.

During this period, there were repeated bombardments, gains, and losses of positions around the city walls. In July 1695, during a dense fog – common at Ceuta in summer – the Moroccan troops made a surprise attack on the Spanish during a change of guard. The besiegers captured the central square (Plaza de Armas). Those among the defenders who failed in crossing the drawbridge were killed in battle or when they jumped into the moat in an attempt to escape. A later Spanish counterattack regained the Plaza de Armas.

=== The capture of Gibraltar ===
In 1704, English and Dutch troops conquered Gibraltar. This was a severe blow for Ceuta, as Gibraltar had been on the main supply route from the peninsula. Communications via Tarifa proved to be difficult owing to strong winds in the Strait of Gibraltar; while other nearby Spanish cities were inaccessible due to their involvement in the War of the Spanish Succession.

On 7 August of that year Prince George of Hesse-Darmstadt sent Juan Basset (a Spanish military commander supporting the Habsburg candidate Archduke Charles of Austria as successor to the Spanish throne) to Ceuta with part of the Anglo-Dutch fleet, calling on the city to surrender in the name of the Archduke with the promise that the siege would then be over. The Marquis of Gironella, governor of the city, and the population refused to surrender to the Anglo-Dutch forces. They reinforced the Almina peninsula to prevent any bombardment by the fleet. No Anglo-Dutch attack took place, as the fleet was diverted to confront a Franco-Spanish fleet (Battle of Málaga) which was aiming to retake Gibraltar.

Once Gibraltar was in Anglo-Dutch hands, it became a supply source for the Moroccan besiegers.

=== The arrival of the Marquis of Lede ===
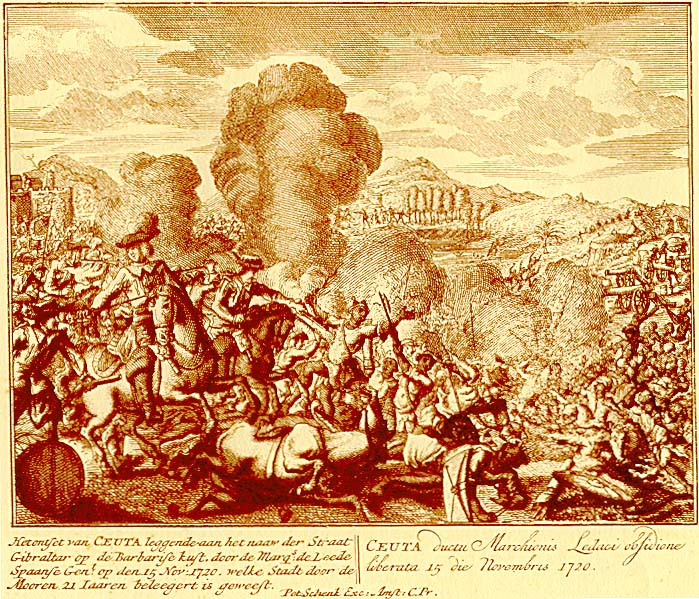
The Marquis of Lede directing the attack on the besiegers.

During the following years, the siege continued with little significant change until the arrival in 1720 of 16,000 soldiers under the command of the Marquis of Lede. These troops were returning from the War of the Quadruple Alliance, which had not achieved the results the Spanish had hoped for. After the loss of all Spanish territory in Italy, Ceuta became a position of strategic importance in the Spanish defensive cordon in the Mediterranean. The Marquis launched a successful expedition against the besiegers, who retreated to Tetuán. However, upon an outbreak of plague a few months later in 1721, the Marquis decided to leave the city, seeing no prospect of capturing Tetuán or Tangier.

=== The second siege ===
After the Marquis had left, the Moroccans immediately took back the initiative. Another siege and several more battles occurred from 1721 until the death of Moulay Ismail in 1727. War for the throne broke out among the sultan's sons. On 22 April, a reconnaissance expedition from Ceuta confirmed that the Moroccans had left.

== Aftermath ==
During the sieges, many buildings were destroyed and had to be rebuilt. The Almina quarter, almost uninhabited until the start of the siege, began to be populated. Another of the most significant consequences was the gradual loss of Portuguese features: the Portuguese language and currency was replaced by the Spanish language and currency. This process was assisted by the departure of several families fleeing from the long siege and by the mainly Andalucian origin of the soldiers sent to defend the city and of others who were attracted to the city by the presence of the large body of troops.
