= Abd al-Haqq II =

Marinid Sultan from 1420 to 1465

Marinid Sultan
- Reign: October 1420 – 14 August 1465
- Predecessor: Abu Said Uthman III
- Successor: Muhammad ibn Ali Amrani-Joutey
- Born: 1419
- Died: 14 August 1465 (aged 45–46); Fez
Names
- Abd al-Haqq ibn Uthman Abu Muhammad
- Dynasty: Marinid
- Father: Abu Said Uthman III
- Religion: Islam

Abd al-Haqq II (Arabic: عبد الحق الثاني) (Abd al-Haqq ibn Uthman Abu Muhammad; 1419 – 14 August 1465) was Marinid Sultan from 1420 to 1465.

== Life ==
Abd al-Haqq II was made sultan in 1420 under the regency of a Wattasid vizier, and later was nominal sultan under Wattasid control until 1465.

Abd al-Haqq was the son of Sultan Abu Said Uthman III, who made an unsuccessful attempt to recover Ceuta from the Portuguese in 1419. This led to instability in the Marinid state culminating in a coup in Fez in 1420, in which Abu Said Uthman III was assassinated. At that time, his son and heir Abd al-Haqq was just one year old. A succession struggle broke out immediately as other pretenders quickly emerged.

Abu Zakariya Yahya al-Wattasi was governor of Salé. Hearing the news of the sultan's assassination, Abu Zakariya hurried to seize control of the royal palace of Fez, proclaiming the orphan child Abd al-Haqq as the new Marinid sultan and appointing himself his regent and chief minister (vizier). Morocco quickly descended into disorder and strife. By 1423 the regent Abu Zakariya al-Wattasi had emerged the effective ruler of the state.

When Abd al-Haqq came of age in 1437, Abu Zakariya refused to give up the regency. In 1437 a Portuguese attempt to take advantage of the dispute and take Tangier by siege proved unsuccessful, raising the morale of the Moroccans and increasing the prestige of the sharifs who had led the defense. Abu Zakariya took full advantage of the victory to consolidate his power. Any thought of the regency being surrendered was forgotten. In January 1438, under his administration, the tomb of Idris II, founder of Fez and of the Idrisid dynasty, was rediscovered, becoming an important destination for pilgrims.

Abu Zakariya was succeeded by his nephew, Ali ibn Yusuf, in 1448. Ali ibn Yusuf was in turn succeeded by Abu Zakariya's son, Yahya ibn Abi Zakariya, in 1458. Although Abd al-Haqq was nominally sultan, he held no power. He was murdered in 1465 during the 1465 Moroccan revolt.
