= Siege of Ceuta (1419) =

Siege in Portugal

- Part of Reconquista
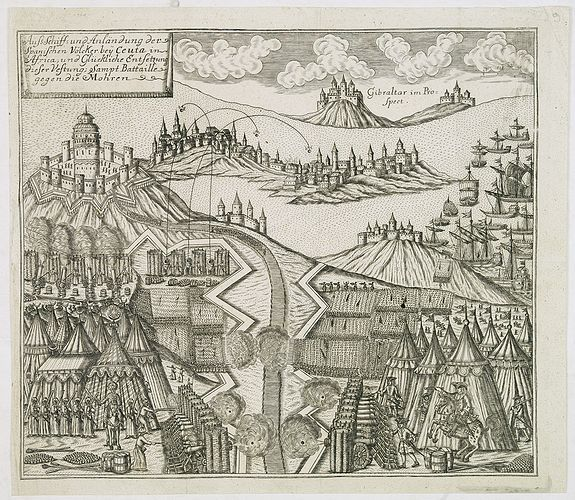
| Date | 13–17 August, 1419 |
| Location | Ceuta |
| Result | Portuguese victory |

Belligerents
| Kingdom of Portugal | Marinid Sultanate; Emirate of Granada |

Commanders and leaders
| Pedro de Menezes; Henry the Navigator; John of Reguengos | Abu Said Uthman III; Muhammad VIII |

Strength
| Unknown | 120,000 |

Casualties and losses
| | 3,000 dead |

The siege of Ceuta of 1419 (sometimes reported as 1418) was fought between the besieging forces of the Marinid sultanate, led by Sultan Abu Said Uthman III, including allied forces from the Emirate of Granada, and the Portuguese garrison of Ceuta, led by Pedro de Menezes, 1st Count of Vila Real. After the loss of the city in a surprise attack in 1415 known as the Conquest of Ceuta, the Sultan gathered an army four years later and besieged the city. The Portuguese gathered a fleet under the command of Princes Henry the Navigator and John of Reguengos to relieve Ceuta. According to the chroniclers, the relief fleet turned out to be quite unnecessary. In a bold gambit, Pedro de Menezes led the Portuguese garrison in a sally against the Marinid siege camp and forced the lifting of the siege before the relief fleet even arrived.

Blamed for losing Ceuta, the Marinid sultan was assassinated in a coup in Fez in 1420, leaving only a child as his heir. the sultanate descended into anarchic chaos, as rival pretenders vied for the throne and local governors carved out regional fiefs for themselves, selling their support to the highest bidder. The political crisis released the pressure on Ceuta for the next few years.
