= List of captains of Asilah =

The Conquest of Asilah took place on 24 August 1471.

This is a list of captains of Asilah under Portuguese rule.

== List of Captains ==
| # | Name (birth–death) | Portrait | Start of Term | End of Term | Notes | ??? |
|---|---|---|---|---|---|---|
| 1 | D. Henrique de Meneses, 4th Count of Viana | | 27 August 1471 | 1480, before 17 February | Died in office | |
| 2 | Lopo Dias de Azevedo | | 1480 | 1482 | - | |
| 3 | D. João de Meneses, 1st Count of Tarouca | | 1482 | 1486 | - | |
| 4 | Álvaro de Faria | | 28 August 1486 | 1488 | - | |
| 5 | D. Vasco Coutinho, 1st Count of Borba, 1st Count of Redondo | | c. 1488 | 1495 | 1st Term, Interim until 9 June 1490 | |
| 6 | D. Rodrigo Coutinho | | 1495 | 1495 | Died in office | |
| 7 | D. João de Meneses | | 1495 | 1495 | 1st Term, Interim | |
| 8 | D. Vasco Coutinho, 1st Count of Borba, 1st Count of Redondo | | 1495 | 1501 | 2nd Term | |
| 9 | D. João Coutinho, 2nd Count of Redondo | | 1501 | 1502 | 1st Term, Interim | |
| 10 | D. João de Meneses | | 9 January 1502 | 1505 | 2nd Term, Interim | |
| 11 | D. Vasco Coutinho, 1st Count of Borba, 1st Count of Redondo | | 1505 | 1508 | 3rd Term | |
| 12 | Jorge Barreto | | 1508 | 1508 | - | |
| 13 | D. Vasco Coutinho, 1st Count of Borba, 1st Count of Redondo | | 1508 | 1513 | 4th Term | |
| 14 | D. João Coutinho, 2nd Count of Redondo | | 1513 | 1513 | 2nd Term, Interim | |
| 15 | D. Vasco Coutinho, 1st Count of Borba, 1st Count of Redondo | | 1513 | 1513 | 5th Term | |
| 16 | D. João Coutinho, 2nd Count of Redondo | | January 1514 | April 1523 | 3rd Term, in Portugal from February 1522 to September 1522 | |
| 17 | D. Manuel de Meneses | | April 1523 | June 1523 | Interim, died in office | |
| 18 | Garcia de Melo | | 1523 | 1523 | In office | |
| 19 | Fernão Caldeira | | 1523 | September 1523 | Interim | |
| 20 | D. João Coutinho, 2nd Count of Redondo | | September 1523 | 1 May 1525 | 4th Term, Interim | |
| 21 | António da Silveira | | 1 May 1525 | 10 October 1529 | Substitute | |
| 22 | D. João Coutinho, 2nd Count of Redondo | | 10 October 1529 | 7 October 1538 | 5th Term, Interim | |
| 23 | D. Manuel Mascarenhas | | 1538 | c. 1544 | - | |
| 24 | Sebastião de Vargas | | 1544 | 1546 | - | |
| 25 | D. Francisco Coutinho, 3rd Count of Redondo | | 1546 | 1549 | - | |
| 26 | Luís de Loureiro | | 1549 | 24 August 1550 | - | |
| 27 | Saadi Sultanate | | 24 August 1550 | 1577 | - | |
| 28 | D. Duarte de Menezes | | 1577 | 1578 | - | |
| 29 | Pedro de Mesquita | | 1578 | 1578 | - | |
| 30 | Pedro da Silva | | 1578 | c. 1580 | - | |
| 31 | Vasco Fernandes Homem | | 1580 | c. 1589 | - | |
| 32 | Saadi Sultanate | | 1589 | c. 1604 | - | |

From c. 1604 until 1691 it had Spanish governors, after which it was abandoned, without Portugal attempting to recover it.
