= Count of Viana (da Foz do Lima) =

Coat of Arms of Álvaro Pires de Castro, 1st Count of Viana (da Foz do Lima).

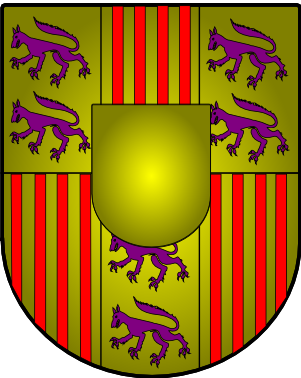
Coat of Arms of the 2nd and 3rd Counts of Viana (da Foz do Lima).

Count of Viana (da Foz do Lima) (in Portuguese Conde de Viana (da Foz do Lima)) was a Portuguese title of nobility granted to Álvaro Pires de Castro, brother of Inês de Castro, granted by King Ferdinand I of Portugal on June 1, 1371. D. Álvaro was already 1st. Count of Arraiolos and 1st. Constable of Portugal.

This county returned to the Crown when the 1st. Count died and it was granted again to Duarte de Menezes on July 6, 1446, by King Edward of Portugal, exchanging it by the county of Viana (do Alentejo), which returned to the Crown. Meanwhile, the county of Viana (da Foz do Lima) was later inherited by his son, Henrique de Menezes.

This title concerned to the city known today as Viana do Castelo, located in the Lima's mouth (in Portuguese Foz do Lima).

== List of counts of Viana (da Foz do Lima) ==
1. Álvaro Pires de Castro (c.1310-1384), also 1st. Count of Arraiolos and Constable of Portugal;
2. Duarte de Menezes (1414–1464), also 3rd Count of Viana (do Alentejo);
3. Henrique de Menezes (c.1450-1480), also 4th Count of Viana (do Alentejo) and 1st Count of Loulé.

== See also ==
- Count of Viana (do Alentejo)
- Count of Loulé
- List of countships in Portugal

== Bibliography ==
"Nobreza de Portugal e Brasil" Vol III, pages 478/480. Published by Zairol, Lda., Lisbon, 1989.
