= Battle of Tangier =

Battle of Tangier or Siege of Tangier may refer to:

- Battle of Tangier (1437)
- Siege of Tangier (1463–1464)
- Battle of Tangier (1502)
- Battle of Tangier (1664)
- Great Siege of Tangier (1680)
- Siege of Tangier (1684)
