= Portuguese conquest of Ksar es-Seghir =

1458 conquest in Morocco

Conquest of Alcácer-Ceguer
- Part of Moroccan–Portuguese conflicts
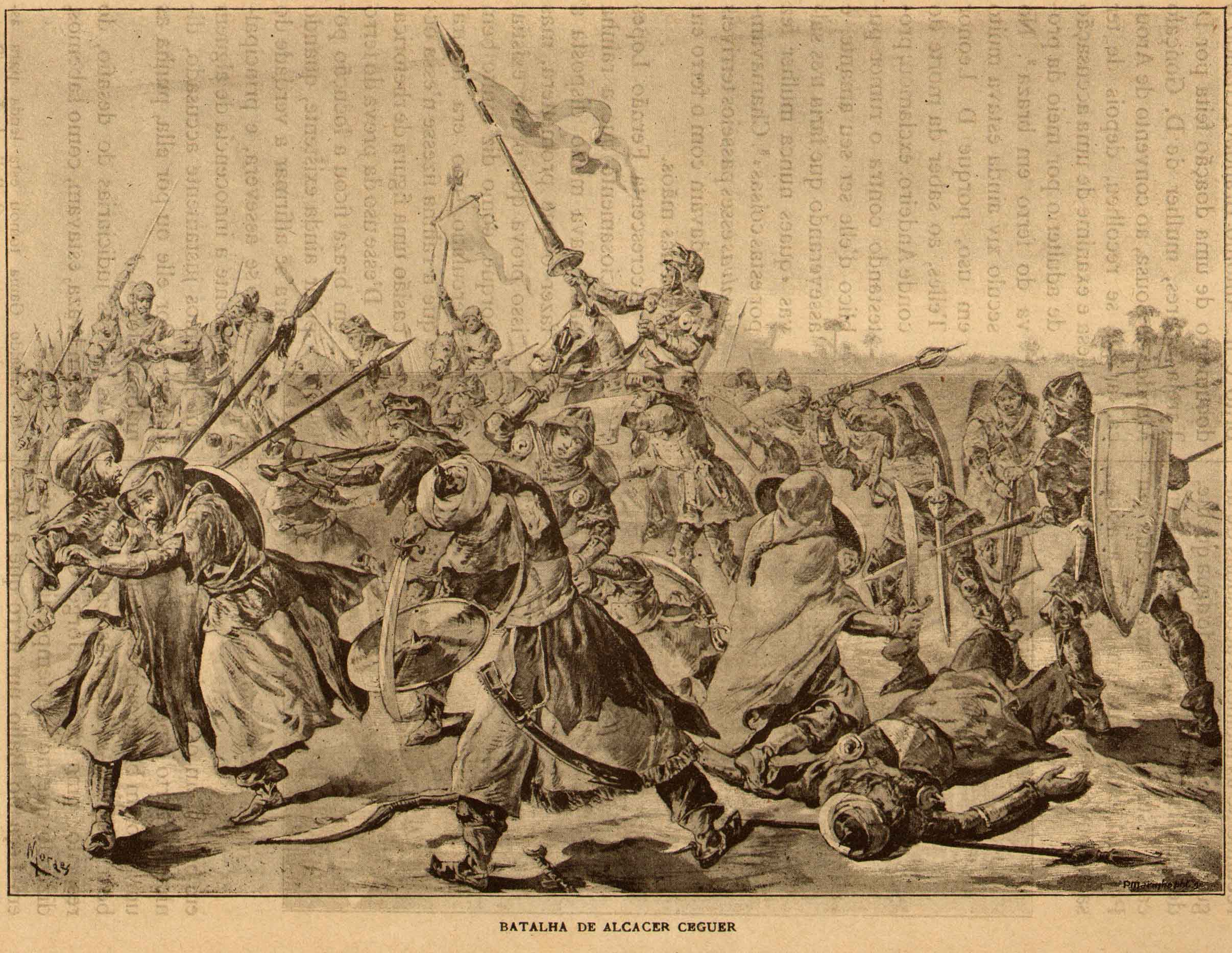
- Battle of Alcacer (illustration by Alfredo Roque Gameiro, c. 1899)
Date	16–18 October 1458.
Location	Ksar es-Seghir, (modern-day Morocco)
Result	Portuguese victory

Belligerents
Kingdom of Portugal	Marinid Sultanate

Commanders and leaders
Afonso V of Portugal; Prince John; Henry the Navigator; Afonso of Braganza; Ferdinand, Duke of Viseu; Master of Aviz and Constable of Portugal Peter	Unknown

Strength
25,000 men 220 or 289 ships.	500 horse Unrecorded number of infantry.

Casualties and losses
Unknown	Unknown

The Portuguese conquest of Ksar es-Seghir (Portuguese: Alcácer-Ceguer) in modern Morocco from the Marinid dynasty took place between 23 and 24 October 1458 by Portuguese forces under the command of King Afonso V, surnamed the African.

== Background ==
Portugal captured the north African city of Ceuta from the Marinid dynasty in 1415.

When the Ottomans had captured Constantinople in 1453, Pope Calixtus III issued a call to a Crusade, which was delivered to Afonso V of Portugal via the Bishop of Silves, and the king pledged to assemble an army to use against the Muslims. Upon sending envoys to Naples and other European Courts however, Afonso found that only he had heeded the call among all European monarchs. After Calixtus had died in 6 August 1458, Afonso decided to attack Tangier in Morocco instead, but was persuaded by the governor of Ceuta Count Sancho de Noronha to divert his forces to capture of Ksar es-Seghir instead, which the king accepted. Ksar es-Seguir at the time served as a Muslim pirate haven for the Marinid Sultan, with whom Portugal was at war.

Marinid rulers after 1420 came under the control of the Wattasids, who exercised a regency as Abd al-Haqq II became Sultan one year after his birth. The Wattasids however refused to give up the Regency after Abd al-Haqq came to age.

The final gathering of men and ships took place in Lagos, in Algarve. The Portuguese fleet numbered 200 or 220 ships and 25,000 or 26,000 warriors, not counting sailors and supporting personnel. Prince Ferdinand, Duke of Viseu, Prince Henry 'the Navigator' in command of the armada of Algarve, the Marquis of Valença Afonso of Braganza in command of the armada of Porto and the Marquis of Vila Viçosa also participated in the expedition. They set sail to Alcácer-Ceguer in 12 October 1458.

Contrary winds forced the royal flagship along with part of the armadad to the waters around Tangier, the conquest of which was pondered by the sovereign at that moment, but he was dissuaded from doing so and the objective to attack Alcácer-Ceguer was maintained, thanks to the influence of Prince Henry the Navigator, who had participated in the failed attack on the city in 1437.

== The battle ==
The Portuguese met some resistance on the beaches of Alcácer-Ceguer, where the garrison had erected barricades manned by crossbowmen and 500 horsemen, in order to prevent the Portuguese from landing. They were however vigorously assaulted by a squadron commanded by Prince Henry the Navigator, and the Muslims forced back to the city. The Portuguese were unable to breach through its gates, but later that night, the Portuguese used a bombard to demolish part of the city walls.

On the morning of October 18, the towns inhabitants surrendered, and were allowed by Afonso V to leave the city with their families and belongings. A number of Christian prisoners were released on the occasion.

== Aftermath ==
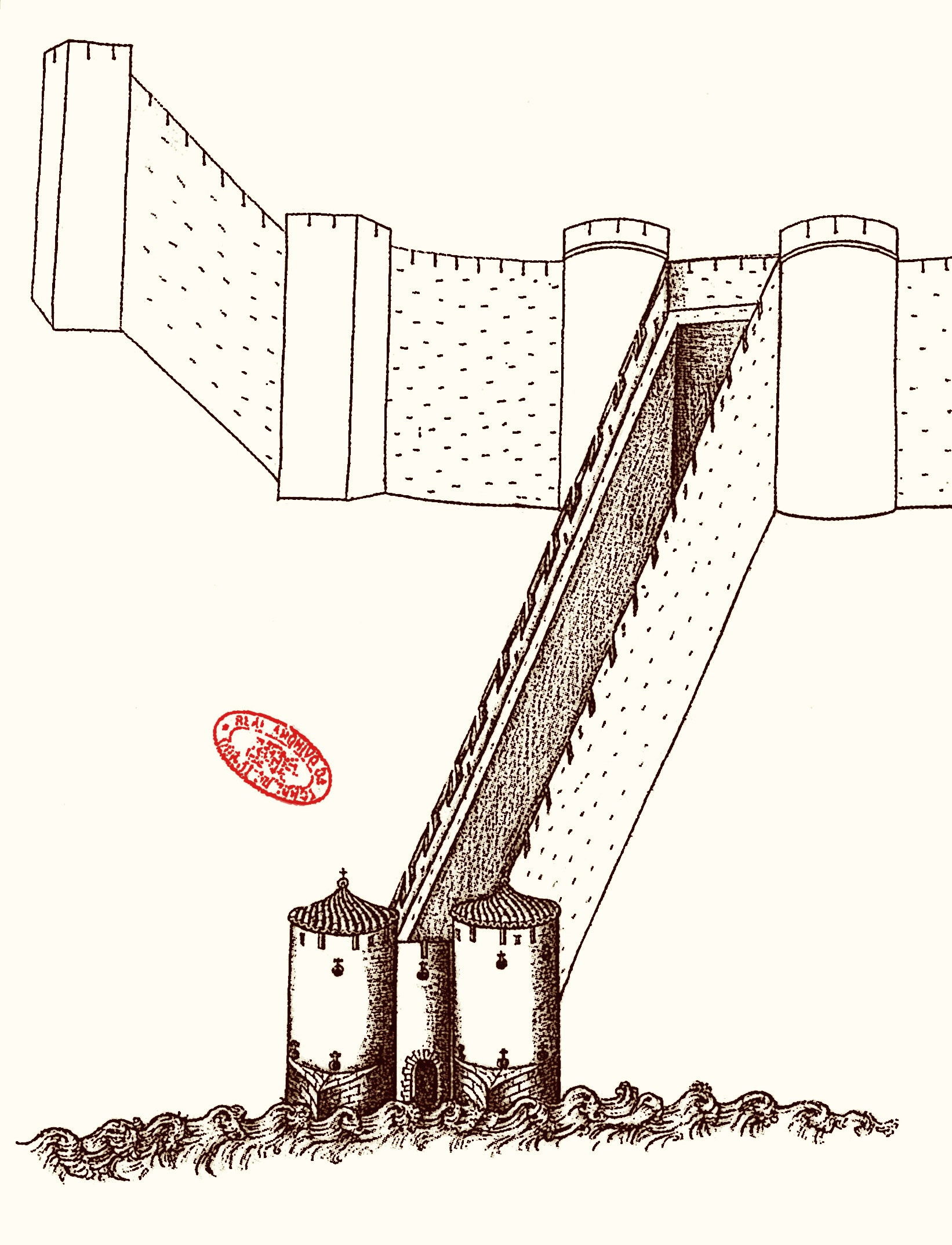
Sketch of the couraça wall designed by Diogo Boitaca in 1502.

The conquest was successful due to the superiority of the Portuguese artillery, and to the decision of the king of Fez, Abd al-Haqq II (Abdalaque in Portuguese) to keep his army in Tangier upon being informed of the presence of the Portuguese fleet, while he was preparing an attack on Tlemcen. Upon hearing that the Portuguese were sieging Ksar es-Seghir he marched out to relieve it, however he did not reach the city in time to prevent its fall, and turned back to organize a siege later.

Afonso V moved to Ceuta, and organized an embassy to deliver to the Sultan of Fez a "polite letter" challenging him to a pitched battle, however his ships were shot at upon sailing into the harbour of Tangier.

The Sultan sieged Alcácer-Ceguer from 13 November 1458 to 2 January 1459 and was unsuccessful in recovering the city from the Portuguese.

The Portuguese immediately began works to restore and reinforce the defenses of the city. The mosque was transformed into a church under the invocation of Santa Maria da Misericórdia, granted to the Order of Christ on the initiative of Prince Henry.

In 1459, Abd al-Haqq II enacted a massacre of the Wattasid family, breaking their power. His reign, however, brutally ended as he was murdered during the 1465 revolt. This event saw the end of the Marinid dynasty as Muhammad ibn Ali Amrani-Joutey, leader of the Sharifs, was proclaimed Sultan in Fes. He was in turn overthrown in 1471 by Abu Abd Allah al-Sheikh Muhammad ibn Yahya, one of the two the surviving Wattasids from the 1459 massacre, who instigated the Wattasid dynasty.

It would remain in Portuguese hands for much of the next century, known by the name of 'Alcácer-Ceguer'. In 1502, the Portuguese began constructing a new set of fortifications that extended the town's walls well into the sea, thereby ensuring a secure landing ground for Portuguese reinforcements and expeditionary forces. The resident population of the town under the Portuguese reached around 800 persons.

== See also ==
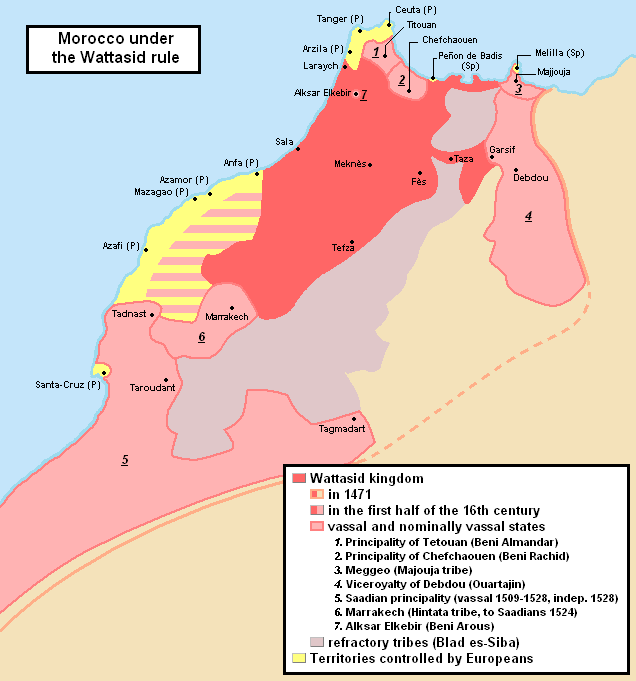
Morocco in the late 15th and 16th centuries.

- Portuguese Empire
- Wattasid dynasty
- House of Avis
- Conquest of Ceuta
- Battle of Tangier (1437)
- Conquest of Asilah
- Henry the Navigator
- Portuguese Asilah
- Portuguese Tangier
