= Portuguese conquest of Tangier =

Portuguese Military Campaign On Tangier

Conquest of Tangier
- Part of Moroccan–Portuguese conflicts
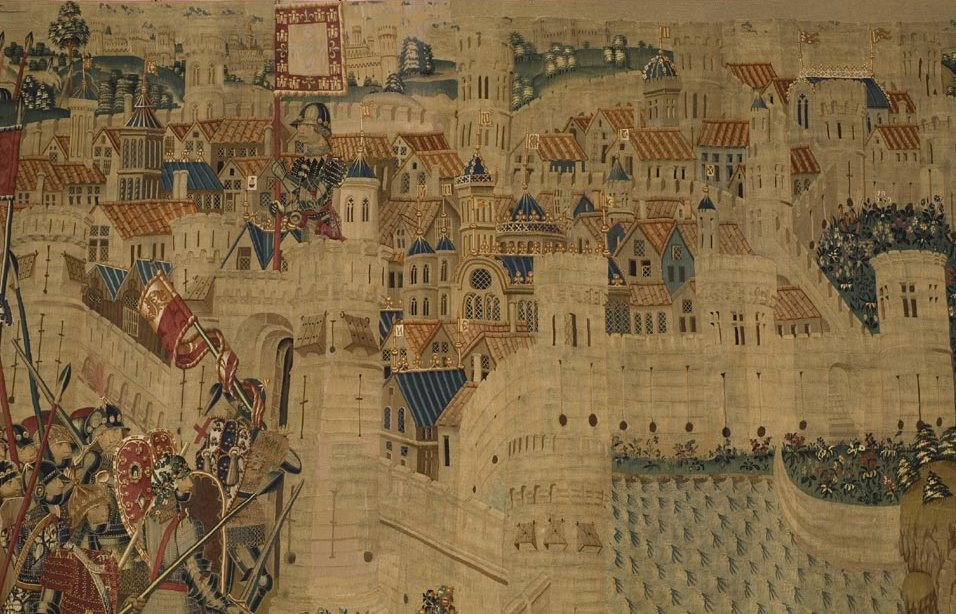
- Gothic tapestry depicting the conquest
Date	28 August 1471
Location	Tangier, Morocco
Result	Portuguese victory
Territorial changes	Establishment of Portuguese Tangier

Belligerents
Kingdom of Portugal	Wattasid dynasty

Commanders and leaders
João of Braganza	Unknown

Strength
Unknown	Unknown

Casualties and losses
Unknown	Unknown

The Portuguese conquest of Tangier (Portuguese: Conquista de Tânger) from the Wattasid dynasty, was a campaign that took place on 28 August 1471 by Portuguese forces under the order of King Afonso V, surnamed the African.

== Background ==
The Portuguese began their overseas expansion with the conquest of Ceuta in 1415. Since then, they had conquered more cities in North Africa, such as, Ksar es-Seghir (1458), Anfa (1471) and Asilah (1471). These conquests, allowed Portugal to go further into Muslim territory, sacking and raiding villages, which brought much profit.

Long before 1471, the Portuguese already intended to take Tangier, having previously launched some attacks in an attempt to conquer the city. The famous disaster of Tangier, in 1437, was one of these attempts led by Prince Henry, the same man who began the Age of Discovery.

On the other hand, Morocco was under serious political and internal conflicts, which made it harder to fight the Portuguese threat.

== The Conquest ==
Shortly after the conquest of Asilah by the Portuguese, Afonso V ordered Dom João, who was probably the son of the Duke of Bragança, to take Tangier.

The citizens of Tangier believed support from Muhammad al-Shaikh, the governor of Asilah, would come to assist in repelling the invading Portuguese army. However, involved in his ongoing conflict with the governor of Fez, al-Shaikh opted to sign a treaty with the Portuguese, allowing them to enter Tangier unopposed.

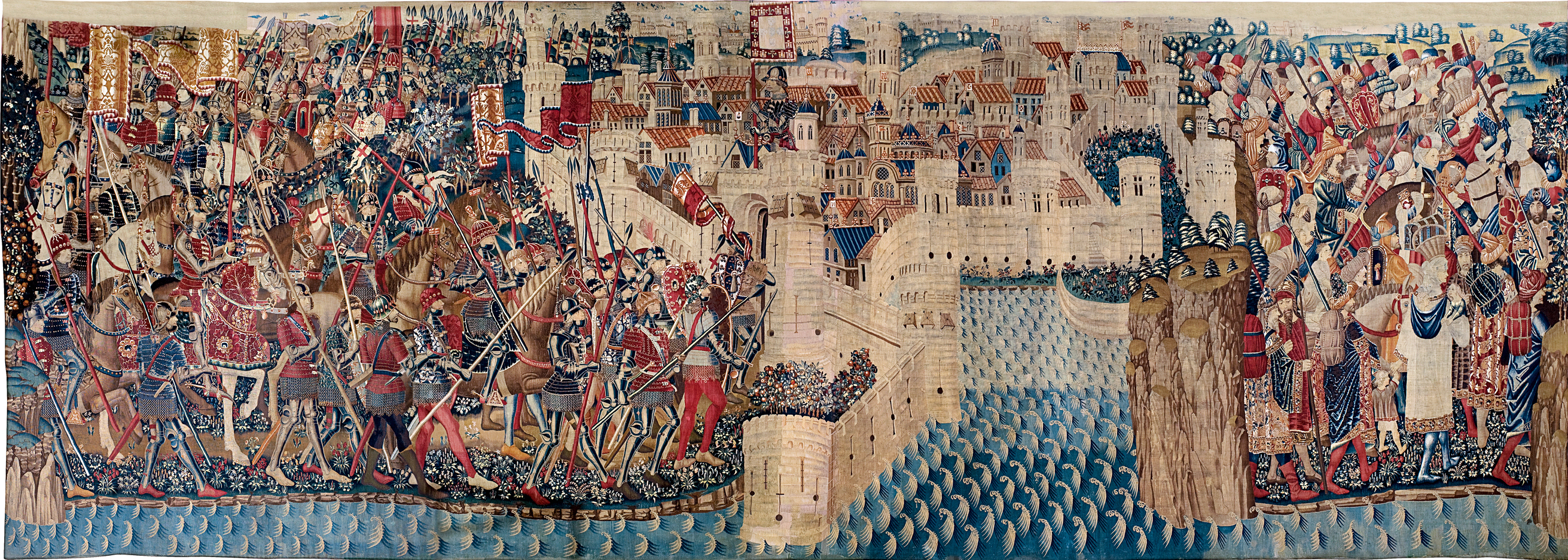
Takeover of Tangier, depicted by the Pastrana Tapestries.

Fearing the same fate as Asilah, where 2,000 residents were killed and more 5,000 sold into captivity, the civilians of Tangier fled the city.

== Aftermath ==
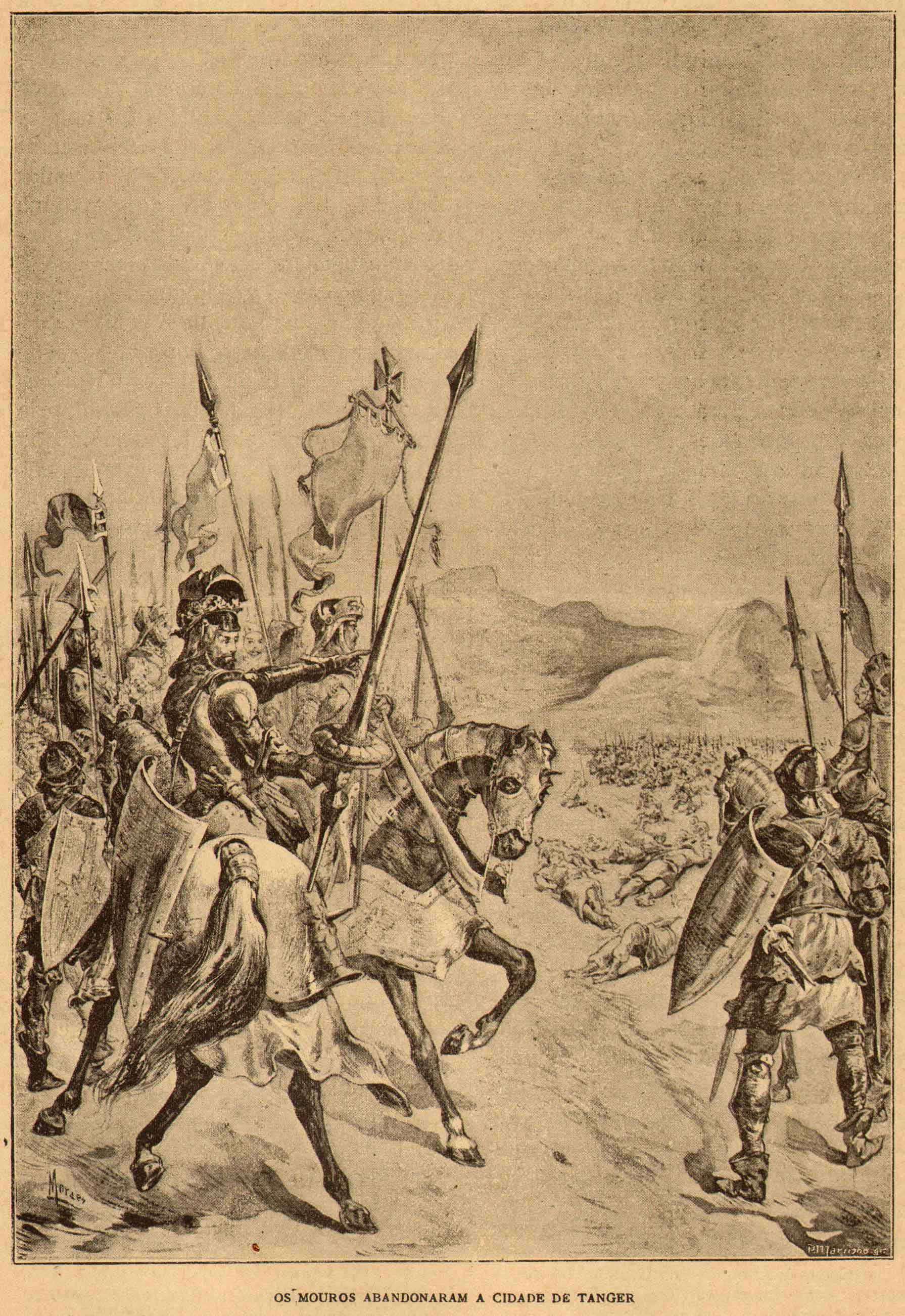
The Moors leaving the city of Tangier (illustration by Alfredo Roque Gameiro, c. 1899)

Dom João nominated the first captain of Tangier to be Rodrigo Afonso de Melo, who took office with a garrison after the Marquis had left with the remainder of his troops. The number of Portuguese soldiers in Tangier in 1471 numbered 40 horsemen; 470 infantry, of which 130 were crossbowmen; 10 gunners, 6 scouts.

Over the next decades, the Portuguese would continue to attack other strategic cities, conquering many. The next generations of Muslim leaders would unsuccessfully assault Portuguese Tangier multiple times. Portuguese rule over Tangier would last until 1661, when they transferred it to England.

== See also ==
- Portuguese Tangier
- Battle of Azemmour
- Battle of Alcácer Quibir
- Moroccan-Portuguese conflicts
- Conquest of Asilah
