= Portuguese Tangier =

Former territory of the Kingdom of Portugal

Portuguese Tangier Tânger Portuguesa (Portuguese) طنجة البرتغالية (Arabic)
- 1471–1661
- Flag

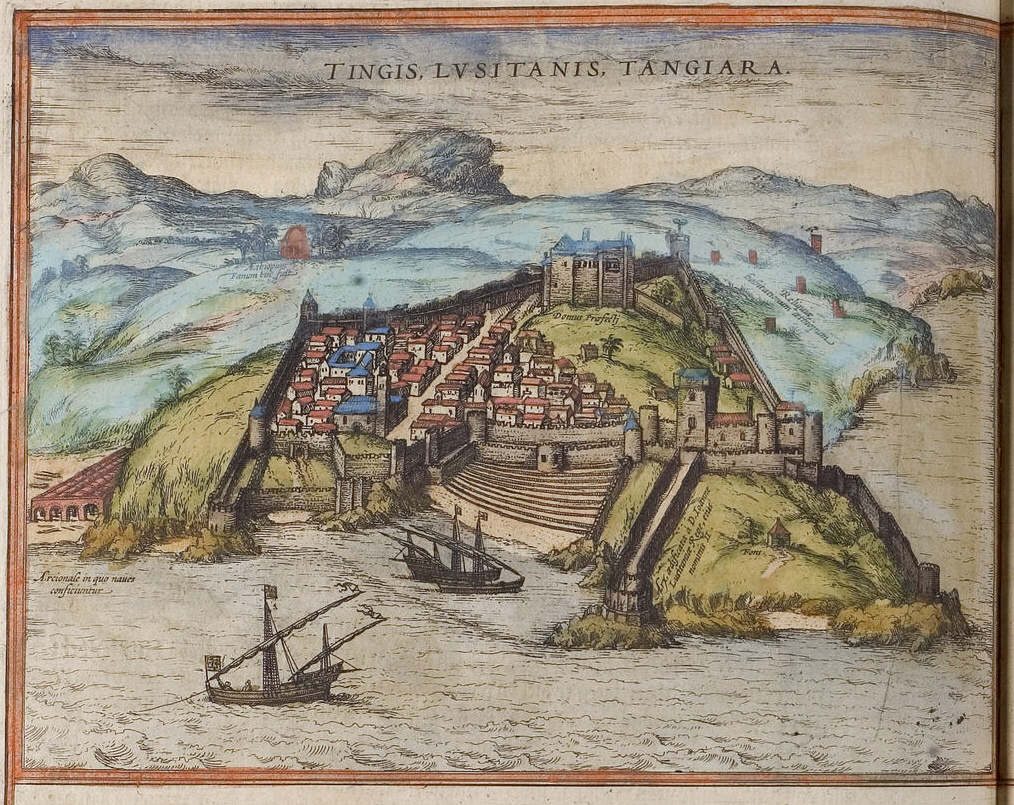
- Portuguese Tangier depicted in Civitates Orbis Terrarum, 1572.
- Status: Territory of the African Algarve, within the Portuguese Empire
- Capital: Tânger
- Religion: Roman Catholicism; Sunni Islam (Majority)
- Government: African Algarve
- King
  - 1471–1477 (first): Afonso V
  - 1656–1661 (last): Afonso VI
- Captain
  - 1471–1484 (first): Rodrigo Afonso de Melo
  - 1661–1662 (last): Luis de Almeida
- Historical era: Early modern period
  - Conquest of Tangier: 1471
  - First siege of Tangier: 1501
  - Anglo-Portuguese Treaty: 23 June 1661
Preceded by	Succeeded by
Wattasid Sultanate	English Tangier
- Today part of: Morocco

Portuguese Tangier (Arabic: طنجة البرتغالية; Portuguese: Tânger Portuguesa) covers the period of Portuguese rule over Tangier, today a city in Morocco. The territory was ruled by the Kingdom of Portugal from 1471 to 1580, 1641 to 1661.

== History ==
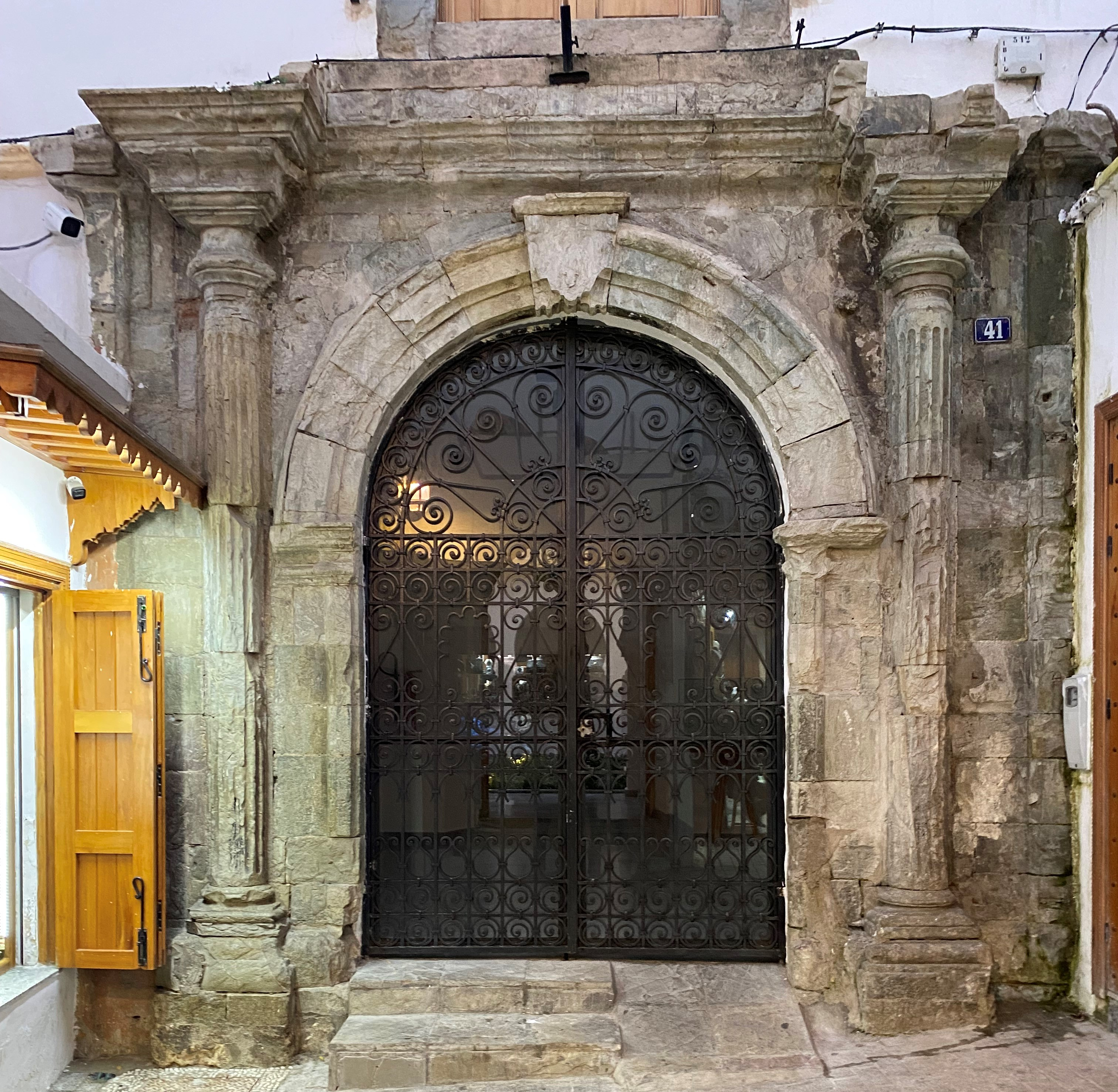
Portuguese-era portal of Dar Niaba in the medina of Tangier (16th or 17th century)

After the Portuguese started their expansion by taking Ceuta in retribution for its piracy in 1415, Tangier became a major goal. Portugal attempted to capture Tangier in 1437, 1458, and 1464 but only succeeded in 28 August 1471 after its population abandoned the city following the Portuguese conquest of Asilah.

From Asilah King Afonso V dispatched the Marquis of Montemor Dom João ahead of a large detachment of troops to take possession of Tangier, and nominated as its first captain the Rodrigo Afonso de Melo, who took office with a garrison after the Marquis had left with the remainder of his troops. The original garrison of Tangier in 1471 numbered 40 horsemen; 470 infantry, of which 130 were crossbowmen; 10 gunners, 6 scouts.

Tangier was considered too large for the Portuguese to adequately defend, hence King Afonso V ordered that three quarters of the city be demolished and the walls restricted to the remaining part.

As in Ceuta, they converted its main mosque into the town's cathedral; it was further embellished by several restoration works. In addition to the cathedral, the Portuguese raised European-style houses and Franciscan and Dominican chapels and monasteries.

=== Siege of Tangier, 1501 ===
In 1501, the Sultan of Fez assembled an army of 12000 men to attack Tangier. The captain of Tangier Dom Rodrigo de Castro was warned of the impending attack shortly before the army of Fez reached the vicinity by a messenger dog that had arrived from Portuguese Asilah with a message hung around its neck. Dom Rodrigo readied the garrison, made a sally to cover the retreat of the farmers and the cattle still outside the walls, and after being wounded in the face and losing 9 men including his son, he withdrew behind the city walls. After fighting at the gate, the Sultan withdrew with his army four days later to attack Asilah instead.

=== Later history ===
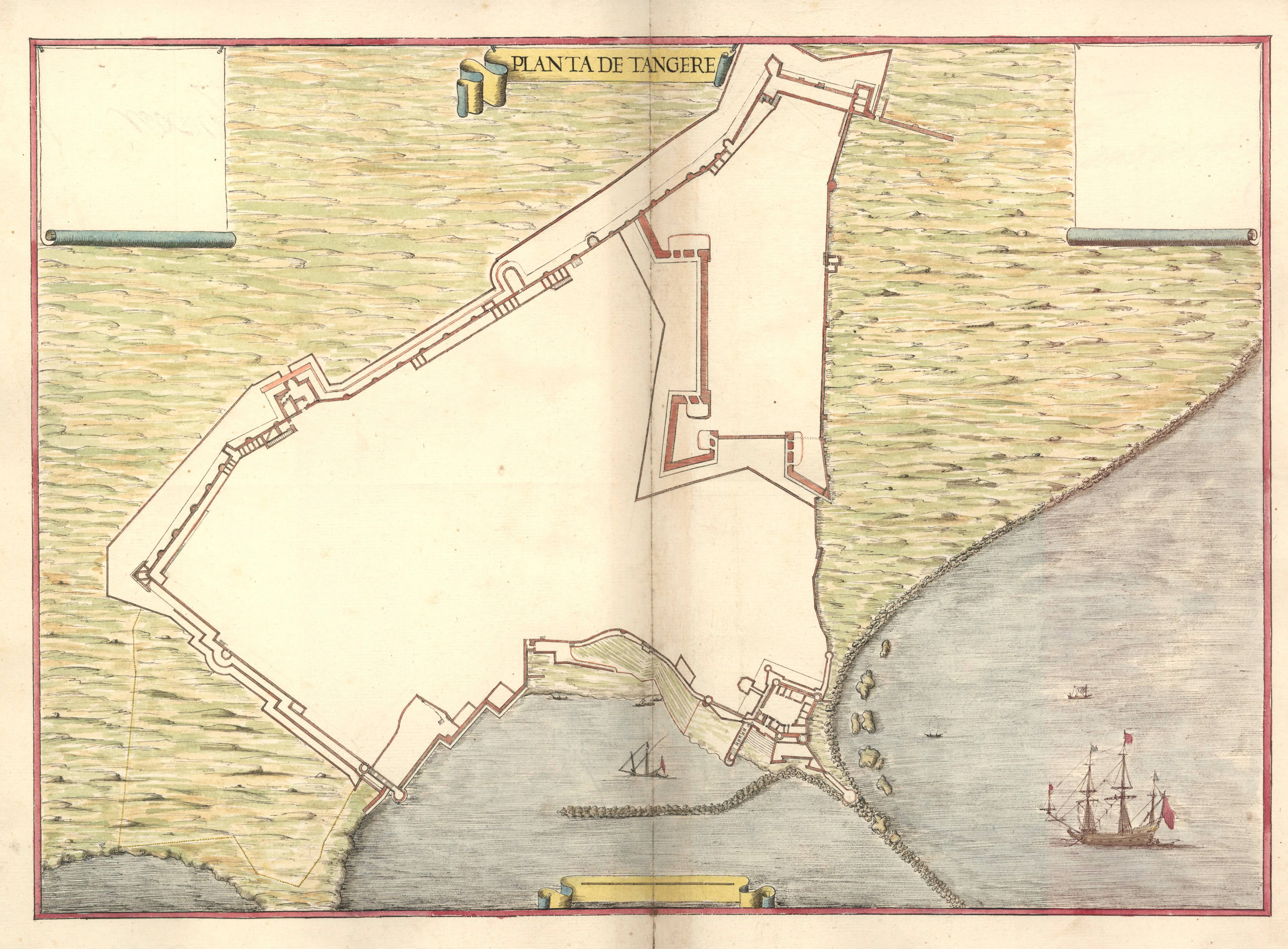
Leonardo de Ferrari's plan of the Portuguese fortifications at Tangier, c. 1655.

The Wattasids assaulted Tangier in 1508, 1511, and 1515 but without success.

In 1508, future Portuguese of India Duarte de Menezes succeeded his father as captain of Tangier, a function he had already been effectively performing in his father's name since 1507. He carved a formidable reputation as a military leader in numerous engagements around Tangier.

The Sultan of Fez Abu Abd Allah al-Burtuqali Muhammad ibn Muhammad laid siege to Tangier in 1511. He succeeded in tearing down part of a bulwark and breach the defensive perimeter, however they were forced back by a force under the command of Dom Duarte de Meneses. Having attempted to storm the city again the following day, the Moroccans were once more prevented from advancing in urban combat, and the Sultan lifted the siege shortly afterwards.

On April 4, 1512, the qaid of Chefchaouen Ali Ibn Rashid al-Alam (Barraxa in Portuguese) and the qaid of Tetouan Cid Almandri II (Almandarim in Portuguese) devastated the region and villages around Tangier with 800 horse, however they were engaged by 200 horse and 200 foot of the garrison of Tangier under the command of Duarte de Meneses and routed, the Portuguese having captured plentiful spoil."

An incident took place in Tangier on the night of September 16, 1533: after Dom Álvaro de Abranches had handed the captaincy to Gonçalo Mendes Sacoto and was preparing to embark back to Portugal, two Moroccans managed to scale the wall with a ladder undetected by the Traição gate, and though an alarm was eventually sounded, they wounded the son of Dom Álvaro Dom Jorge with a spear, Domingues Gonçalves with two stabbings and made off with an African they captured.

In 1532, King John III had already expressed to the Pope his intention of withdrawing from some fortresses in Morocco, however when he requested the opinions of the grandees of Portugal on the matter in 1534, he declared his wish to maintain Tangier. The Portuguese Cortes that held session between 1562 and 1563 after the Great Siege of Mazagan insisted that the king maintain Tangier and strengthen its garrison.

King Sebastian entered Tangier on July 6, 1578, with a fleet of 50 warships and 900 transports bearing an army of over 15000 men, and while there was met by the former Sultan of Morocco Abu Abdallah Mohammed II Saadi, who had appealed to Sebastian for help recovering his throne after having been deposed by his uncle Abu Marwan Abd al-Malik I Saadi. Sebastian then moved his army to Asilah, and from there marched out for the fatal Battle of Alcácer Quibir, where the Portuguese were routed but all three monarchs perished in the action.

The tenure of Jorge de Mendonça, the last captain of Tangier nominated by the Portuguese Crown before the Iberian Union was marked by hardships in the city. The garrison had lost most of its horsemen and veteran soldiers in the Battle of Alcácer-Quibir, and there was a lack of food, which caused many to die of starvation, while poor weather prevented his successor from reaching the city with reinforcements for months.

In 1580, it passed with the rest of Portugal's domains into Habsburg control as part of the Iberian Union but maintained its strictly Portuguese garrison and administration.

In 1661, Tangier was given to England as dowry of Charles II of England when he married Catherine of Braganza, along with the island of Bombay and 800,000 pounds sterling.

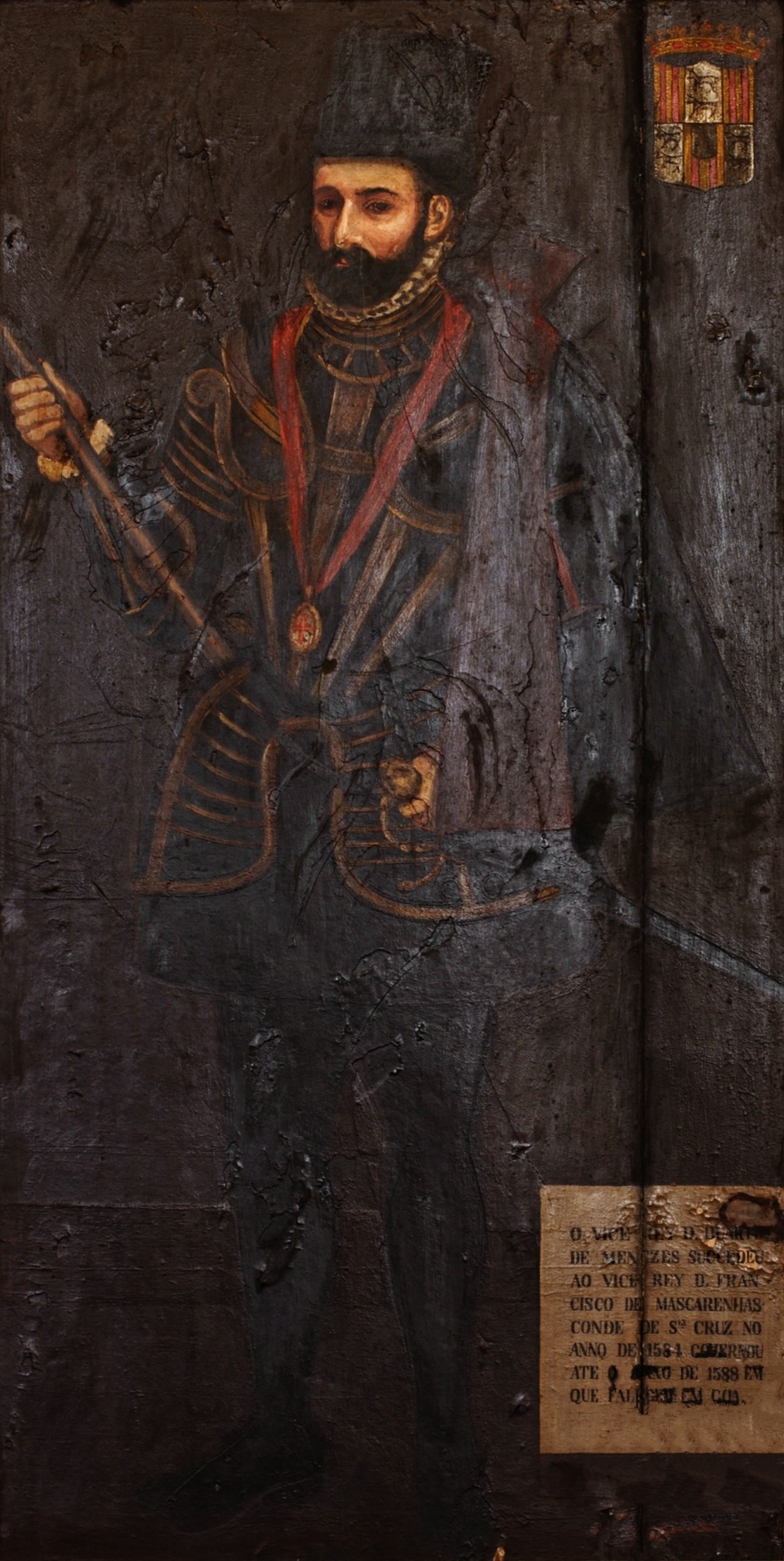
Dom Duarte de Meneses as Viceroy of India.

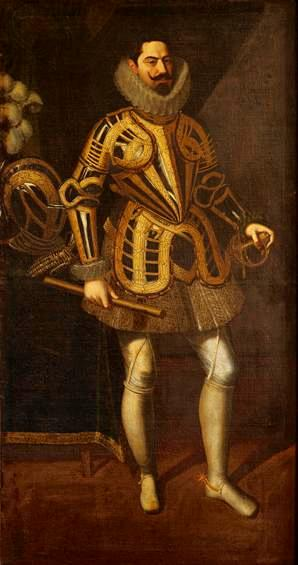
Aires de Saldanha.

== List of governors ==
Tenure	Incumbent	Notes
28 August 1471–1484	Rodrigo Afonso de Melo, 1st Count of Olivença	Took possession following the Conquest of Asilah.
1484–1486	Manuel de Melo, Count of Olivença	
1486–1489	João de Meneses, 1st Count of Tarouca	First term.
1487–1489	Fernão Martins Mascarenhas	Interim.
1489–1490	Manuel Pessanha	Interim.
1490–1501	Lopo Vaz de Azevedo	
1501–1508	João de Meneses, 1st Count of Tarouca	Second term.
1508–1521	Duarte de Menezes	First term.
1521–1522	Henrique de Meneses	
1522–1533	Duarte de Meneses, from Évora	
1533–1536	Gonçalo Mendes Sacoto	
1536–1539	Duarte de Menezes	Second term.
1539–1546	João de Meneses	
1546–1548	Francisco Botelho	
1548–1550	Pedro de Meneses	
1550–1552	João Álvares de Azevedo	
1552–1553	Luís de Loureiro	
1553	Fernando de Menezes	
1553–1554	Luís da Silva de Meneses	
1554–1564	Bernardim de Carvalho	
1564–1566	Lourenço de Távora	
15 July 1566–1 August 1572	João de Meneses	
1572–1573	Rui de Carvalho	
1573–1574	Diogo Lopes da Franca	
1574–15 August 1574	António of Portugal	
1574–1578	Duarte de Meneses, Viceroy of Portuguese India	
1578–September 1578	Pedro da Silva	
7 September 1578–25 July 1581	Jorge de Mendonça	Last captain nominated by the Portuguese Crown before the Iberian Union.

Spanish (1580-1641)

Tenure	Incumbent	Notes
25 July 1581–1590	Francisco de Almeida	
1590–June 1591	Belchior da França and Simão Lopes de Mendonça	
17 June 1591–24 August 1599	Aires de Saldanha	
24 August 1599–22 September 1605	António Pereira Lopes de Berredo	
22 September 1605–March 1610	Nuno de Mendonça	
March 1610–June 1614	Afonso de Noronha	
June 1614–October 1614	Luís de Meneses, 2nd Count of Tarouca	
October 1614– August 1615	Luís de Noronha	
August 1615–22 December 1616	João Coutinho, 5th Count of Redondo	
22 December 1616–1 July 1617	André Dias da França	
1 July 1617–1621	Pedro Manuel	
1621–13 March 1622	André Dias da França	
13 March 1622–July 1624	Jorge de Mascarenhas, Marquis of Montalvão	
July 1624–14 May 1628	Miguel de Noronha, 4th Count of Linhares	
14 May 1628–18 June 1628	Galaaz Fernandes da Silveira	
18 June 1628–1637	Fernando de Mascarenhas, Count of Torre	
15 April 1637–24 August 1643	Rodrigo Lobo da Silveira	

Portuguese (1641-1662)

Tenure	Incumbent	Notes
1643–16 April 1645	André Dias da França	
16 April 1645–20 November 1649	Caetano Coutinho	
20 November 1649–January 1653	Luís Lobo, Baron of Alvito	
January 1653–7 March 1656	Rodrigo de Lencastre. Additional data are available.	
7 March 1656–1661	Fernando de Meneses, 2nd Count of Ericeira. Additional data are available.	
1661–29 January 1662	Luís de Almeida, 1st Count of Avintes	

== See also ==
- Portuguese Asilah

== Sources ==
- Elbl, Martin M. (2013), Portuguese Tangier (1471-1662): Colonial Urban Fabric as Cross-Cultural Skeleton, Peterborough (Canada): Baywolf Press, ISBN 978-0-921437-50-5. URL is only preview.
- Elbl, Martin M (2019), "Tangier’s Domus Praefecti (’s House) and Ceuta’s Paços Reais / Paço Velho (Palacio Viejo): 3D-Modelling Vanished Prestige Dwellings and Cross-Cultural Symbols of Governance," in Encounters in Borderlands: Portugal, Ceuta, and the 'Other Shore' (Toronto & Peterborough), pp. 177–242. URL offers full text (verified 28 May 2023); https://utoronto.academia.edu/MartinMalcolmElbl
- Elbl, Martin M (2021), "A Tale of Two Breakwaters: Modelling Portuguese and English Works in the Port of Tangier Bathymetric Space (1500s - 1683)," Portuguese Studies Review vol. No. 29, issue 2; https://utoronto.academia.edu/MartinMalcolmElbl. URL offers full text (verified 12 May 2023).
- Lévi-Provençal, Évariste (1936), "Tangier", Encyclopaedia of Islam, vol. Vol. IV (1st ed.), Leiden: E.J. Brill, pp. 650–652.
- Finlayson, Iain (1992), Tangier: City of the Dream, London: Tauris Parke, ISBN 9781780769264.
