= Duarte de Meneses, 3rd Count of Viana =

Portuguese nobleman

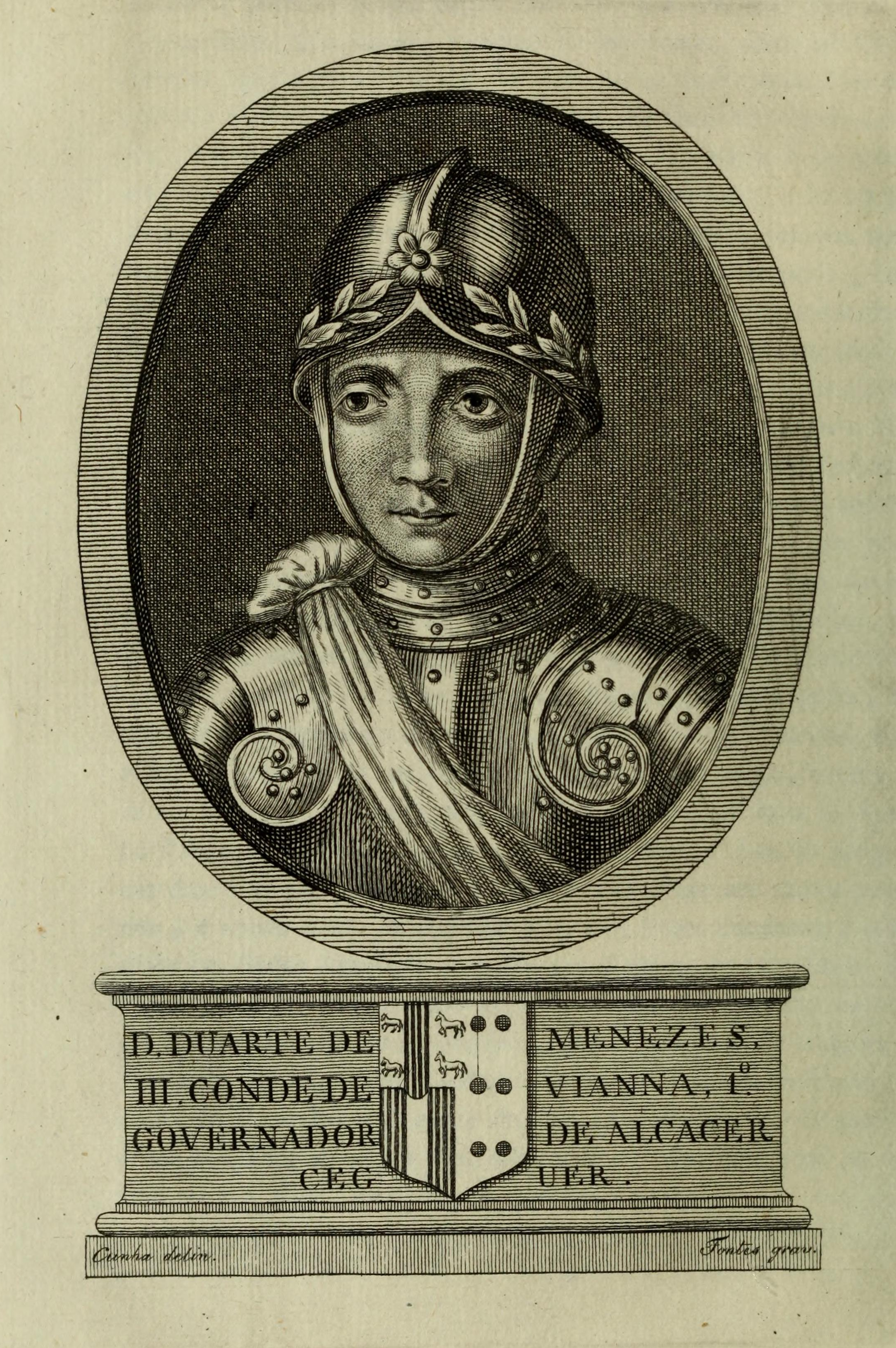
D. Duarte de Menezes

Dom Duarte de Menezes, (Lisbon, 1414 – near Tétouan, Morocco, 20 January 1464) was a 15th-century Portuguese nobleman and military figure. Duarte de Menezes (sometimes modernized as de Meneses) was the 3rd Count of Viana do Alentejo, 2nd Count of Viana (da Foz do Lima), Lord of Caminha and the first Portuguese captain of Alcácer-Ceguer.

== Family ==
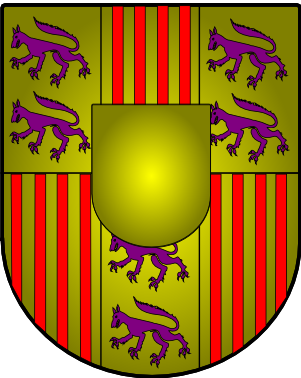
Coat of Arms of Duarte de Menezes, 3rd Count of Viana.

Duarte de Menezes was an illegitimate son of Portuguese nobleman D. Pedro de Menezes, 1st Count of Vila Real and first governor of Ceuta, and Isabel Domingues, an unmarried woman known as a Pixegueira. Although Pedro de Menezes had numerous daughters, legitimate and otherwise, Duarte was his only son. In March 1424, Pedro managed to secure from King John I of Portugal a royal letter legitimizing Duarte to enable him to inherit his titles.

== Ceuta ==
Duarte de Menezes stayed with his father during his tenure as governor in Ceuta, and was given hands-on training in governorship and the military arts. Already at an early age, Duarte distinguished himself in numerous engagements and skirmishes with Moroccan fighters, and was already knighted by 15. In 1430, Pedro de Menezes took an extended leave in Portugal, leaving Duarte, at the age of 16, as captain of the Portuguese garrison in Ceuta, with the guidance of his older brother-in-law, Ruy Gomes da Silva, alcaide of Campo Maior. His father returned in 1434, but continued to rely on Duarte as his lieutenant.

In 1436–37, preparations were underway in Portugal for a resumption of the North African campaign with expedition to seize Tanger. In 1436, Duarte personally led a Portuguese party to attack and raze the Moroccan citadel of Tétouan, to prevent it from becoming a threat to future Portuguese operations.

The Portuguese expeditionary force under Prince Henry the Navigator finally arrived in Ceuta in August 1437. Henry appointed Duarte de Menezes to command the Ceuta troops in the center of the overland march to Tangier. Duarte de Menezes helped lead the way, carrying the royal standard in his father's place (Pedro de Menezes, the alferes-mor (standard-bearer) of the realm, was too ill to accompany the march). The siege of Tangier had only started, when Duarte received the news that his father's illness had taken a turn for the worse. Duarte rushed back to Ceuta, just in time to receive his father's blessing before he expired on September 22. For the next few days, Duarte de Menezes remained in Ceuta organizing his father's affairs and forwarding cannon and supplies to the siege of Tangier. He was already back in Tangier when the full force of the Marinid army fell upon the besieging Portuguese expeditionary force, and turned the tables around. The Marinids starved the Portuguese siege camp at Tangier into submission. To save his army from destruction, Prince Henry the Navigator agreed to a treaty that promised to restore Ceuta to the Marinids. Rather than return to Lisbon, Henry proceeded immediately to Ceuta, ostensibly to instruct Duarte to prepare to evacuate the garrison, but Henry ended up barricading himself in his rooms in a deep depression. In the end, the Portuguese refused to honor the treaty, and decided to hold on to Ceuta, leaving the royal hostage Ferdinand the Saint Prince to die in Moroccan captivity.

== Portugal ==
Back in Portugal, despite his father's efforts and his own illustrious military record, Duarte de Menezes was only able to inherit his family title of Count of Viana do Alentejo. The crown-granted titles of Count of Vila Real, alferes-mor of the kingdom and governor of Ceuta went to Duarte's legitimate sister Brites de Menezes and her consort Fernando de Noronha. Duarte de Menezes left Ceuta shortly after, passing the garrison over to Fernando de Noronha, and returned to Portugal by July 1438. King Edward of Portugal quickly regretted his decision, and personally apologized to Duarte for failing to appoint him to Ceuta and tried to make up for it by appointing him alcaide of Beja and other benefices.

After Edward's death in September 1438, Duarte de Menezes, re-appointed as alferes-mor, personally carried the royal standard during the acclamation of the young King Afonso V of Portugal. In the subsequent regency crisis, Duarte de Menezes, like much of the nobility, sided with the queen-regent Eleanor of Aragon against the king's popular uncle, Peter of Coimbra. But he eventually reconciled with the regent Peter, and was confirmed in his titles. Duarte de Menezes reputation and experience prompted Peter to appoint him to sensitive military posts. Duarte led Portuguese incursions in 1441 and 1444, to assist the Crown of Castile against the rebellious Infantes of Aragon. At the request of John II of Castile, Duarte de Menezes was subsequently posted to serve on the frontier of the Emirate of Granada, but stayed only a few months.

In August 1444, regent Peter of Coimbra appointed Duarte de Menezes to the high office of alferes-mor (standard-bearer) of the realm. Duarte accompanied constable Peter of Portugal (regent Peter's son) in another interventionist incursion into Castile in July 1445.

The relationship between Peter and Duarte de Menezes ended abruptly when King Afonso V of Portugal reached majority in 1448 and dismissed the regent Peter. Afonso V immediately dispatched Duarte de Menezes as military governor of Pombal, a critical fortress on the borderlands of Coimbra, to keep a check on the dismissed regent's movements. Duarte de Menezes fought for the king against Peter at the Battle of Alfarrobeira in May 1449. In reward for his loyalty, Duarte de Menezes' royal pensions were expanded, and his crown-granted titles, including alferes-mor, confirmed inheritable in his family.

== Alcácer-Ceguer ==
In October 1458, King Afonso V of Portugal launched a new operation against Morocco, the first since the disaster at Tangier in 1437. The Marinid sultan Abd al-Haqq II, then laying siege to Tlemcen, heard the news of the massive Portuguese expeditionary force and presuming it was another attempt at Tangier, sent the bulk of his forces to that city. Instead, the Portuguese fleet swooped down on Ksar es-Seghir (Port: Alcácer-Ceguer), seizing the city in a two-day assault on 23–24 October 1458. Afonso V appointed Duarte de Menezes as the first captain and governor of Alcácer-Ceguer.

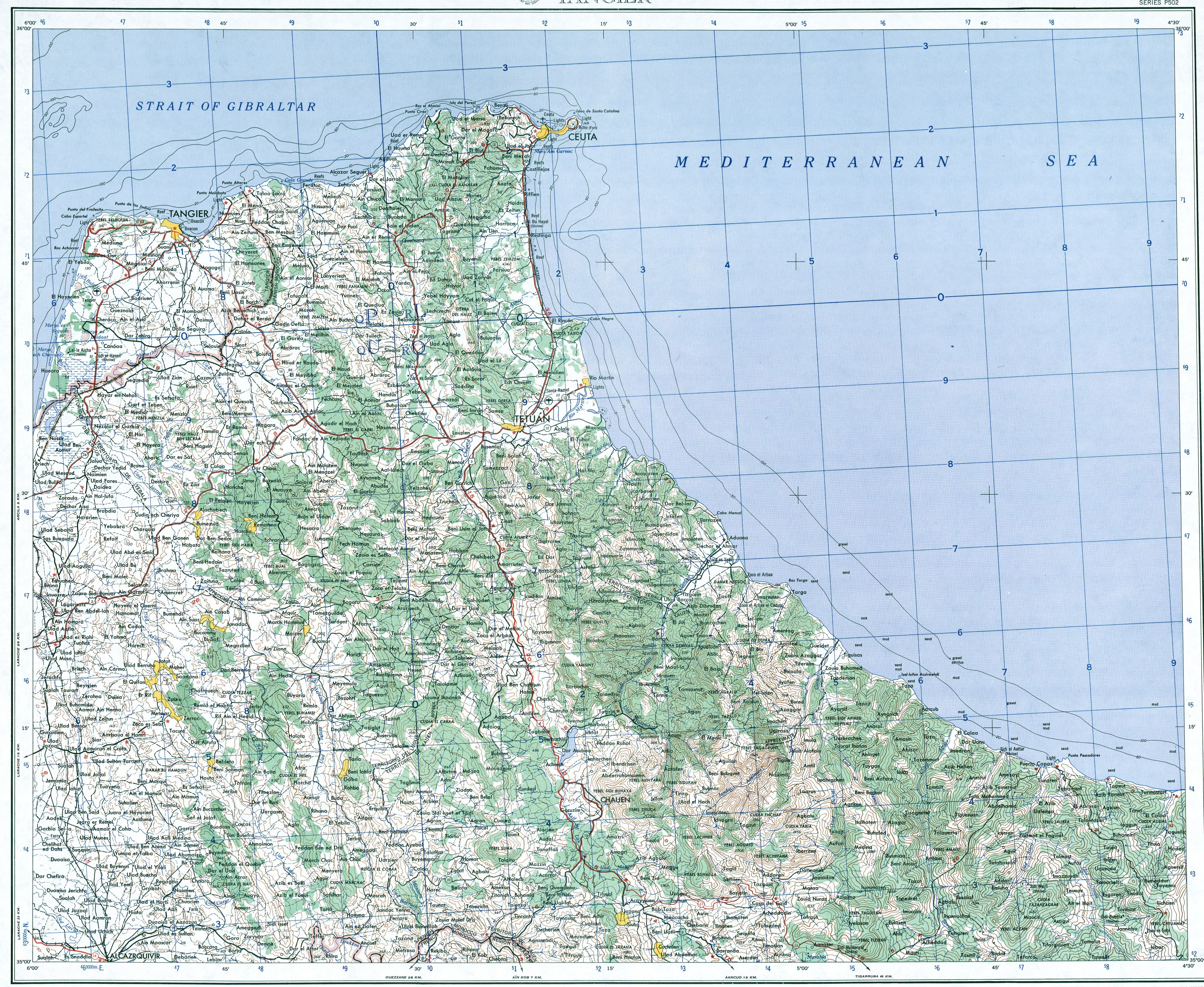
Topographic map of the region around Alcácer-Ceguer (1954 map)

Duarte de Menezes first order of business was to prepare the defenses of the citadel for the inevitable reaction by the Marinids. The Moroccan army, led by Abd al-Haqq II, laid siege to the Alcácer-Ceguer in November 1458. A Portuguese relief fleet was prevented from reaching the city, leaving Duarte de Menezes and the little garrison to hold out on their own against the Marinid siege for nearly two months. Duarte de Menezes is said to have engaged in singular heroics, leading several bold sallies to break up Marinid assaults. After 53 days, having taken enough damage from the sallies and the onset of disease, the Moroccan army lifted the siege on 2 January 1459.

Six months later, the Marinid army returned and resumed the siege on 2 July 1459. Once again, Duarte de Menezes rallied the defenses of Alcácer-Ceguer and held out. Oddly, Duarte sent for his family from Portugal, who somehow managed to penetrate the siege lines and reach the city. The success of this venture helped lift the morale of the garrison. At length, on 24 August 1459, Abd al-Haqq II called off the siege.

In April 1460, having engaged in a few more skirmishes around the area, Duarte de Menezes felt the situation secure enough to return to Lisbon, leaving the garrison in the hands of his nephew, Afonso Teles. He was received with great pomp by Afonso V of Portugal, who promptly granted Duarte de Menezes the title of Count of Viana (da Foz do Lima) (title had been vacant since the death of its first holder back in 1384) and Lord of Caminha. He also swapped the alcaideship of Beja for benefices in Redinha.

Duarte de Menezes returned to Alcácer-Ceguer in 1461. That very year, he is known to have led three raiding sorties to the outskirt of Tangier. In August 1462, Duarte de Menezes crossed the Straits of Gibraltar, to help the Castilians seize Gibraltar from the Emirate of Granada

== Tangier ==
In 1463, Afonso V of Portugal decided to lead another expedition to Africa, this time to seize Tangier. Duarte de Menezes advised against the plan, urging greater reliance on the element of surprise. But the old veteran's advice was set aside, in large part on account of the jealous intrigues of his nephew, Pedro de Menezes, 3rd Count of Vila Real (then governor of Ceuta) who persuaded the king that Duarte merely sought to prevent anyone but himself from achieving glories in Africa. The expedition set out in November 1463, and met a disastrous storm, which sunk several ships and scattered the remainder. Duarte de Menezes, from his perch in Alcácer-Ceguer, caught sight of the king's sail and set out with some vessels to escort the remainder of the fleet safely to Ceuta.

The king's council assembled, Afonso V insisted on the scheme to attack Tangier. He would send the captain of the fleet, Luíz Mendes de Vasconcelos, with a seaborne contingent to scale a relatively low stretch of wall on the seaward side of the citadel of Tangier, while he would himself lead an infantry column overland and blockade the city on the landward wide. Once again, Duarte de Menezes objected to the plan, once again he was overruled. The assault came to naught - bad weather and Tangier artillery kept the naval squad away, and the king, thinking the guns signalled success of the sea landing, attacked impetuously, before realizing his error. The king is said to have chided his companions for persuading him to ignore the counsel of Duarte de Menezes.

King Afonso V returned to Ceuta, dispatching his brother, the Infante Ferdinand, with some troops to Duarte in Alcácer-Ceguer in December, while contemplating his next move. But without awaiting the king's instructions, and against the strenuous objections of Duarte de Menezes, in January 1464, the Infante Ferdinand decided to assault Tangier by himself. It failed. He tried again a week later, and it failed again, with great casualties.

By this time, Afonso V had decided upon abandoning the enterprise, but was determined not to return to Portugal without some glorious feat of arms. In late January 1464, Afonso V decided to personally lead a raid inland. Once again, Duarte de Menezes, who happened to be visiting Ceuta, advised the king against it, but the king insisted and set out on a raid south. Duarte de Menezes, and several other nobles, reluctantly accompanied him. In the Benacofu hills south of Tétouan, King Afonso V's party was lured and ambushed by a Moroccan party. The monarch seemingly doomed, Duarte de Menezes threw himself forward to fight off the attack. Duarte de Menezes held his position long enough to allow the king to slip away, but was himself eventually cut down. The rattled Afonso V scrambled back to Ceuta and thereupon back to Portugal.

The remains of Duarte de Menezes were never recovered from the Benacofu hills. A single finger (or a single tooth), alleged to have belonged to Duarte de Menezes, eventually turned up. Upon that sparse relic, his wife Isabel de Castro commissioned the erection of a magnificently-carved effigy tomb for Duarte de Menezes, embedded in an arcosolium at a Franciscan cloister in Santarém, Portugal. In 1928, the tomb as a whole was moved from the cloister to the nearby museum-church of São João de Alporão in Santarém.

Shortly after his return to Portugal in 1464, King Afonso V instructed the royal chronicler Gomes Eanes de Zurara to drop his other tasks and write down the life and feats of Duarte de Menezes (Zurara had already written a hagiography of his father, Pedro de Menezes). For research, Zurara spent a full year in Alcácer-Ceguer, interviewing his companions and soldiers, visiting the sites of Duarte's battles, and, surprisingly enough for the time, also interviewing his Moroccan enemies. Zurara's Chronica do Conde D. Duarte de Menezes, the longest and best-researched of Zurara's chronicles, was finished around 1468 (although no complete manuscript copy has yet been found - it is estimated around a third of it has been lost; Zurara's chronicle - riddled with gaps - was first published in 1793). In 1627, Agostinho Manuel de Vasconcellos probably drew upon Zurara's account to compose his own Vida de Don Duarte de Meneses.

== Descendants ==
Duarte de Menezes married twice.

- first marriage (May 1439) to Isabel de Melo, the daughter of Martim Afonso de Melo, alcaide-mor of Évora, and widow of João Rodrigues Coutinho, produced one daughter:
1. Maria de Meneses, who married D. João de Castro, 2nd Count of Monsanto.
- second marriage (July 1442) to Isabel de Castro, daughter of D. Fernando de Castro, governor of the household of Prince Henry the Navigator, produced the following issue:
1. Henrique de Meneses, 4th Count of Viana (do Alentejo), 3rd Count of Viana (da Foz do Lima), 1st Count of Loulé and first Portuguese captain of Arzila
2. Garcia de Menezes, Bishop of Évora
3. Fernando de Menezes, 'o Narizes', stem of the Marquises of Valada
4. João de Menezes, 1st Count of Tarouca, mordomo-mor of kings John II and Manuel I and father of India governor Duarte de Menezes.
5. Isabel de Menezes, a nun in Aveiro

While a bachelor, Duarte de Menezes also had an illegitimate son from the unmarried D. Beatriz Dias:

- D. Pedro Galo - legitimized by royal letter, December 1462.

== Sources ==
- "Nobreza de Portugal e Brasil" - Vol. III, pág. 478–480, publicado por Representações Zairol Lda., Lisboa, 1989
- Agostinho Manuel de Vasconcellos,Vida de Don Duarte de Meneses, Tercero Conde de Viana y sucessos notables de Portugal en su tiempo, published 1627, Lisbon: Pedro Craesbeeck. online
- Gomes Eanes de Zurara (c. 1468) "Chronica do Conde D. Duarte de Menezes", first published 1793 in J.F. Correia da Serra, editor, Collecção de livros ineditos de historia portugueza. Lisbon: Academia das Ciências de Lisboa, Vol. 3.
- J.A. Marquez de Prado (1859) Historia de la Plaza de Ceuta, describiendo los sitios que ha sufrido en distintas épocas por las huestes del imperio de Marruecos p.91
- "Duarte de Menezes", in H. Banquero Moreno (1980)A Batalha de Alfarrobeira: antecedentes e significado histórico, Coimbra University, vol.2 p.874
- Ignacio da Costa Quintella (1839) Annaes da Marinha Portugueza, Vol. 1, Lisbon: Academia Real das Sciencias.
- Heinrich Schaefer (1893) Historia de Portugal: desde a fundação da monarchia até a Revolução de 1820. Porto: Escriptorio, vol. 2, p.350ff.
