= Portuguese Asilah =

African polity

Portuguese Arzila Arzila Portuguesa (Portuguese) أصيلة البرتغالية (Arabic)
- 1471–1550; 1577–1589
- Flag

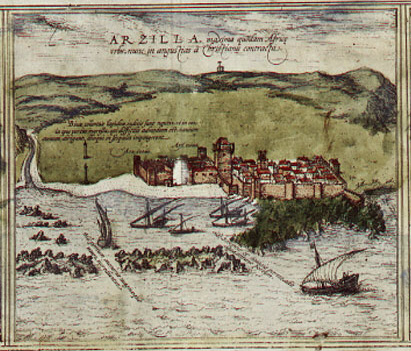
- Portuguese Arzila depicted in Civitates Orbis Terrarum, 1593.
- Status: Territory of the African Algarve within the Portuguese Empire
- Capital: Arzila
- Religion: Roman Catholicism; Sunni Islam (Majority)
- King
  - 1471–1477 (first): Afonso V
  - 1580–1589 (last): Philip I
- Captain
  - 1471–1479 (first): Henrique de Meneses
  - 1580–1589 (last): Vasco Fernandes Homem
- Historical era: Early modern period
  - Conquest of Asilah: 1471
  - First siege of Asilah: 1508
  - Captured by Saadi Sultanate: 1550
  - Restored to Sebastian I: 1577
  - Restored to Saadi Sultanate: 1589
Preceded by	Succeeded by
Wattasid Sultanate	Saadi Sultanate
- Today part of: Morocco

Portuguese Asilah (Portuguese: Arzila Portuguesa) covers the period of Portuguese rule over Asilah, today a city in Morocco. The territory was ruled by the Kingdom of Portugal from 1471 to 1550 and again between 1577 and 1589.

== History ==
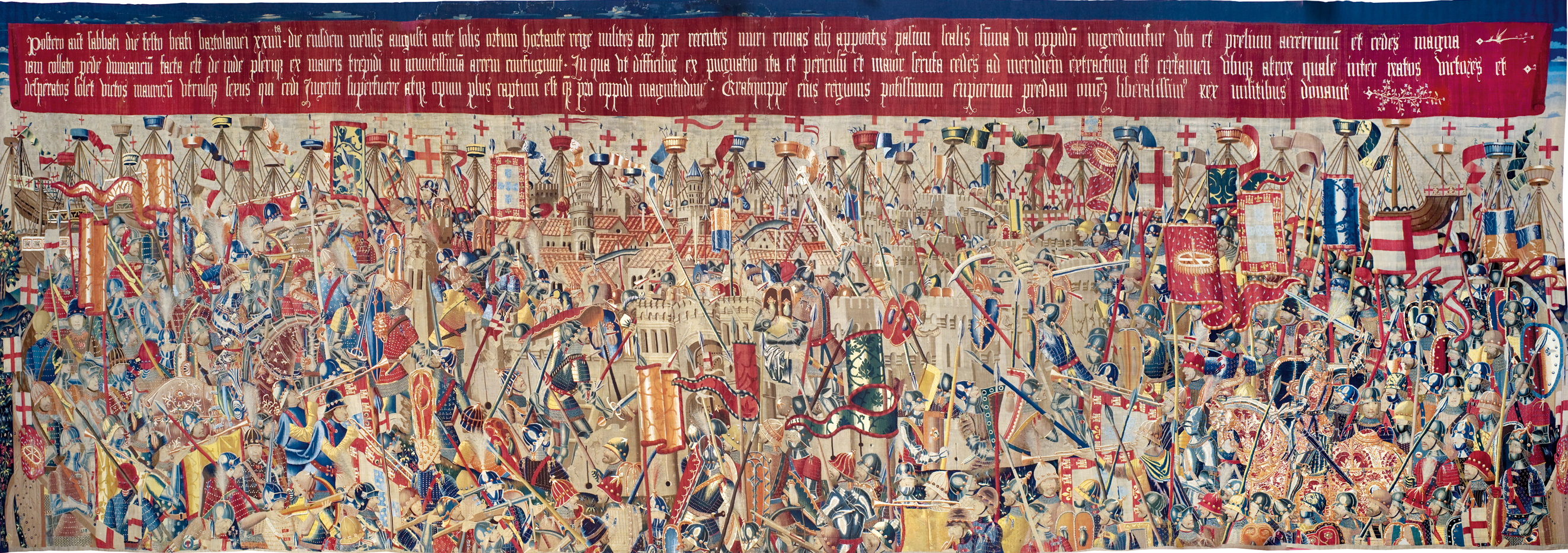
The Portuguese assault of Asilah in 1471, depicted in one of the Pastrana Tapestries.

In 1471 the Portuguese captured Asilah. The Portuguese were commanded by King Afonso V personally, at the head of an army that numbered 30,000 men and 400 vessels of various sizes. The episode is illustrated in the Pastrana Tapestries.

The Count of Viana do Alentejo Dom Henrique de Meneses was appointed first captain of Asilah. He was killed in action by the Magredians in 1480.

During the tenure of captain Álvaro de Faria, in 1488, the Count of Borba Dom Vasco Coutinho distinguished himself in combat ahead of 70 horsemen against the qaid of Ksar el-Kebir, whom he personally fought and captured, despite having been ambushed. The qaid was later ransomed in exchange for 15 000 gold dobras, 15 Christian (POW)s, 20 horses, 18 hostages, the qaids suit of chain mail and a truce. He was later further rewarded by king John II, who promoted him to the post of captain of Asilah in 1490.

Like Portuguese Tangier, Portuguese Asilah received Spanish Jewish families after 1490, after they had fled from Spain into Portugal. The city was then governed by the Count of Borba Dom Vasco Coutinho, who granted asylum to many. Many Jews sought baptism out of fear of the Muslims, while others stuck to Judaism or moved to Portugal later.

Dom Vasco was recalled to Portugal to stand trial in 1495, and his nephew Dom Rodrigo Coutinho briefly replaced him as captain until he was killed later that year in a skirmish against the qaids of Chefchaouen and Tetouan. He was replaced by João de Meneses until being replaced by Dom Vasco who returned still in 1495.

A temporary truce was agreed upon with the Sultan of Fez, and while peace lasted, the villages in the vicinity of Asilah developed and cattle could be raised in safety. The governor of Asilah, Count of Borba Dom Vasco Coutinho earned the respect of both Christians and Muslims alike as a fair governor, hence in 1498 he was selected by King Manuel of Portugal to negotiate with the Sultan of Fez Abu Abd Allah al-Sheikh Muhammad ibn Yahya an extension of the truce. Talks however floundered, because Dom Vasco was outraged at the envoy the Sultan had selected and insulted him as inept.

In 1505, Dom Vasco Coutinho succeeded his brother-in-law Dom João de Meneses as captain of Asilah for a second term. In 1507 Meneses would lead a flotilla of three caravels to recon the harbours of Azemmour, Mamora, Salé and Larache accompanied by Duarte D'Armas, who produced sketches in preparation for future attacks. The following year, Dom João de Meneses led a force of 2400 men and caravels against Azemmour though he failed to capture the city upon landing and fighting its garrison on land.

=== First siege of Asilah, 1508 ===
Aware of the attack being prepared against Azemmour, the Sultan of Fez Abu Abd Allah al-Burtuqali Muhammad ibn Muhammad gathered an army to defend Azemmour and siege Asilah so as to pressure the Portuguese. Dom Vasco got word of the impending siege, and dispatched requests for reinforcements to the Portuguese fortresses of Ceuta, Portuguese Tangier and Alcácer-Ceguer.

The city was besieged by the Sultan of Fez on October 15, 1508. He commanded a large army and was accompanied by the qaid of Chefchaouen Ali ibn Musa ibn Rashid Al-Alam ("Barraxe" in Portuguese) and the qaid of Tétouan Cid Al-Mandri II ("Almandarim" in Portuguese). As almost all the guns in the fortress were inactive, the Moroccoans managed to breach into the city on the second day of the siege, wound captain Dom Vasco with an arrow and force the Portuguese to seek refuge in to the citadel.

The first of Dom João de Meneses' ships arrived on October 17 by midnight but most of it only arrived the following day by mid-day, but after gathering a war-council with the forts officer, landed only on Thursday on Dom Vascos requests. Dom Vascos son-in-law Dom João Mascarenhas landed with a force of 300 men, who managed to secure a beachhead for the landing of further reinforcements. The Portuguese were assisted by Castillians, who dispatched a number of reinforcements to their aid aboard galleys. Warned of the heavy siege on Asilah, King Manuel I moved to Tavira in the southernmost Portuguese region of Algarve, to oversee the organization of reinforcements more closely, while many residents of Algarve volunteered to sail out in the aid of the beleaguered fortress. Seeing no way to overcome Portuguese defences and gradually accosted by an increasing number of Portuguese attacks on his camp, the Sultan of Fez lifted the siege and withdrew with his army.

=== Second siege of Asilah, 1509 ===
After the Sultan of Fez had lifted the siege of Asilah, captain Dom Vasco Coutinho conducted a raid where he succeeded in capturing 30 POWs and numerous cattle from hostile Moroccan towns and cities in the vicinity of Asilah. The qaids of Alcácer Quibir, Jazém, Larache, Tetouan, e Chefchaouen retaliated against Asilah, but failed in causing damage. Outraged at the scope of Portuguese action, the Sultan of Fez decided to lay siege to Asilah once more. As Dom Vasco informed King Manuel of the impending attack, he was provided with numerous reinforcements, and the Sultan was forced to withdraw shortly after arrived.

=== Development of the defenses of Asilah ===
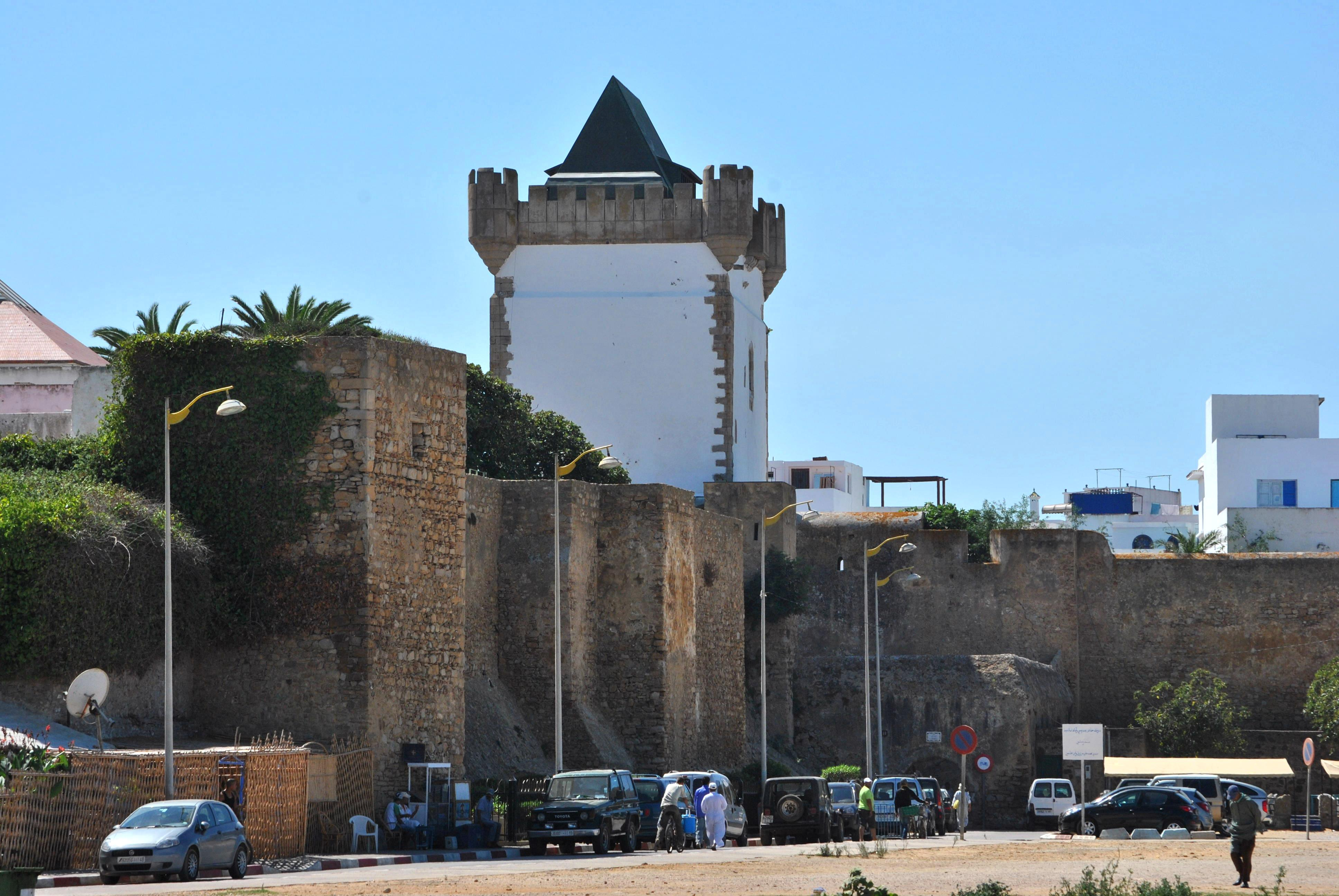
The Portuguese walls of Arzila.

The Portuguese built a stronghold, which was expanded and strengthened from 1509 onwards, with designs by Diogo de Boitaca, who rebuilt the citadel and the wall of its port, combining traditional architectural elements such as the keep and a sea-wall, with more modern ones, such as the bastions with embrasures.

Among the most spectacular bastions and towers standing as representatives of the Portuguese stronghold are the Borj al-Bahr and the Borj al-Kamra. The first was built between 1508 and 1516, stretched out to sea and was used to track the arrival and departure of supplies and reinforcements by ship. The second, dubbed Torre de Menagem in Portuguese was the main tower of the stronghold, and it marks the medina of Asilah with its imposing appearance. Built in 1509 and reproduced on a very famous engraving of Assilah in the 16th century, it featured a double-pitched roof and turrets at the four corners. These architectural features refer to the style of Portuguese military architecture. This tower ensured a public function and more ceremonial than military, conveying the image of power. It is a remnant of the Portuguese governor's residence, which was built over the location of the Moroccan governor's palace in medieval Asilah.

=== Later history ===
In 1515, Asilah was experiencing a great scarcity of cattle, and its captain Dom João Coutinho (son of Dom Vasco Coutinho) conducted a raid a village in the vicinity of Ksar el-Kebir the Portuguese identified as "Tintais", having departed by night with no more than 250 horse from the garrison of Asilah and successfully captured the villages cattle. On the way back, they found that heavy rains had swollen the previously dry rivers so much that the water flowed over the bridges and the trees on the banks. Yet as the garrison of Ksar el Kebir presumed the Portuguese would not have undertaken such a daring raid without the support of the garrison of Portuguese Tangier, they failed to pursue, giving the Portuguese time to cross the rivers and return to Asilah safely.

In 1520 Manuel I of Portugal opened a royal feitoria (trade post) in Arzila, for whose defense a coast-guard fleet called "Squadron of the Strait" was created. The feitoria was provided with cloths, silks, headwear like caps, as well as lacquer, fine embroideries, semi-precious stones and spices which were highly sought after by Moroccan and Jewish merchants; Francisco Ribeiro was appointed as its first feitor, Tomé Pires as clerk, João Queimado as provedor and a branch was opened in Fez, the feitor of which was Francisco Gonçalves. In just a few years, the city became an important commercial and strategic hub on the Saharan gold route.

Starvation befell all of Magreb in 1521, causing a scarcity of foodstuffs in Asilah (and an abundance of slaves, sold into captivity by their family members). The captain of the city Dom João Coutinho successfully raided the region of Ksar el-Kebir, and though pursued by the forces of the qaid of that city he managed to return with 48 POWs and 2000 animals, with which Asilah was restocked.

Plague however befell Asilah in 1522. Captain Dom João Coutinho took various measures meant to keep the city free from pestilence, such as turning back merchant caravans, forbidding raids, arresting anyone who challenged these rules, and forcing people to wash their clothes, however plague nevertheless broke out in January 12. In February the captain evacuated his family and 500 people on a caravel to Tavira, in Portugal. At its height in March, 20 to 25 people died a day, until it subsided in June 24, day of the feast of Saint John. The captain hosted a feast with the remaining inhabitants, and the evacuees returned in September.

In April 1523, Dom João Coutinho travelled to Portugal to attend the funeral of his father, the previous captain of Asilah Dom Vasco Coutinho, and left behind Dom Manuel de Meneses in his place. Dom Manuel was however killed in a skirmish shortly after taking office. Fearing for the safety of the stronghold, the alcaide-mor of Castro Marim and anadel-mor of crossbowmen Garcia de Melo sailed there in person with 600 men, among other volunteers from Portugal and Spain. Melo was however unpopular, and the residents elected the contador Fernão Caldeira as interim captain until Dom João returned.

Arzila was also the birthplace of the warrior "Mulei Amade", who started by fighting the Portuguese, then defected to their side and served under their command in Portuguese India and the Far East.

In April 1529, the Sultan of Fez Abu al-Abbas Ahmad ibn Muhammad attempted to siege Asilah in 1529 unsuccessfully, and destroyed the crops around Asilah for four days. In retaliation the then captain of Asilah António da Silveira set fire the crops of the Moroccans in the region of Ksar el-Kebir between May and June, which caused great damage to the region as the weather conditions were dry and windy. Silveira was succeeded by Dom João Coutinho in October that year.

With the support of King John III, Coutinho signed a truce with qaid of Chefchaouen Muley Ibrahim on behalf of the Sultan of Fez Abu al-Abbas Ahmad ibn Muhammad, by a river the Portuguese identified as Rio Doce. The truce was not respected, and although captain Dom João Coutinho renewed them in 1538, the qaids of Chefchaouen, Tetouan and Ksar el-Kebir persisted in raiding Asilah, until the Sultan of Fez considered truces officially null and void in 1543.

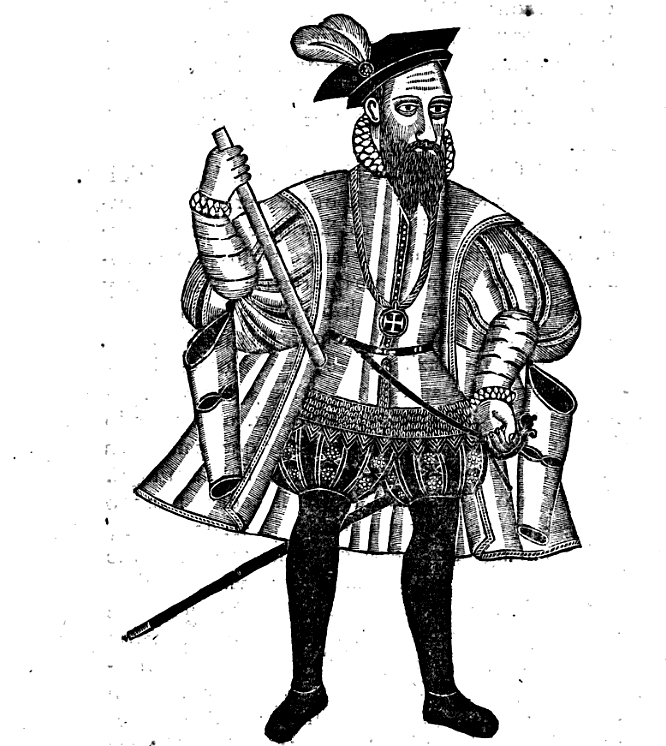
Dom Francisco Coutinho.

On January 20, 1548, the captain of Asilah Dom Francisco Coutinho together with the captain of Portuguese Tangier Francisco Botelho raided the fields of "Alexarife" beyond Ksar el-Kebir, capturing more than 500 cattle and numerous POWs; upon trying to raid the region of Ksar el Kebir later that year, they were engaged by 400 horse and 1000 foot under the qaid of that city, however the Portuguese routed them killing over a hundred, and forced the remainder to seek refuge within the settlement. That same year, the qaids of Ksar el-Kebir, Tetouan and Chefchaouen together attempted to raid the fields around Asilah with a combined force of 2500 horse, however captain Dom Francisco Coutinho sallied out at the head of the garrison and put them to flight.

After Mohammed al-Shaykh unified West Magreb, the captain of Asilah Dom Francisco Coutinho reported to King John III that the sultan, his princes and many qaids were assembling an army to siege Asilah and other Portuguese strongholds. Fearing that the defenses of the city would be inadequate to resist the onslaught, King John III ordered Dom Francisco to speak to the inhabitants, register their belonging and oversee their evacuation to Tangier by sea, returning then to Portugal, while his successor Luís de Loureiro would stay behind with the soldiers and the frontiersmen to evacuate the objects, the artillery and demolish the church of São Bartolomeu as well as the Franciscan monastery.

The city was later recaptured by King Sebastian in 1577. Portugal kept hold of the town until Philip I of Portugal returned Arzila to Ahmad al-Mansur. The Saadians briefly regained control of Asilah, but then lost it to the Spanish.

== List of captains ==
Tenure	Incumbent	Notes
1471–1479	Henrique de Meneses	
1480–1481	Lopo Dias de Azevedo	
1482–1486	João de Meneses	
1486–1488	Álvaro de Faria	
1488–1495	Vasco Coutinho, Count of Redondo	First term. Interim to 1490.
1495	Rodrigo Coutinho	
1495	João de Meneses	First term. Interim.
1495–1501	Vasco Coutinho, Count of Redondo	Second term.
1501–1502	João Coutinho, Count of Redondo	First term. Interim.
1502–1505	João de Meneses	Second term. Interim.
1505–1508	Vasco Coutinho, Count of Redondo	Third term.
1508	Jorge Barreto	
1508–1513	Vasco Coutinho, Count of Redondo	Fourth term.
1513	João Coutinho, Count of Redondo	Second term. Interim.
1513–1514	Vasco Coutinho, Count of Redondo	Fifth term.
1514–1523	João Coutinho, Count of Redondo	Third term. Interim.
1523	Manuel de Meneses	Interim.
1523	Fernão Caldeira	Interim.
1523–1525	João Coutinho, capitão de Arzila, Count of Redondo	Fourth term. Interim.
1525–Oct 1529	António da Silveira	Substitute.
1529–1538	João Coutinho, Count of Redondo	Fifth term. Interim.
1538–1544	Manuel Mascarenhas	
1544–1546	Sebastião de Vargas	
1546–1549	Francisco Coutinho, Count of Redondo	
1549–Aug 1550	Luís de Loureiro	
Aug 1550–1577	Saadi Sultanate rule	
1577–1578	Duarte de Meneses	
1578	Pedro de Mesquita	
1578–1580	Pedro de Silva	
1580–1589	Vasco Fernandes Homem	

== Gallery ==
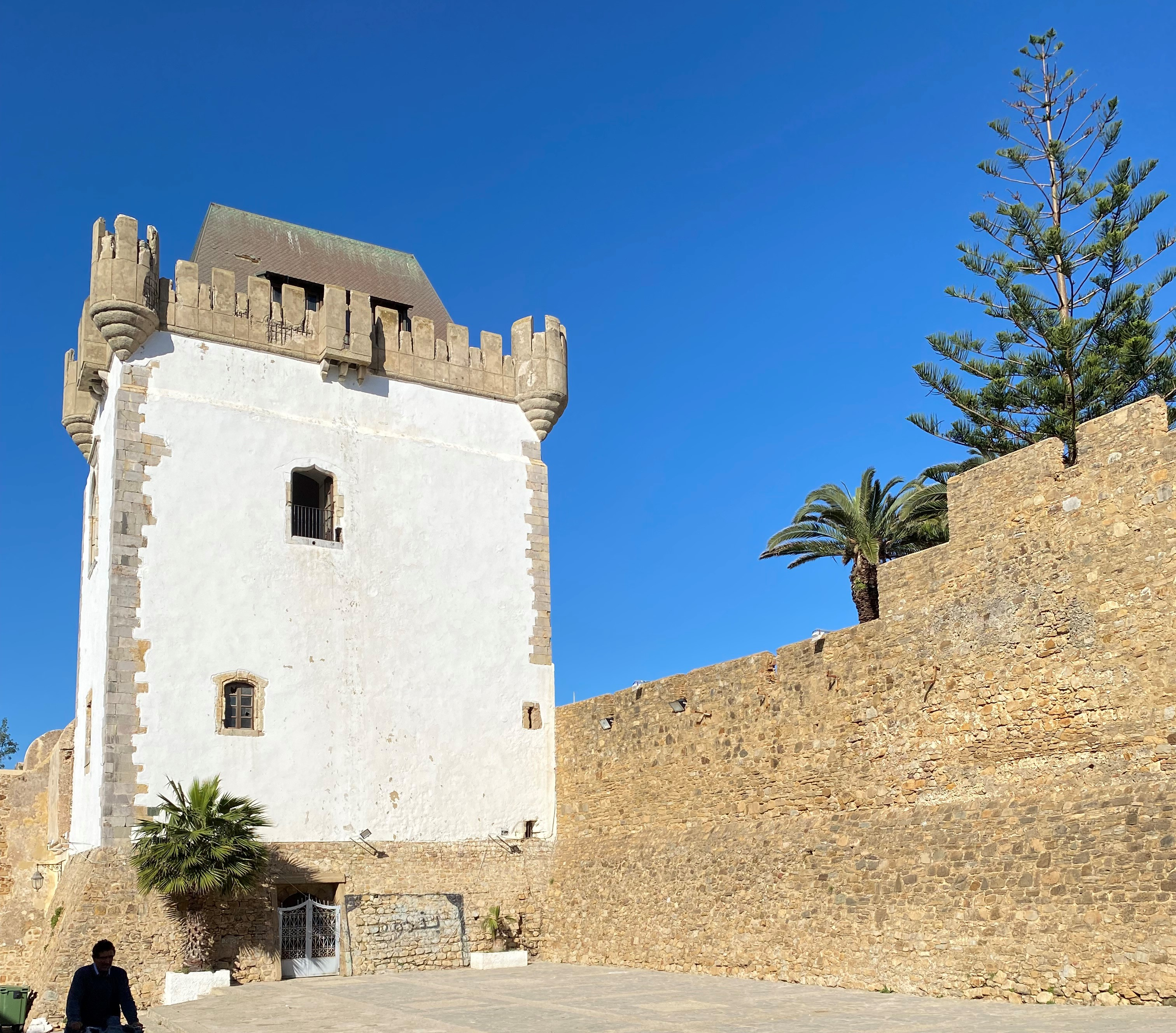
Keep and residence of the Portuguese commander.

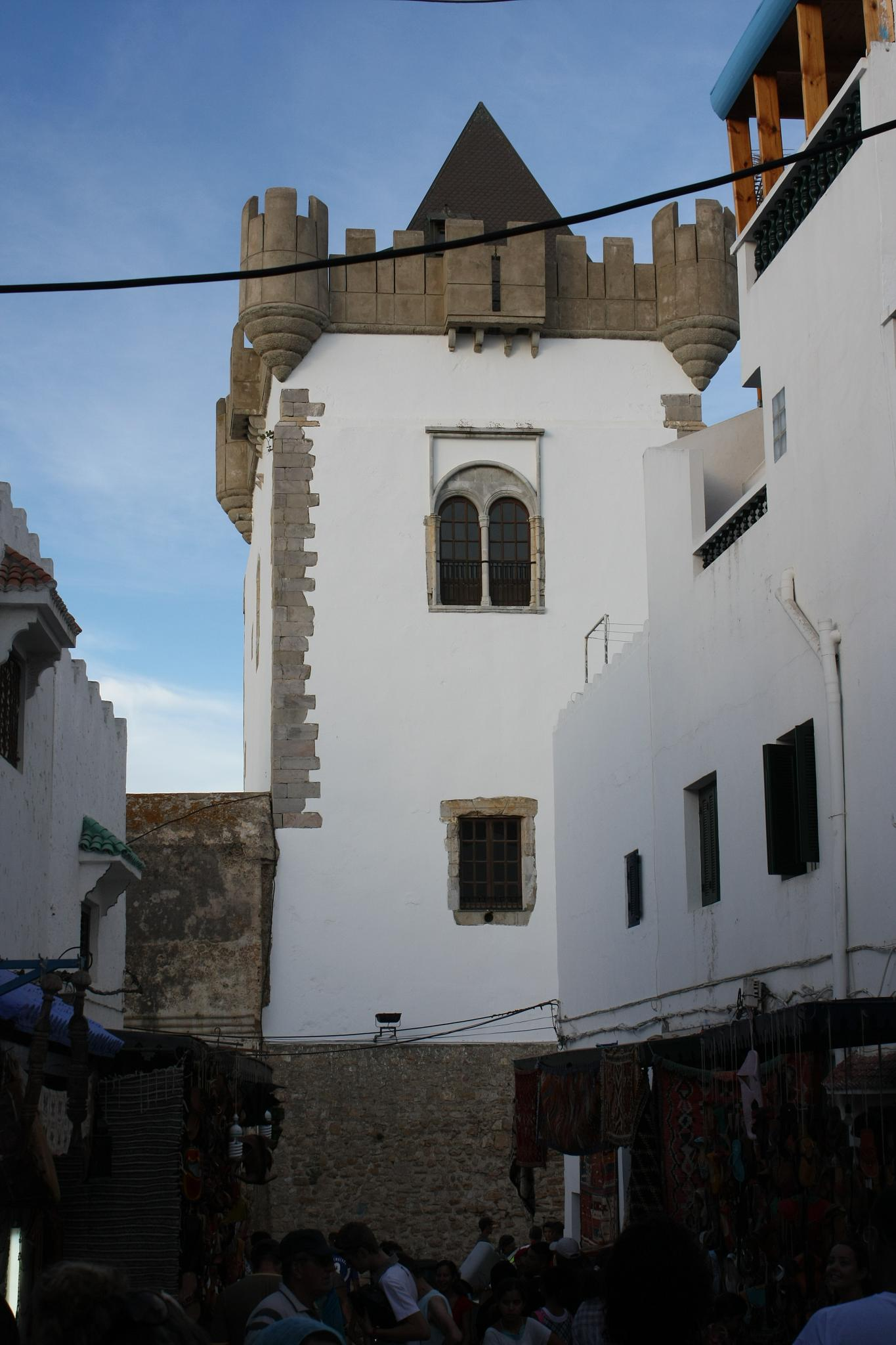
View of the keep from within the medina.

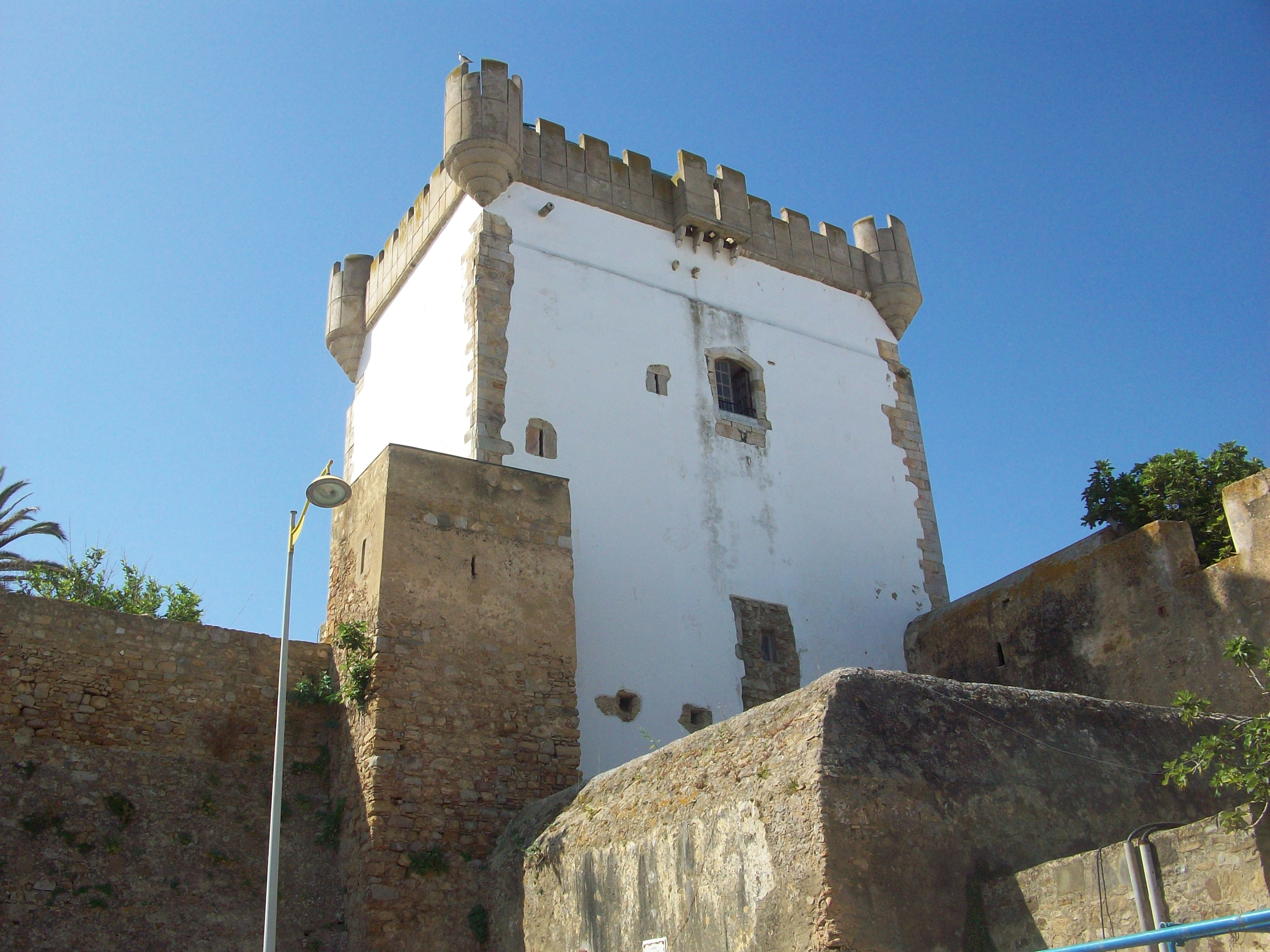
The keep as seen from outside the walls.

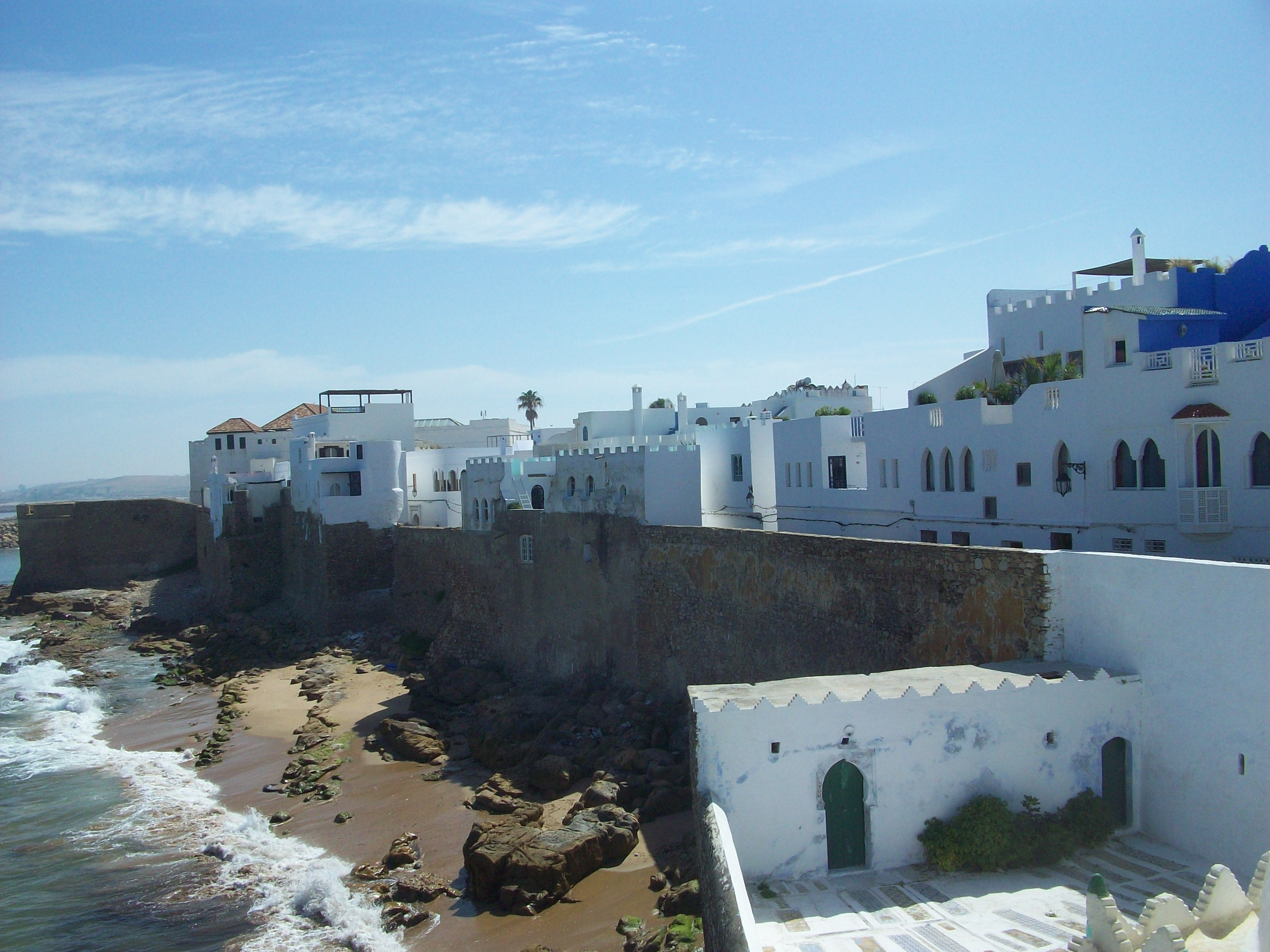
Waterfront walls of Asilah.

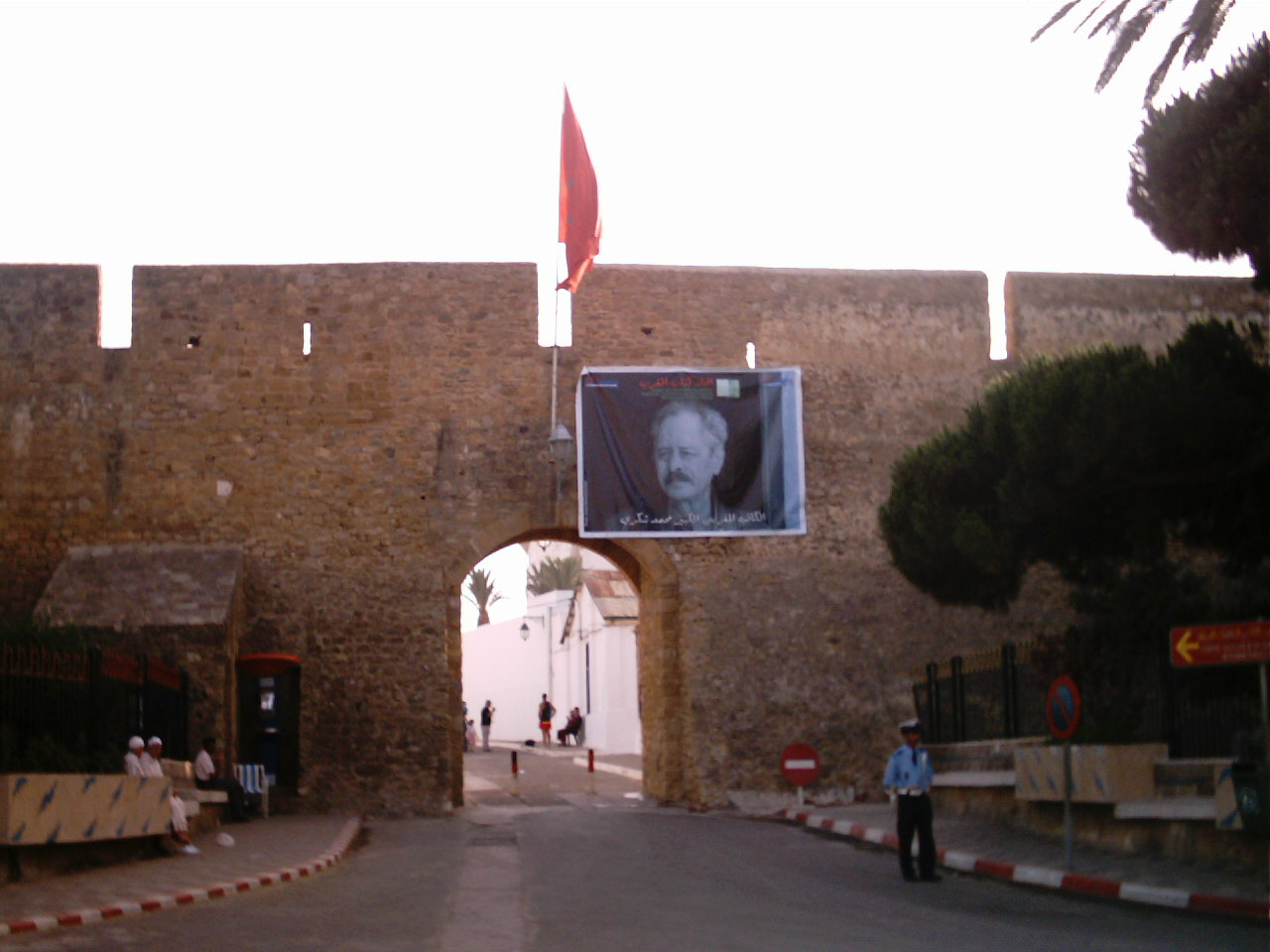
Gateway through the walls of Asilah.

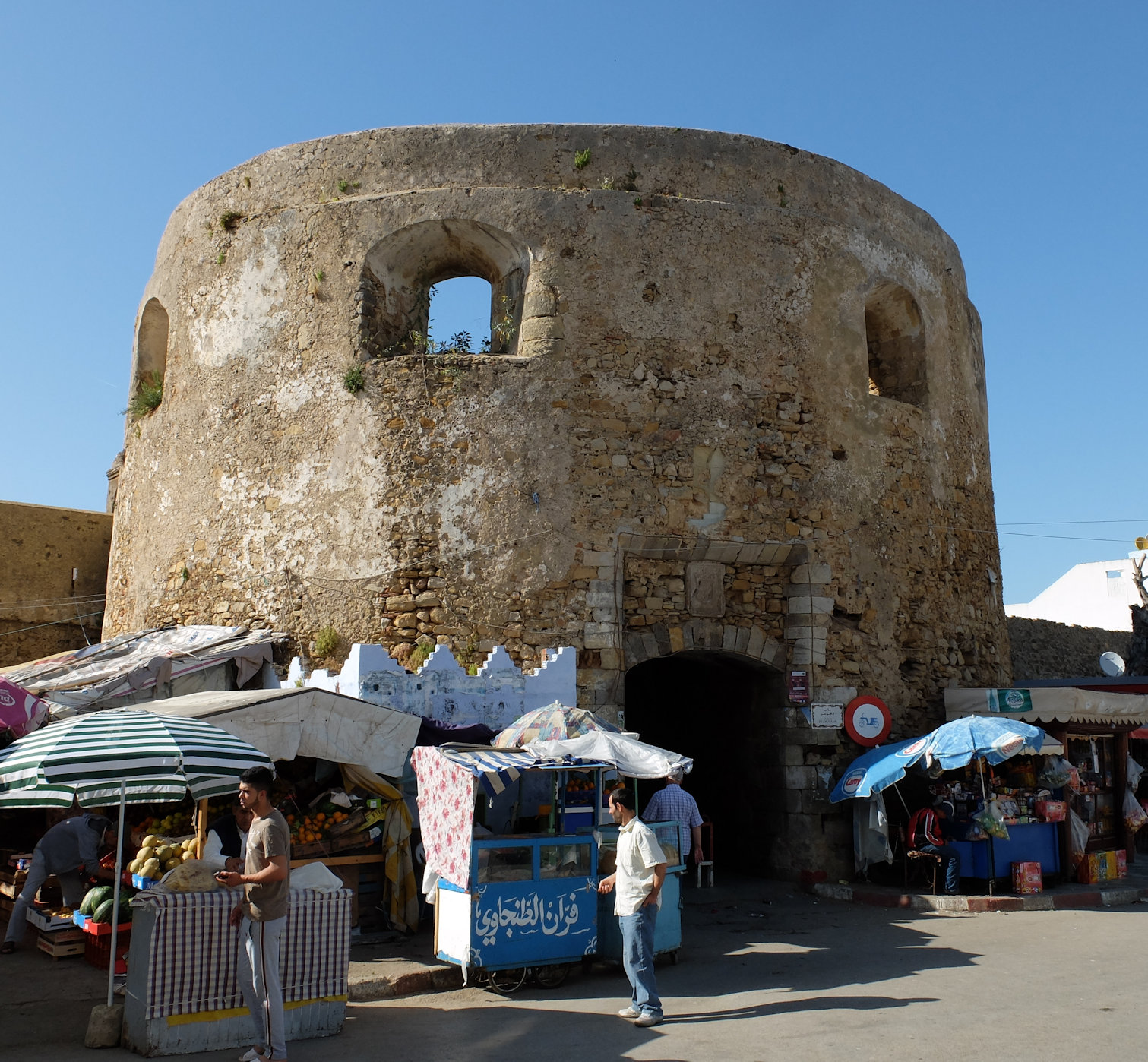
"Bab Homar" tower.

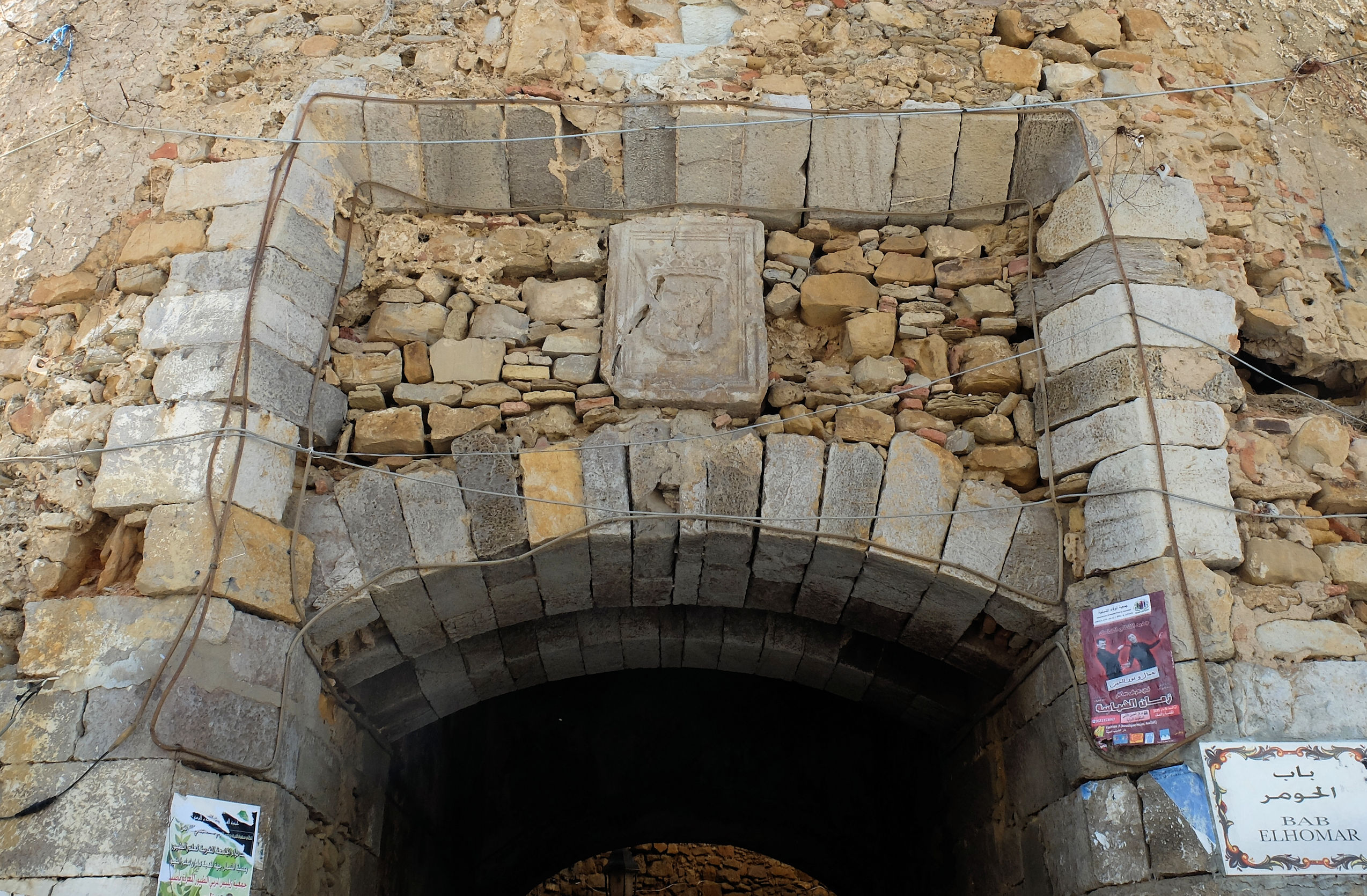
The Portuguese coat of arms.

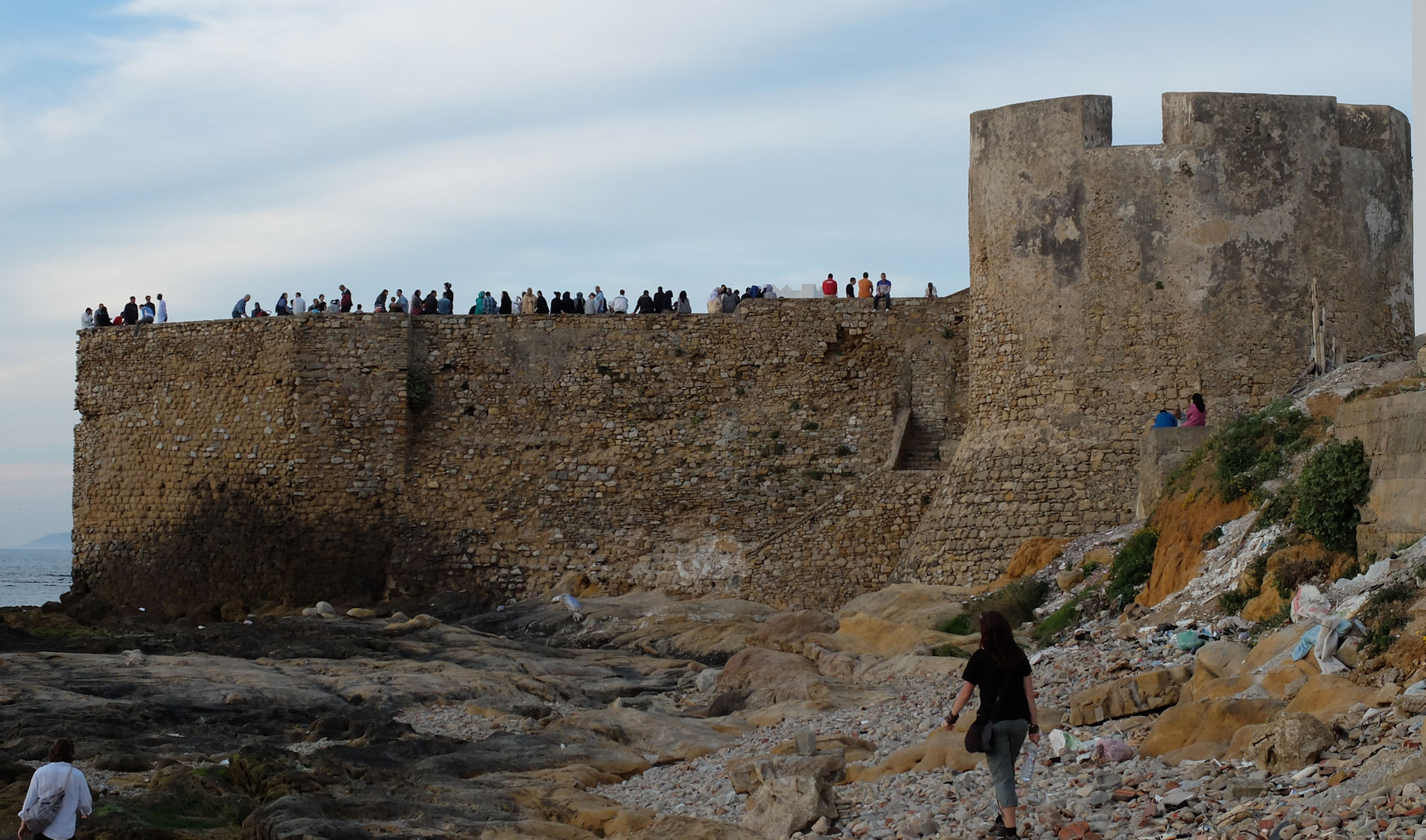
Coastal section of the walls and bastion.

== See also ==
- Pastrana Tapestries
- Portuguese Tangier
