= Count of Loulé =

Noble title in the Kingdom of Portugal

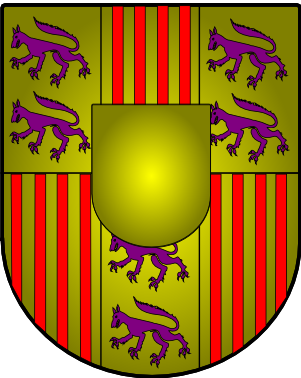
Coat of Arms of Henrique de Menezes, 1st Count of Loulé (Vilalobos and Lima behind, with Menezes on the top.

Count of Loulé (in Portuguese Conde de Loulé) was a Portuguese title of nobility granted to Henrique de Menezes by royal decree issued on November 12, 1471, by King Afonso V of Portugal.

Henrique de Menezes was the son of Duarte de Menezes, 3rd Count of Viana (do Alentejo) and, therefore, grandson of Pedro de Menezes, founding father of the House of Vila Real.

This new title granting was based in an agreement in which Henrique would receive the county of Loulé, returning the county of Valença to the Crown.

== List of counts of Loulé (1471) ==
1. Henrique de Menezes, also 1st Count of Valença, 3rd Count of Viana (da Foz do Lima) and 4th Count of Viana (do Alentejo);
2. Beatrice of Menezes, his daughter, married to Francisco Coutinho, 4th Count of Marialva;
3. Guiomar Coutinho, their daughter, also 5th Countess of Marialva. Married to Infante Ferdinand, Duke of Guarda.

== See also ==
- Count of Valença
- Count of Viana (do Alentejo)
- Count of Viana (da Foz do Lima)
- Count of Marialva
- List of countships in Portugal

== Bibliografia ==
"Nobreza de Portugal e Brasil" Vol II, pages 693/694. Published by Zairol, Lda., Lisbon, 1989.
