= Count of Viana do Alentejo =

Noble title in the Kingdom of Portugal

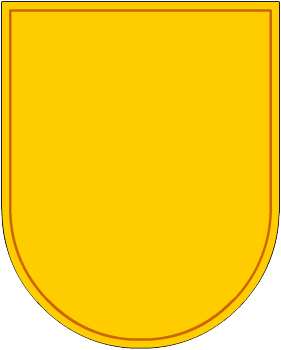
Coat of Arms of João Afonso Telo de Menezes, 1st Count of Viana (do Alentejo).

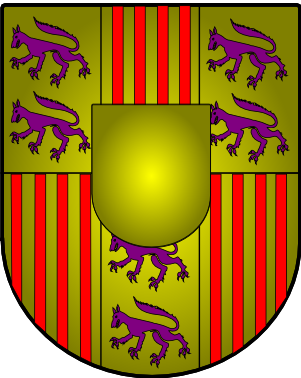
Coat of arms of the 2nd, 3rd and 4th Counts of Viana (do Alentejo).

Count of Viana (do Alentejo) was a Portuguese title of nobility granted to D. João Afonso Telo, who was the second son of João Afonso Telo, 4th Count of Barcelos and a cousin of Queen Leonor Teles, by King Ferdinand I of Portugal pursuant to a royal decree dated 19 March 1373.

The first count belonged to one of the most powerful families among the Portuguese nobility and even though he supported Beatrice of Portugal's party during the 1383-1385 Crisis, the county of Viana (do Alentejo) was inherited by his descendants.

== List of counts of Viana (do Alentejo) ==
1. João Afonso Telo, (c. 1330-1384);
2. Pedro de Menezes (c.1370-1437), his son, also 1st Count of Vila Real;
3. Duarte de Menezes (1414–1464), his natural son, also 2nd Count of Viana (da Foz do Lima);
4. Henrique de Menezes (c.1450-1480), his son, also 3rd Count of Viana (da Foz do Lima) and 1st Count of Loulé.

== See also ==
- Count of Viana (da Foz do Lima)
- Count of Loulé
- List of countships in Portugal

== Bibliography ==
- "Nobreza de Portugal e Brasil" Vol III, pages 478/480. Published by Zairol, Lda., Lisbon, 1989.
- Braamcamp Freire, Anselmo (1921). Livro primeiro dos Brasões de Sintra (in Portuguese). Coimbra: Imprensa da Universidade. OCLC 794223590.
