= Henrique de Meneses, 4th Count of Viana =

Portuguese nobleman

Henrique de Meneses
- Count
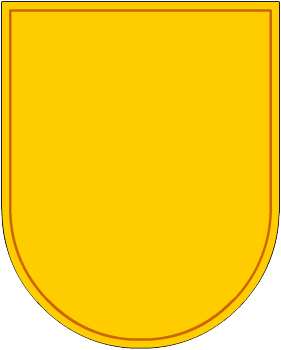
- Born: 1450; Kingdom of Portugal
- Died: 1480 (aged 29–30); Alcácer-Ceguer?
- Occupation: Military

Henrique de Meneses (1450–1480) was a Portuguese nobleman, Count of Viana and Count of Loulé. In 1471, he was a captain in the conquest of Asilah.

Henrique was born in Portugal, the son of Duarte de Menezes, 3rd Count of Viana and Isabel de Castro. His wife was Guiomar de Bragança, daughter of Fernando I, Duke of Braganza and Joana de Castro.
