= Conquest of Asilah =

Moroccan-Portuguese conflict of 1471

- Part of Moroccan–Portuguese conflicts
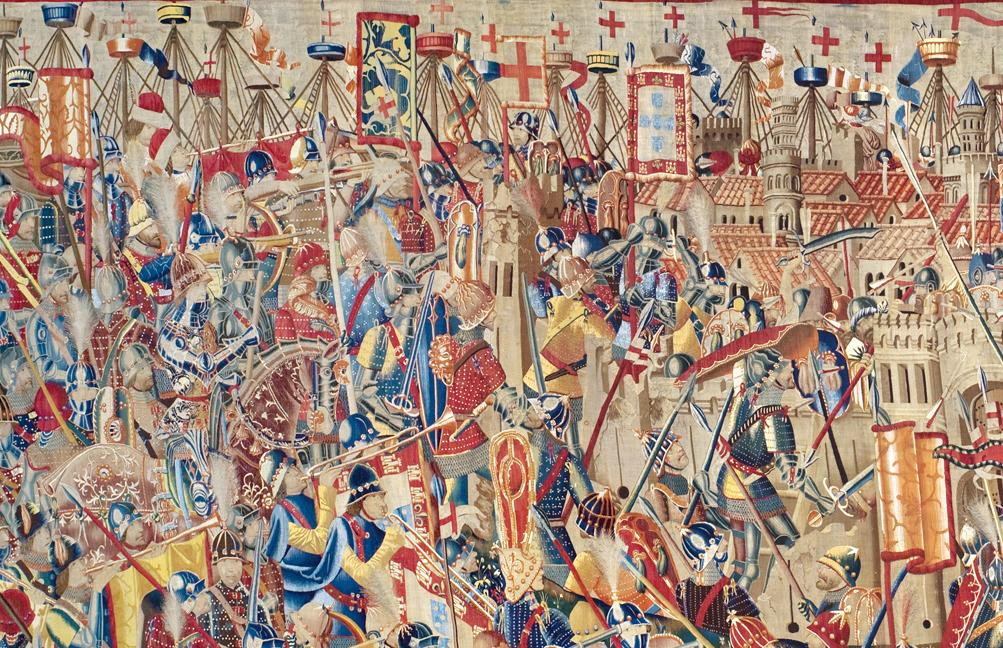
- The Portuguese assault on Asilah depicted on a 15th century tapestry.
Date	24 August 1471
Location	Asilah, Morocco
Result	Portuguese victory
Territorial changes	Establishment of Portuguese Asilah

Belligerents
Kingdom of Portugal	Wattasid Morocco

Commanders and leaders
Afonso V of Portugal; Prince John	Mohamed Cheikh

Strength
30,000 men 400 ships	Unknown

Casualties and losses
Unknown	2,000 killed 5,000 captured

The Portuguese conquest of Asilah (Arabic: أصيلة، أرزيلة; Portuguese: Arzila) was a campaign led by King Afonso V in modern Morocco from the Wattasids on 24 August 1471.

== History ==
Continuing with his policy of expansion of the Portuguese territories in Morocco, and with the spirit of Crusade against the Muslims always present, King Afonso V of Portugal initially set plans to conquer Tangier, but subsequently decided to conquer Arzila.

Departing from the Portuguese town of Lagos with an army of about 30,000 men and 400 ships, Afonso V arrived at the Moroccan coast on the afternoon of 22 August 1471. The Portuguese King summoned his Council and decided to attack Asilah on the morning of the following day. There was a terrible storm and a number of Portuguese ships were lost. It poured rain the entire three days of the siege.

The storm was so severe it prevented the ships from laying down a cannon bombardment, and only two pieces of heavy artillery were brought to shore. After a troubled disembarkation that resulted in the death of more than 200 men caused by strong winds and waves, Afonso's army reached the shore and laid siege to the city of Asilah, conquering it after a hard battle on 24 of August, 1471.

The Count of Valença, Henrique de Menezes, was appointed as the first Portuguese governor of Asilah by King Afonso V.

The victory at Asilah paved the way for the unopposed conquest of Tangier four days later on 28 August 1471.

== Aftermath ==
Asilah was conquered and looted by the portuguese. Among the prisoners taken were two wives and a son of the Wattasid leader Mohammed ash-Shaykh, much of whose treasure also fell into portuguese hands

== Pastrana Tapestries ==
In the late 15th century, a set of four large tapestries was commissioned to commemorate the battle. They were woven by Flemish weavers in Tournai, Belgium. The tapestries are notable highly for their portrayal of a contemporary event. The works are regarded as among the finest Gothic tapestries in existence.
