= Castle of Alcoutim (Old) =

Portuguese castle

(Old) Castle of Alcoutim
- Castelo Velho de Alcoutim
- Faro, Algarve, Algarve in Portugal

Site information
- Type: Castle
- Owner: Portuguese Republic
- Open to the public: Public

Location
- Coordinates: 37°28′51.76″N 7°28′17.59″W

Site history
- Built: 8th-9th century

The (Old) Castle of Alcoutim (Portuguese: Castelo Velho de Alcoutim) is a medieval castle built onto a prehistoric castro located in the civil parish of Alcoutim, municipality of the same name, in the Portuguese Algarve. About one kilometre (0.62 mi) north of the town of Alcoutim, the old castle is one of the more important Islamic military structures in the Algarve: it is both an important historical visit for tourists and historiographically significant to the Muslim occupation of the region. Commonly confused with the younger Castle of Alcoutim, the old castle was abandoned in the 11th century, but its exploration and excavation was elaborated by archaeologists in the 20th century.

== History ==
The initial construction occurred in the 8th-9th century, although the space was occupied since the Bronze Age. The option to locate in this location, and not solely in the town of Alcoutim, has never been clearly explained. Likely, its conditions (the level of visibility) and the use of the original Roman structures (identified in the neighbouring town of Lourinhã) played a part in the early construction of this fortress. What is certain is that the Old Castle was the centre of a vast territory, influenced by the river activities along the Guadiana, and on the other hand, by the level of mineral exploration in the region. A few lithic fragments, for example, were found in the Muslim living spaces of the structure. It was the discovery of a few graves nearby from this period, during the archaeological excavations begun in 1986, that contributed to a better understanding of the site's roots. Similar excavations at various levels on the site, allowed the determination of a range of occupation beginning with the Bronze Age and extending into the 11th century.

At one point, which coincided with the new Islamic powers during the Emirate of Córdoba, the fortress was constructed. Later, during the Caliphate and early taifas, the local infrastructures were altered, resulting in the expansion of some living quarters into the defensive walls. At the beginning of the Middle Ages, the site could have also become a refuge site, protected by the rocky cliffs that encircled the site. The defensive systems were altered over time, as is evident in the late construction of the tower protecting the main gate.

Abandoned during the 9th century, for reasons still unclear, the Castle did not recuperate its military importance nor role. With the Reconquista of the Algarve (11th century), the new Christian powers privileged the village of Alcoutim, where they constructed a new castle and community, and abandoned the old castle altogether. Yet, by the late-Middle Age, there were still some need for the old fort, necessitating some "modern" reforms to the site, including new Gothic gates.

Between 1986 and 1993, archaeological excavations were undertaken onsite by Helena Catarino.

On 7 October 1996, the site was classified as a Imóvel de Interesse Público (Property of Public Interest).

In the 2000s (decade), public works to requalify the site, supported by the Programa Operacional de Cooperação Transfronteiriça Portugal-Espanha (Portugal-Spain Trans-frontier Cooperation/Operational Program), and integrated into Project Guaditer. These initiatives lead to the construction of stainless-steel guard-rails and platforms to allow visitors to view the structure and landscape in 2011.

== Architecture ==
The castle is located in a rural location, on the hilltop with dense vegetation, shrubs and bushes, structured in relation to the Guadiana River with good visibility.

The military architectural group consists of two enclosures, both rectangular. The upper, that corresponds to the alcazaba, occupies an area of 704 square metres (7,580 ft^{2}) and includes various rectangular towers, although none of them are positioned on the angles. Two doors give access to the interior, that includes a 560 × 250 centimetres (220 × 98 in) opening to the cistern, walls of 70–90 centimetres (28–35 in) thickness, and compartments (likely used as residences) constructed of schist masonry.

The second line of walls were constructed to protect the settlement that developed around the interior walls. It is also a rectangular layout, similarly reinforced by towers, and includes a gate that permits communication with the habitable area in its periphery (the area until the river). The second redoubt, which is defended by various schist towers, and protected by rectangular structures of ashlar schist, of which a few vestiges remain in the west. Sections of the wall are made of blocks of greywacke and shale mixed with soil and clay, with a thickness of 2 metres (6.6 ft). Along this wall are towers: two with an irregular plan, about 5 × 5 metres (16 × 16 ft) and two of approximately 3 × 3 metres (9.8 × 9.8 ft).

This rational structure, imposed a structural geometry to the terrain, which is part of the Umayyad castle typology. Archaeologist Helena Maria Gomes Catarino, drew parallels between Alcoutim and other castles of the Eastern Algarve, referring to the fortress of Almiserát (Alicante) in particular, constructed in the 10th century, and others with identical characteristics. This attribution is reinforced by the morphology of its construction: a base of irregular lose stone, with cemented stone and earth, typical of other Umayyad military installations of the time.

There is still a lack of archaeologically-precise evidence. From the "landfill" around the cliffs, fragments of ceramics, many cooked in an irregular kiln, and a few decorative remains that attest to medieval period (likely the end of a Visigoth occupation and/or beginning of a Muslim intervention). An excavation of the living quarters reveal fragments of tile, ceramic and a few metal objects, that point to a chronology from the end of the Emirate period of the Muslim occupation. Over the wall, of one of the rectangular compartments, constructed in the centre of the castle during the Caliphate period, archaeologists retrieved a green, manganese bowl. Another layer retrieved from the excavations, although for the most part characteristic of the Caliphate period, also included ceramics from the 11th century.
