= Menhirs of Lavajo =

Group of standing stones in Alcoutim, Portugal

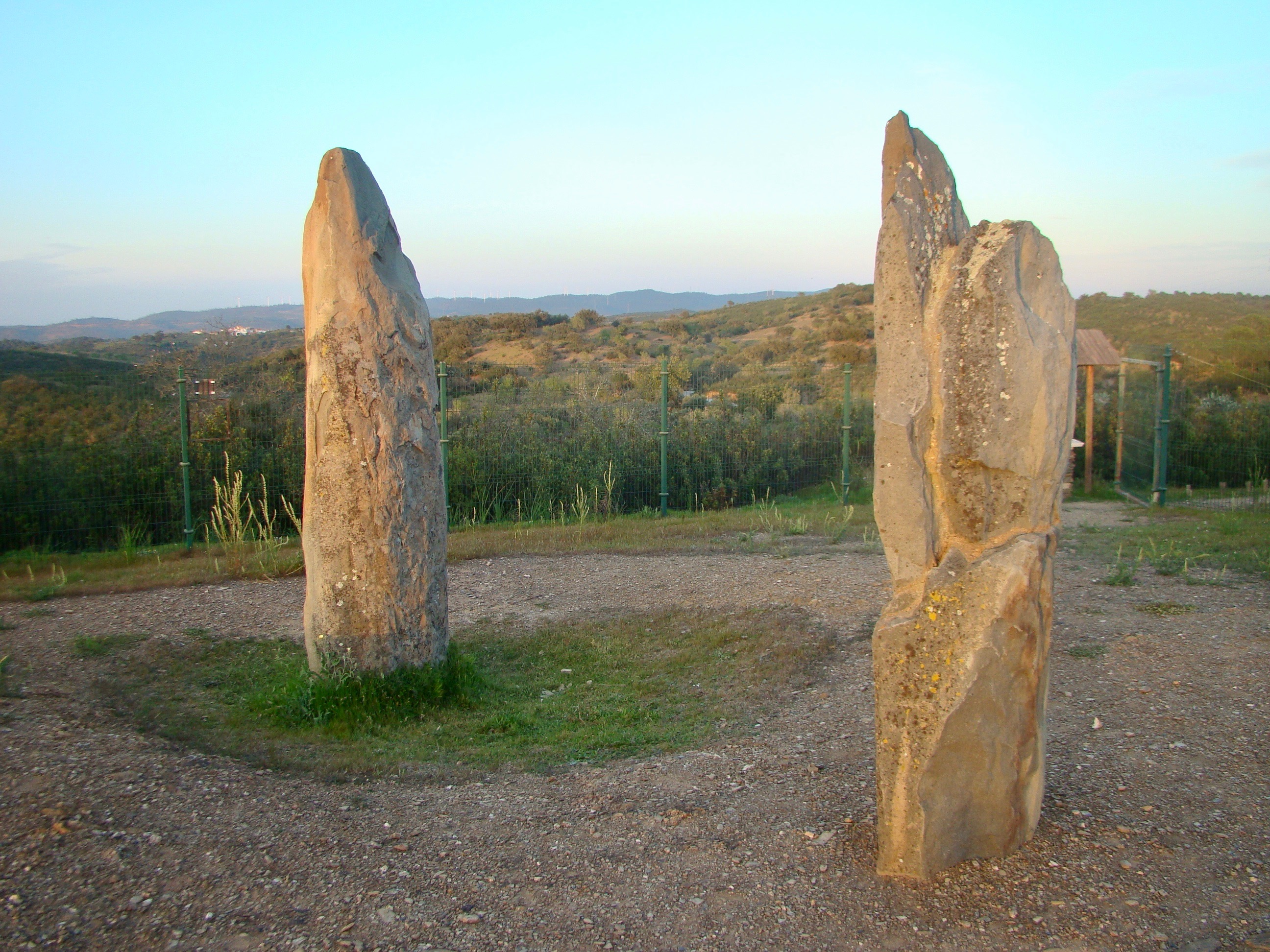
- The Menhirs in 2019
- Interactive map of Menhirs of Lavajo
- 37°30′5″N 7°32′6″W
- Type: Menhirs
- Location: Faro, Portugal

History
- Built: c. 3150 BC

Site notes
- Height: 3.14 m (10.3 ft)
- Discovered: 1998
- Owner: Portuguese Republic
- Public access: Private; IC27; 1.2 kilometres (0.75 mi) northeast of the village of Afonso Vicente. Located near the municipal frontier and the border with Spain (delimited by the Guadiana)

The Menhirs of Lavajo (Portuguese: Menires de Lavajo) are a group of menhirs, located in the civil parish of Alcoutim e Pereiro in the municipality of Alcoutim, Portuguese Algarve.

== History ==
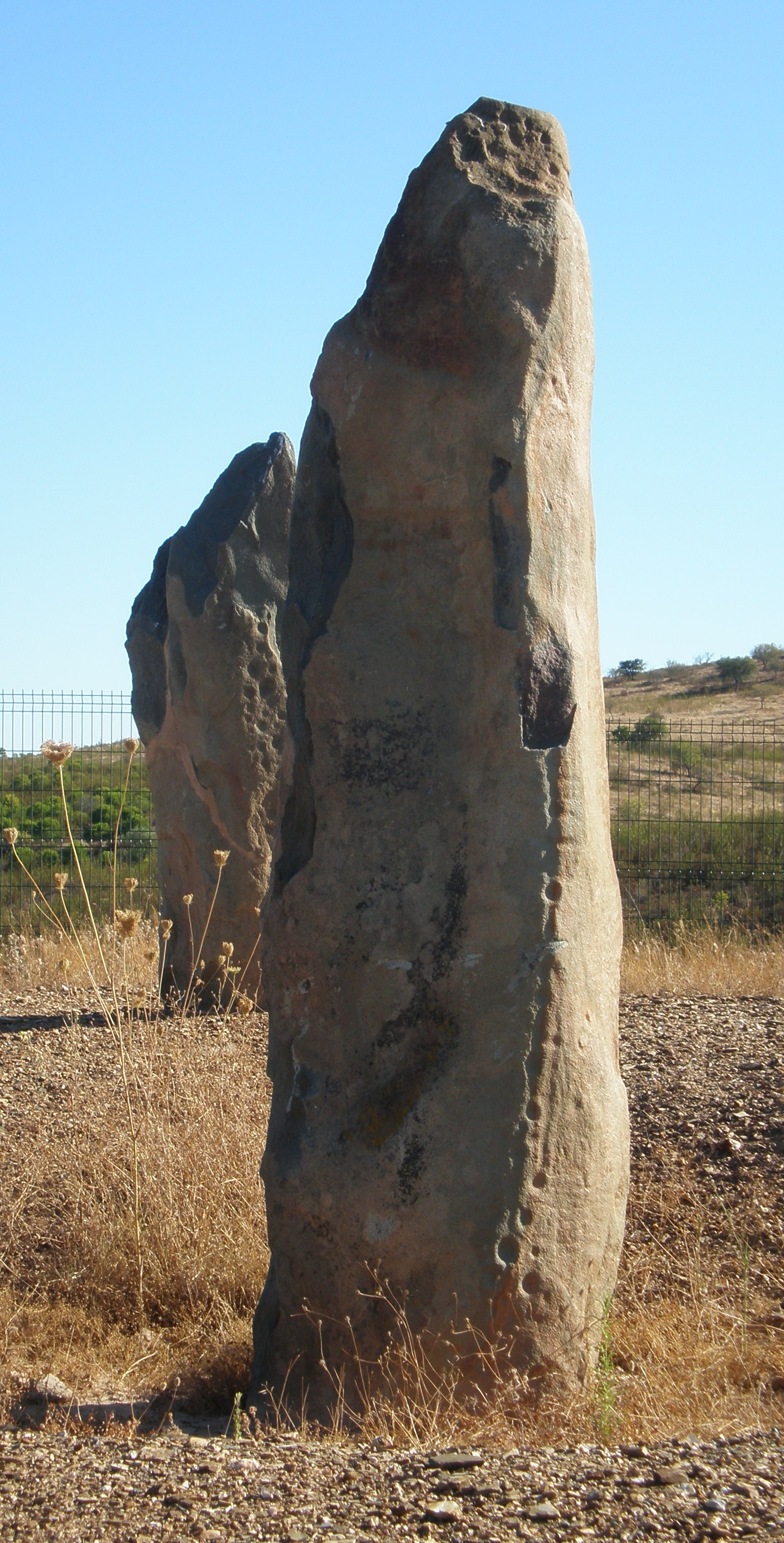
The largest menhir of the megalithic group

These structures are territorial marks or define sacred spaces from the Late Neolithic or Chalcolithic period constructed sometime between 3500 and 2800 BC.

The first excavations in 1998 revealed the existence of not only the large menhir, but fragments of the two small menhirs. These menhirs raised the possibility that the group was an intentional alignment of these structures. One of these structures were eventually stored in the archaeological museum in Alcoutim.

== Architecture ==
A rural group, located on a small 155 metres (509 ft) hilltop, between the Lavajo valley and the ravine of the same name. The area is encircled by fence.

Part of an aligned group of megalithic religious structures. Consists of three carved menhirs, with the largest decorated with carvings and circles. The largest (Lavajo I) is 3.14 metres (10.3 ft) high, dark grey phallic-form structure, with its surface stained in brown. Its carvings combine decoration arranged along a longitudinal groove, with circles and other elements. The other two menhirs (Lavajo II) located 250 metres (820 ft), decorated in a similar fashion, with one decorated by perforated circle.
