= Sanlúcar =

Sanlúcar may refer to:

- Sanlúcar de Barrameda, a city in the Province of Cádiz, Spain
- Sanlúcar de Guadiana, a village in the Province of Huelva, Spain
- Sanlúcar la Mayor, a city in the Province of Seville, Spain
- Sanlúcar de Albaida, former name of the village of Albaida del Aljarafe, Seville, Spain
- Manolo Sanlúcar (1943–2022), Spanish flamenco guitarist
