= Alcoutim (parish) =

- Civil parish
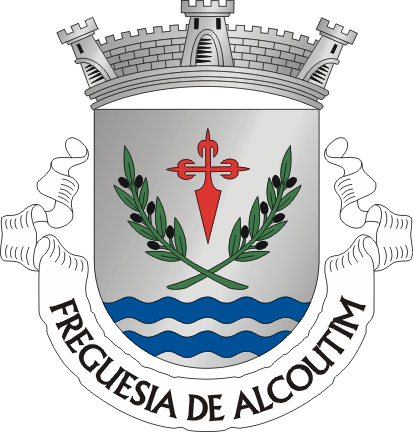
- Coat of arms

- Location in Portugal
- Coordinates: 37°28′N 7°28′W
- Country: Portugal
- Region: Algarve
- Intermunic. comm.: Algarve
- District: Faro
- Municipality: Alcoutim
- Disbanded: 2013

Area
  - Total: 129.60 km^{2} (50.04 sq mi)

Population (2001)
  - Total: 1,099
  - Density: 8.480/km^{2} (21.96/sq mi)
- Time zone: UTC+00:00 (WET)
  - Summer (DST): UTC+01:00 (WEST)

Alcoutim is a former civil parish, located in the municipality of Alcoutim, Algarve, Portugal. In 2013, the parish merged into the new parish Alcoutim e Pereiro.

== Main sites ==
- Alcoutim Castle
- Roman village of Montinho das Laranjeiras
- Alcoutim Old Castle
- Nossa Senhora da Conceição Church
