= Museu de Mertola =

Museu de Mertola is an archaeological museum complex in Mertola, Portugal. Mertola has three main museum sites. The Roman museum (the Roman city was Myrtilis Iulia and Portugal then Lusitania) is in the Town Hall building and includes a part reconstructed villa from the 3rd and 4th century and a collection of mosaics with strong Byzantine influence depicting mythological and other scenes. There are also finds from Roman premises that were used for living but also as guest houses (tabernae), which can be explained by the proximity to the Roman harbour.

The Islamic collection is an archive of ceramic objects (9th to 13th-centuries).

The paleo-Christian site includes a Roman cryptoporticus and a 6th-century baptistery. Other finds include Roman funerary art from the Roman and late Roman period excavated from beneath a small chapel dedicated to Saint Sebastian built in the 16th century.

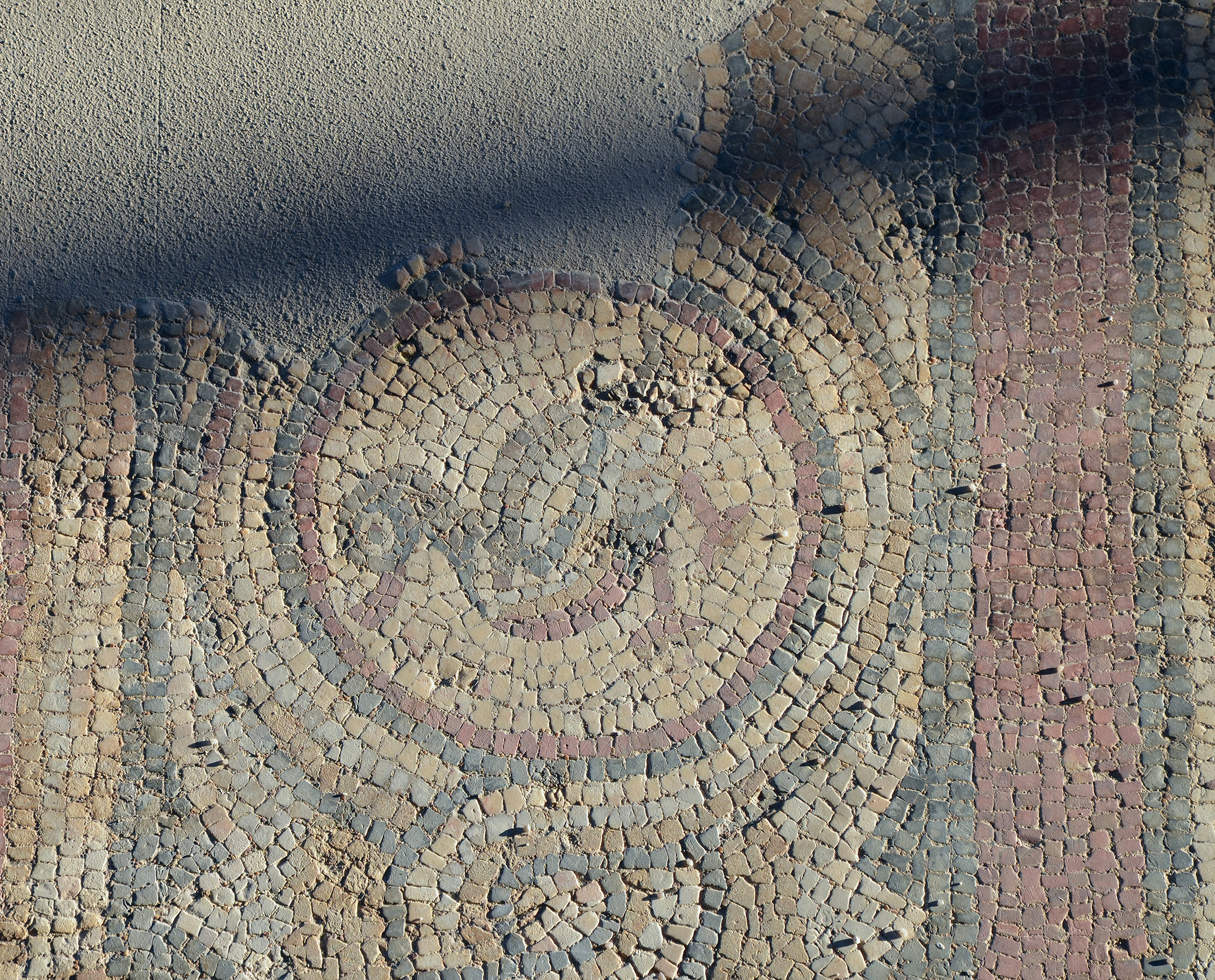
Mosaic floor

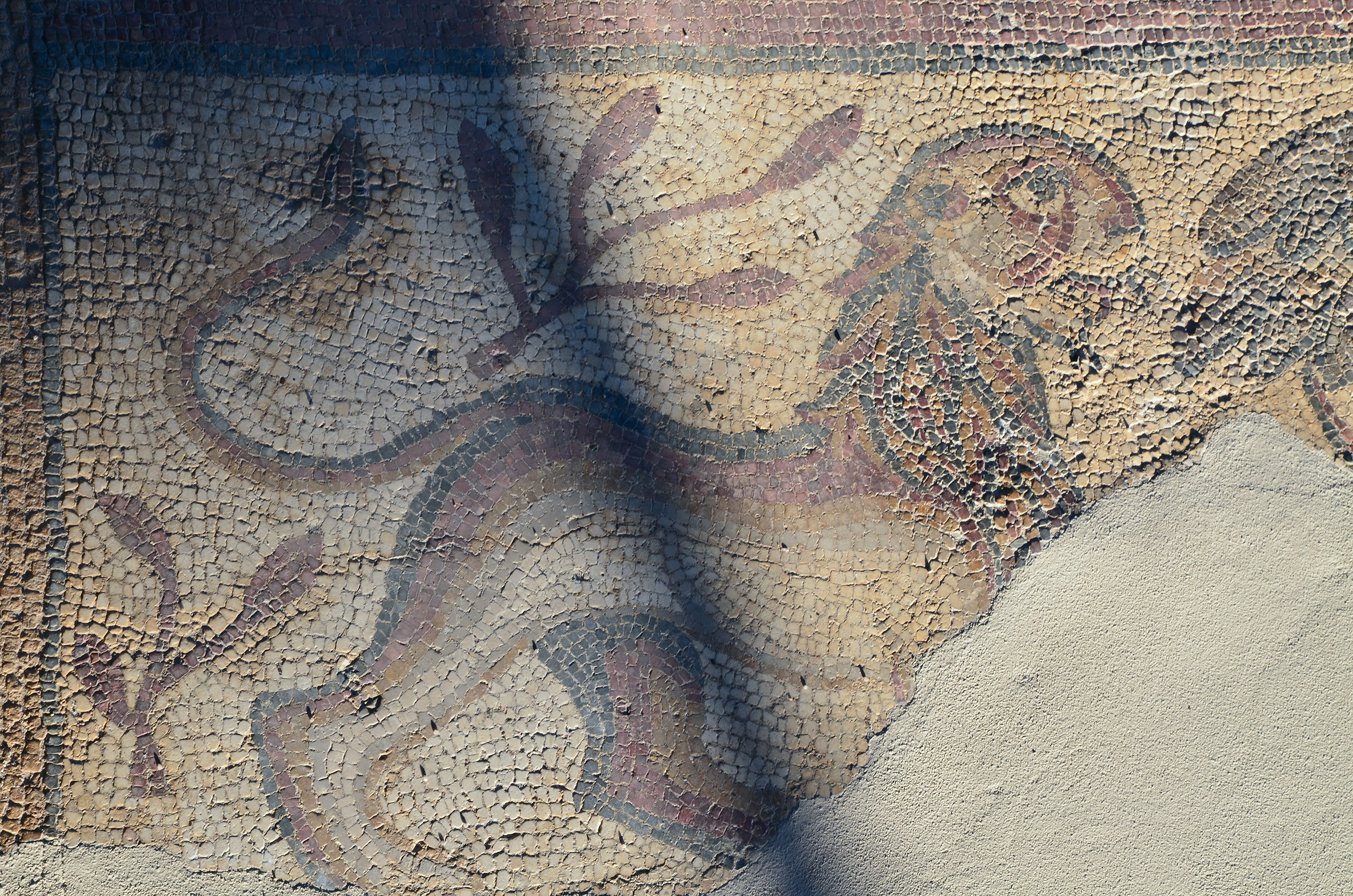
Mosaic floor

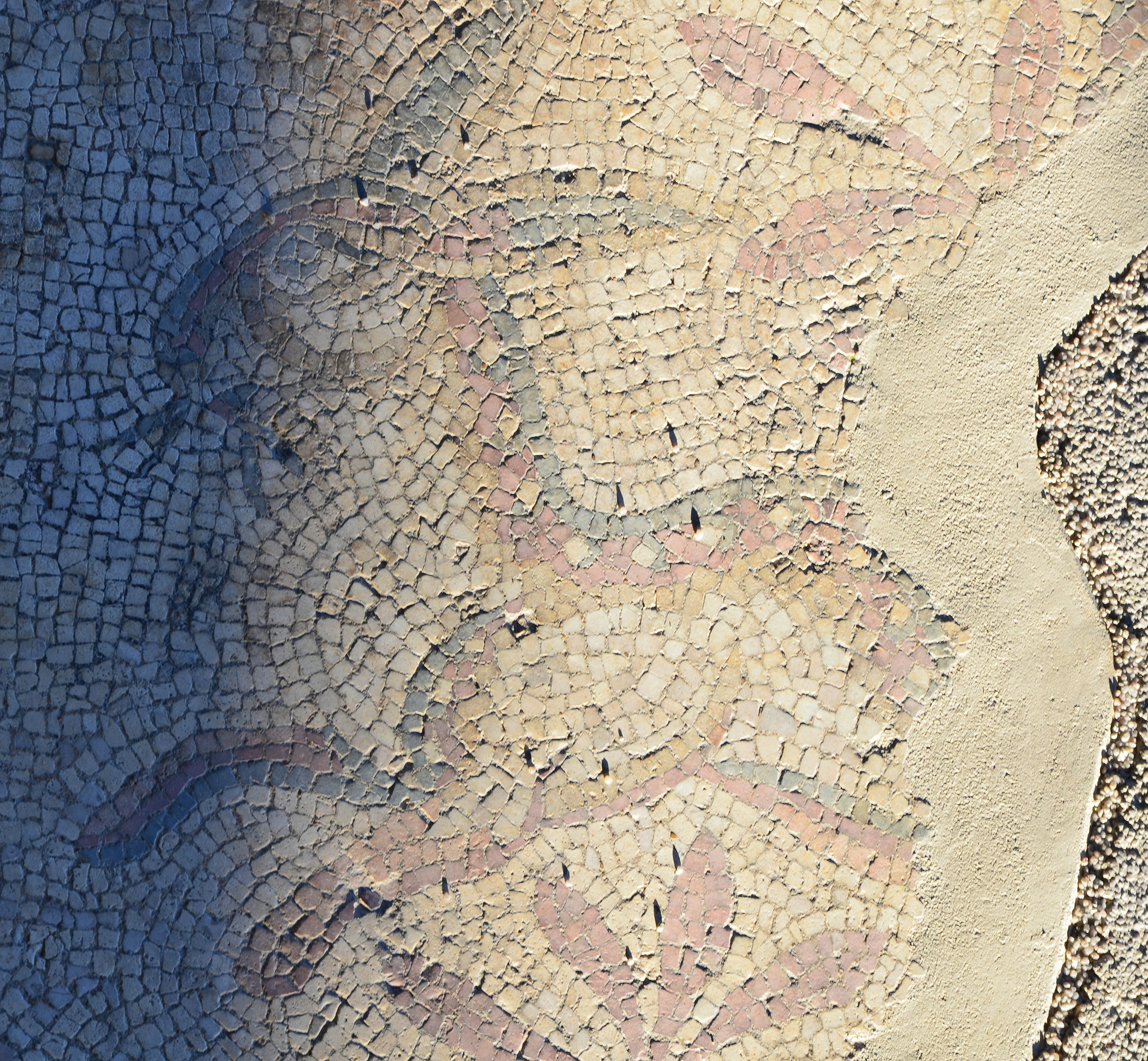
Mosaic floor

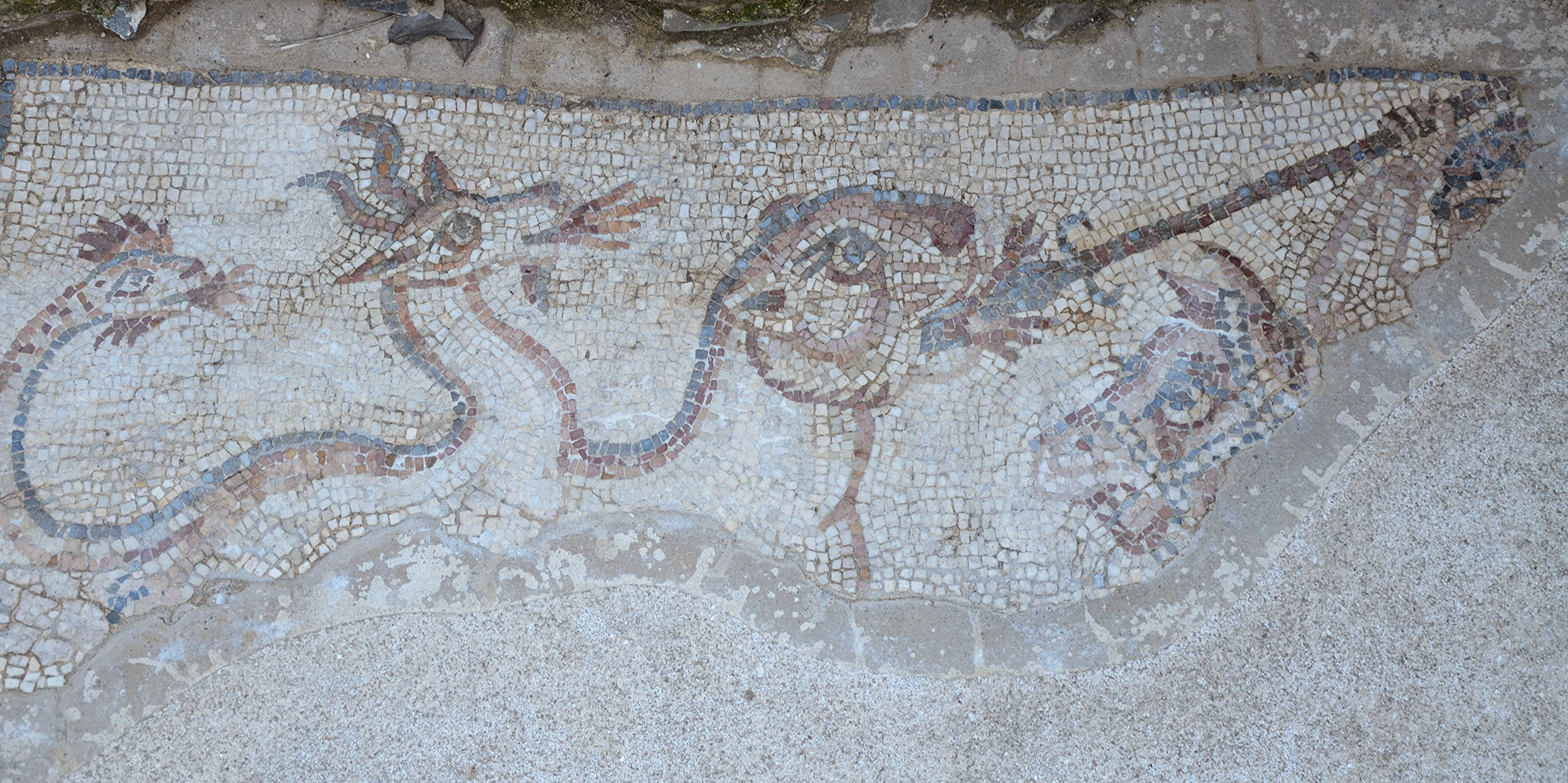
mosaic panel with Bellerophon riding Pegasus and spearing Chimera.
