= Martim Longo =

- Civil parish
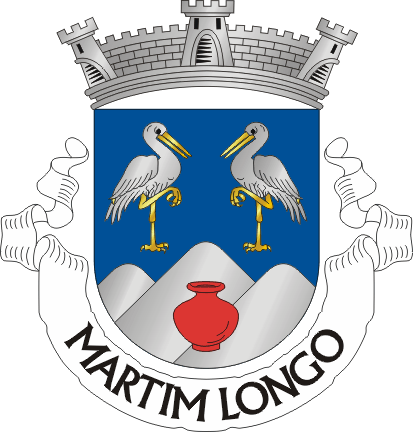
- Coat of arms

- Location in Portugal
- Coordinates: 37.439°N 7.766°W
- Country: Portugal
- Region: Algarve
- Intermunic. comm.: Algarve
- District: Faro
- Municipality: Alcoutim

Area
  - Total: 128.45 km^{2} (49.59 sq mi)

Population (2011)
  - Total: 1,030
  - Density: 8.02/km^{2} (20.8/sq mi)
- Time zone: UTC+00:00 (WET)
  - Summer (DST): UTC+01:00 (WEST)
- Postal code: 8970

Martim Longo is a Portuguese freguesia ("civil parish") in the municipality (concelho) of Alcoutim, on the eastern side of the Algarve. The population in 2011 was 1,030, in an area of 128.45 km^{2}.

== Heritage Sites ==
- Cerro do Castelo de Santa Justa Bronze Era settlement
- Igreja de Martim Longo
