= Castle of Alcoutim =

Medieval castle in Alcoutim, Algarve, Portugal

- Castelo de Alcoutim
- Faro, Algarve, Algarve in Portugal
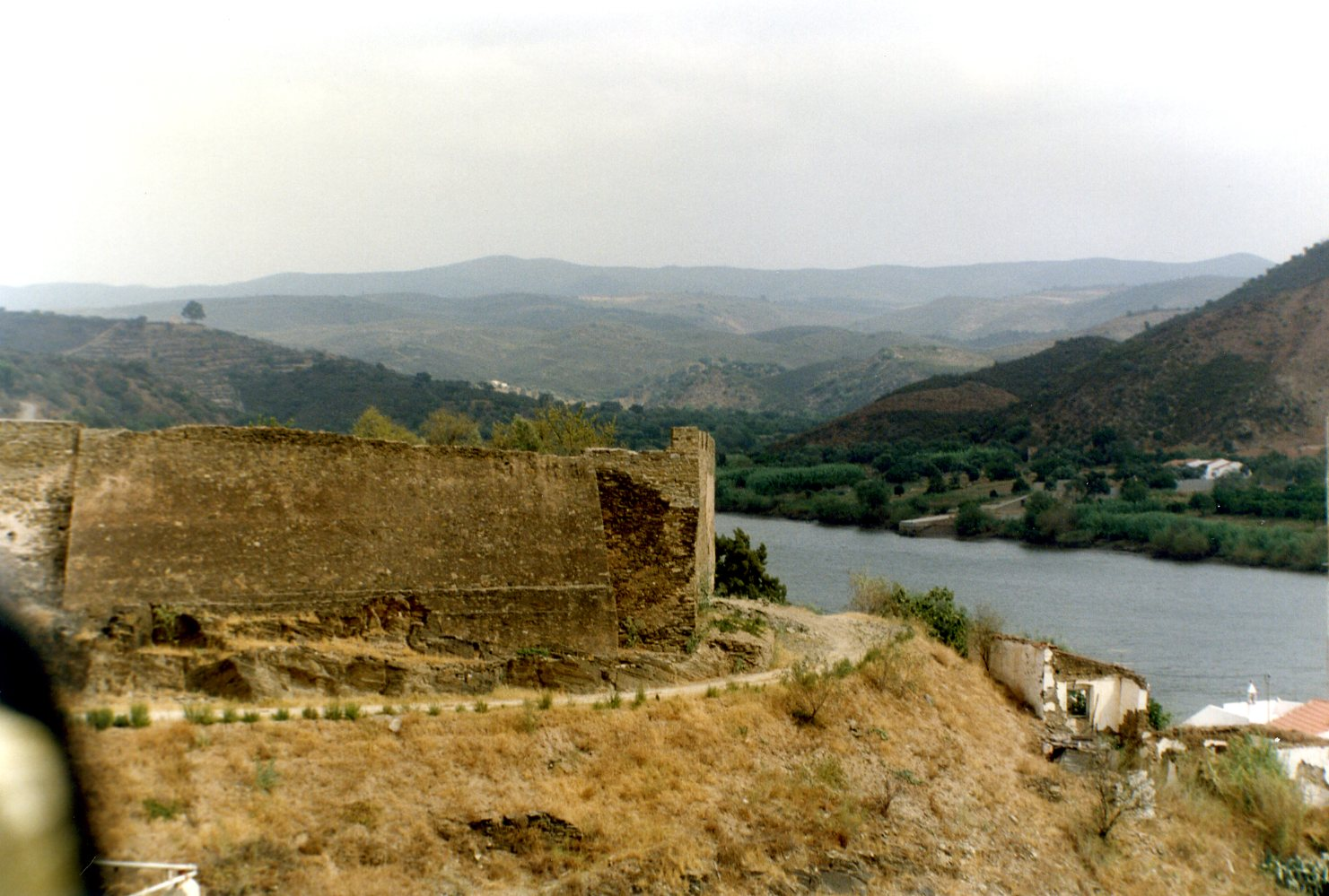
- An image of the Castle of Alcoutim, overlooking the Guadiana River

Site information
- Type: Castle
- Owner: Portuguese Republic
- Operator: Câmara Municipal de Alcoutim (transferred on 26 September 1941)
- Open to the public: Public

Location
- Coordinates: 37°28′14.17″N 7°28′18.81″W

Site history
- Built: Neolithic

The Castle of Alcoutim (Portuguese: Castelo de Alcoutim) is a medieval castle in the civil parish of Alcoutim, in the municipality of the same name, in the southeastern Algarve of Portugal. Built in the 13th century, the castle stands in a dominant position on a hill south of the parish seat of Alcoutim on the right bank of the San Marcos River (tributary of the Guadiana River), opposite the territory of Sanlúcar de Guadiana (in Spain).

== History ==
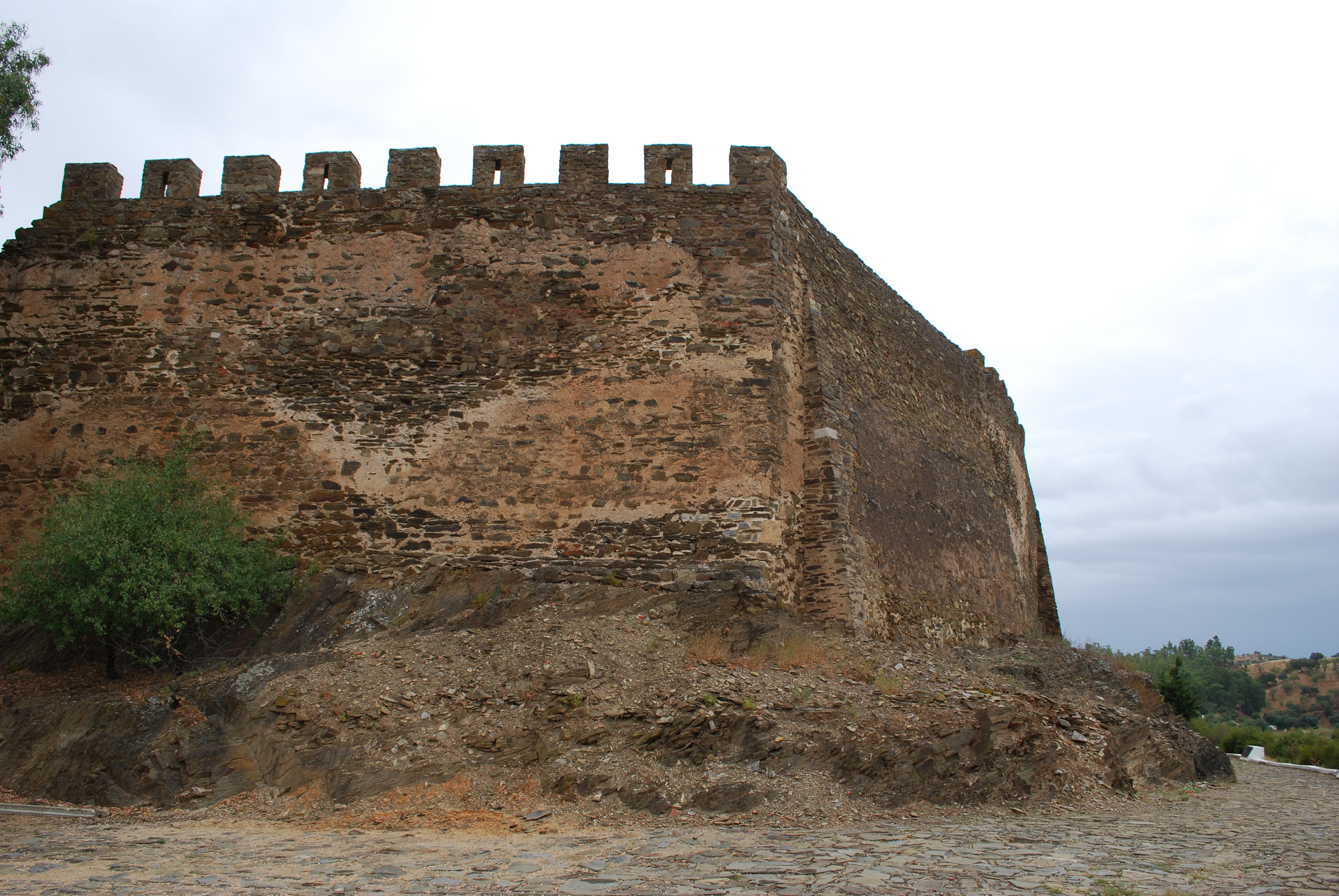
The medieval walls of the fortress dating back to the early Neolithic Lusitanian castro

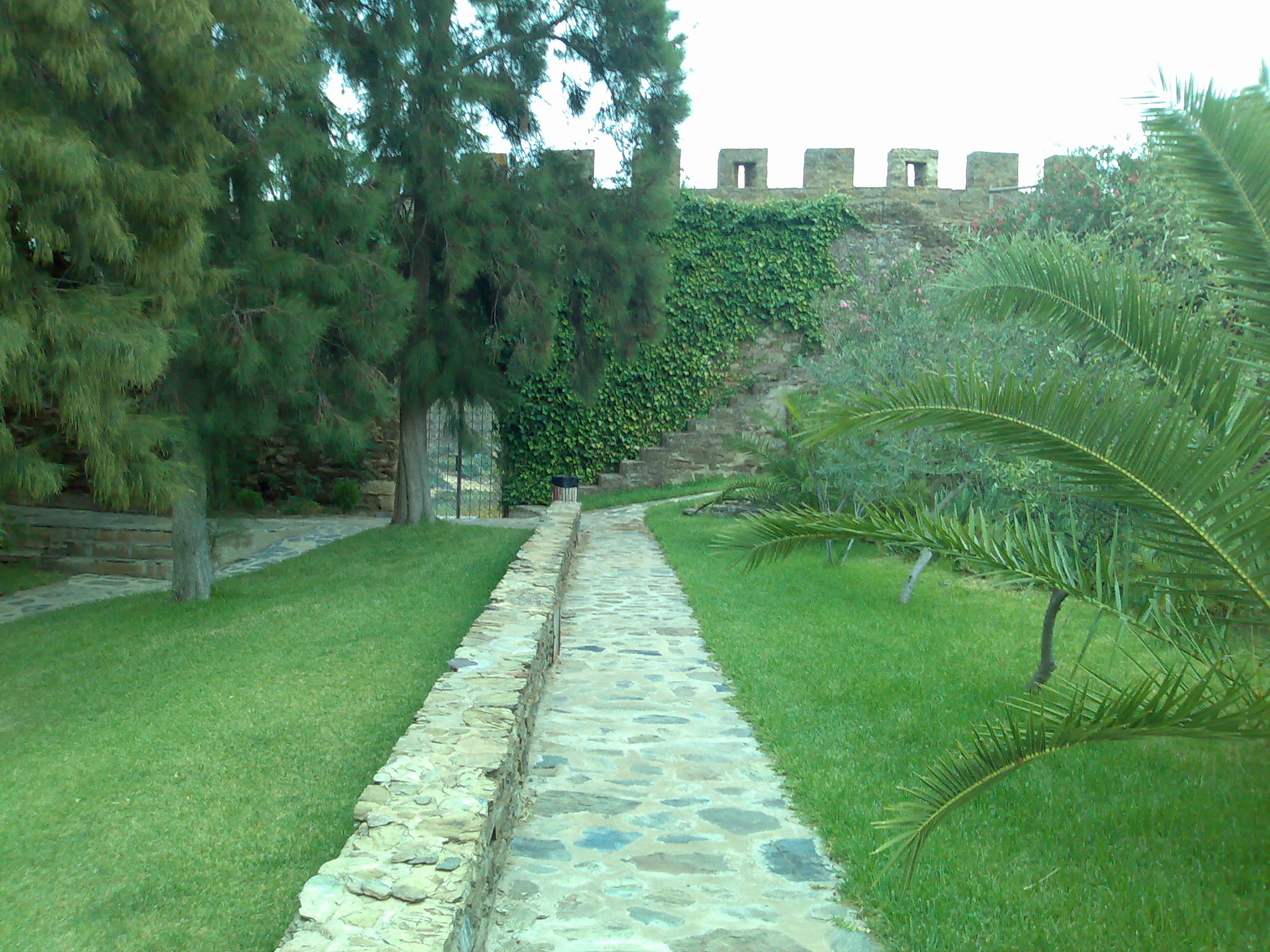
The interior courtyard of the castle/fortress

Various vestiges encountered in the immediate surroundings suggest that a Lusitanian castro may have existed on the site, during the transition from the Neolithic to Chalcolithic periods.

The Phoenicians came to this region at the end of the 10th century B.C.E., establishing a trading post under the protection of the Lusitanian castro. The Greeks, in the middle of the 8th century, also founded a colony that quickly dissolved into the Lusitanian population, along with the Celts and Carthaginians.

At the beginning of the 2nd century A.D., the Romans conquered Alcoutim at a time when the settlement was a rich centre, dominated by its busy port. The fortress at its centre was transformed into a military base for the occupying forces and political centre, which became known as Alcoutinium. Taken by the Alans in 415, the main square of Alcoutinium slowly fell into ruin, owing to the decrease in mineral exports. The Moors arrived in 715, changing the name to Alcatâ, yet could not restore the historical political and economic importance to the region.

It was only during the period of the Reconquista that the Castle began to gain a specific form. Integrated into the Portuguese Crown after 1240, the monarchs took various steps to increase settlement and establish an authority within the region. They did this by reconstructing and reformulating the defences during the second half of the 13th century. In 1240, Alcoutim was taken by the forces loyal to King Sancho II of Portugal, who ordered the reconstruction of the castle and wall to defend the population. At the same time, Sancho elevated the settlement to the status of town. King Denis of Portugal restored the castle and walls during his reign, at the same time (1304) conceding a foral (charter) to the settlement, transferring its title to the Order of São Tiago. Unfortunately, little remains of the primitive medieval castle. In fact, there are no monographs that depict the transition between the Moorish settlement and early Portuguese settlements What did remain were the two ogive gates, which hinted as to its Gothic military structure.

It was in this fortress that King Ferdinand of Portugal and Henry II of Castile signed a peace treaty; the defensive construction on the Guadiana River would continue to be an important buttress to Spanish authority in the region. King John II of Portugal and, later, King Manuel of Portugal would continue to repair and maintain the fortress. During the reign of Manuel of Portugal the Castle was constructed and elements of its Gothic architecture were replaced by rational fortifications and proto-modernist characteristics. In the book "Livrod das Fortelezas"Duarte d'Armas (around 1509) described the fortress as a rectangular plan that included no towers and accessible from one of the façades. Its walls were uniformly divided in two, and the exterior, there existed a few buildings supporting the structure.

During the Portuguese Restoration War, in 1640, new restoration and maintenance continued on the fortress, including the batteries of Cortadoiro and Santa Bárbara (which were designed to batter the Spanish border region). To this end, a landing was built towards the border and the fortress actively played a part in the context of the war.

But, this was the last phase of the fortifications importance: the fortress began a steady decline in military and political influence in the following decades. The Castle was eventually abandoned and began serving in various civic purposes (including slaughterhouse around 1878).

The General-Directorate for Buildings and National Monuments (Portuguese: DGEMN - Direcção Geral dos Edifícios e Monumentos Nacionais) first began focused maintenance in 1961, with restoration work on the masonry, which had become loose (and again in 1967), and re-construction and consolidation of parts of the walls. In 1969, many of the houses in states of ruin were demolished to unobstructed segments of the main walls. In 1977, the DGMEN continued to restore segments of the castle, including the merlons, repairing cracks in the wall, using reinforced concrete and installing a new main gate. But, in 1979, a new phase of construction resulted in the demolition of the masonry and roof of the main magazine. Three years later (1981), restoration works included: construction of the hydraulic lift in order to recuperate an access staircase to the battlements and reconstruction of the batteries and bulwarks.

Following public works to maintain the walls in 1985, the building received electrical illumination in the exterior in 1988. After 1992, the municipal council established a plan to develop the grounds for tourism and construct an archaeological museum for the municipality (under the architect Fernando Varanda).

In 2000 a museum in the center of the castle was officially opened to the public. It was most recently renovated in 2011 and covers the archaeological heritage of the castle and the region around it from the Neolithic to the Modern Period. In a building separate to the main museum is a permanent exhibition covering Islamic board games from the Moorish period. The castle and museum are open everyday of the year except 1 January plus 24, 25 and 31 December.

== Architecture ==
The structure is based on the intersection of two architectural styles, that includes both a medieval castle and medieval fort. Both are based in an irregular plan and consist of a structure identifiable by merlons (the medieval) and composed of artillery batteries and bulwarks guarding the river (the modern elements).

It is situated in an urban environment, on a hilltop overlooking the Ribeira de São Marcos, alongside the confluence of the Guadiana River (that borders the Spanish frontier town of São Lucar). A castle that protected its medieval town, the walls of the fortress circles the settlement of Alcoutim.
