= Mértola =

- Municipality
- Town of Mértola
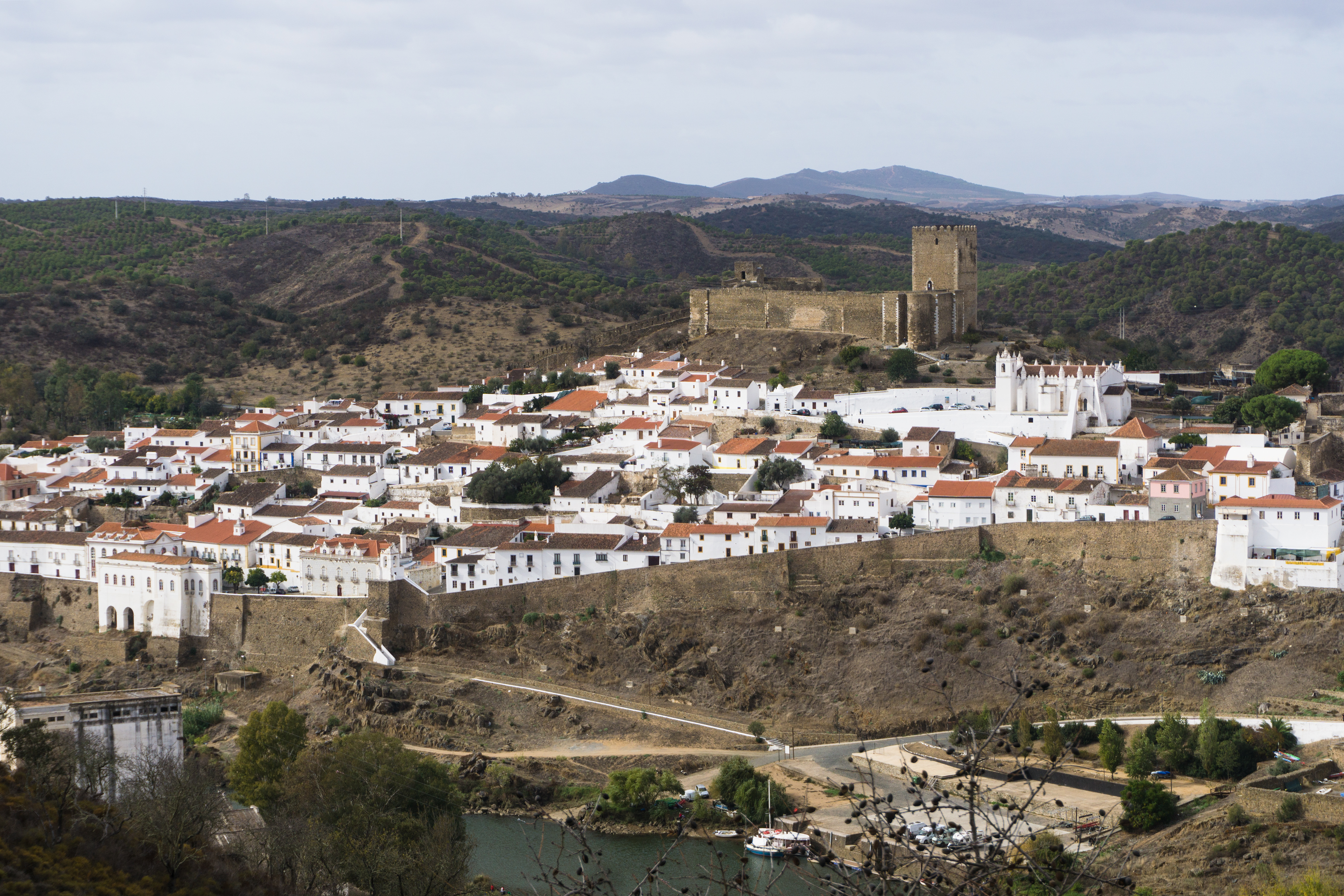
- Mértola viewed from the opposite shore of the Guadiana, with the city wall and the medieval castle uphill

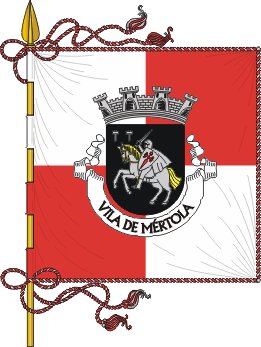
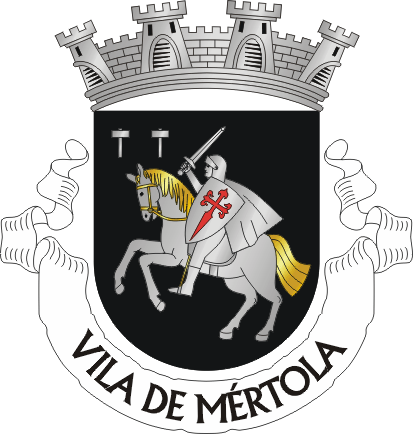
- Flag Coat of arms
- Interactive map of Mértola
- Coordinates: 37°38′25″N 7°39′40″W
- Country: Portugal
- Region: Alentejo
- Intermunic. comm.: Baixo Alentejo
- District: Beja
- Parishes: 7

Government
  - President: Jorge Rosa (PS)

Area
  - Total: 1,292.87 km^{2} (499.18 sq mi)

Population (2011)
  - Total: 7,274
  - Density: 5.626/km^{2} (14.57/sq mi)
- Time zone: UTC+00:00 (WET)
  - Summer (DST): UTC+01:00 (WEST)
- Local holiday: Saint John; June 24
- Website: Official website

Mértola (Portuguese pronunciation: [ˈmɛɾtulɐ]), officially the Town of Mértola (Portuguese: Vila de Mértola), is a town and municipality in southeastern Portuguese Alentejo near the Spanish border. In 2021, the population of the municipality was 6,206, in an area of approximately 1,292.87 square kilometres (499.18 mi^{2}): it is the sixth-largest municipality in Portugal. Meanwhile, it is the second-lowest population centre by density with approximately 5.62 persons/1 square kilometre (0.39 mi^{2}) (second to the adjacent Alcoutim).

The seat of the municipality is the town of Mértola, which had around 2500 inhabitants at the time of the 2021 census, located on a hill over the Guadiana River. Its strategic location made it an important fluvial commercial port in Classical Antiquity, through the period of Umayyad conquest of Hispania: Mértola's main church (the Church of Nossa Senhora da Anunciação) is the only medieval mosque to have survived the period in Portugal.

In 2017 Mértola started the process to become a UNESCO World Heritage Site.

== History ==
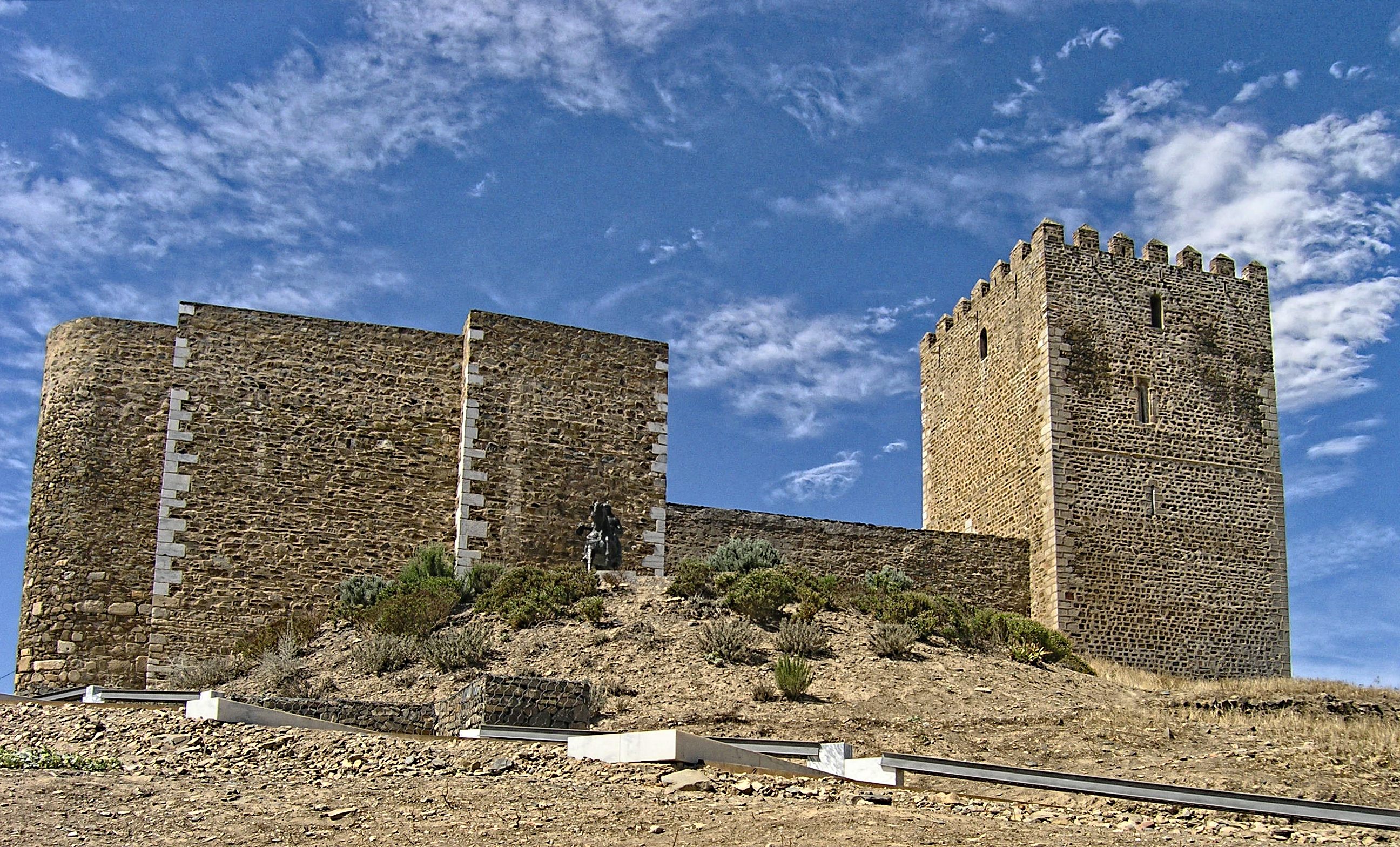
Mértola castle, Mértola, Portugal

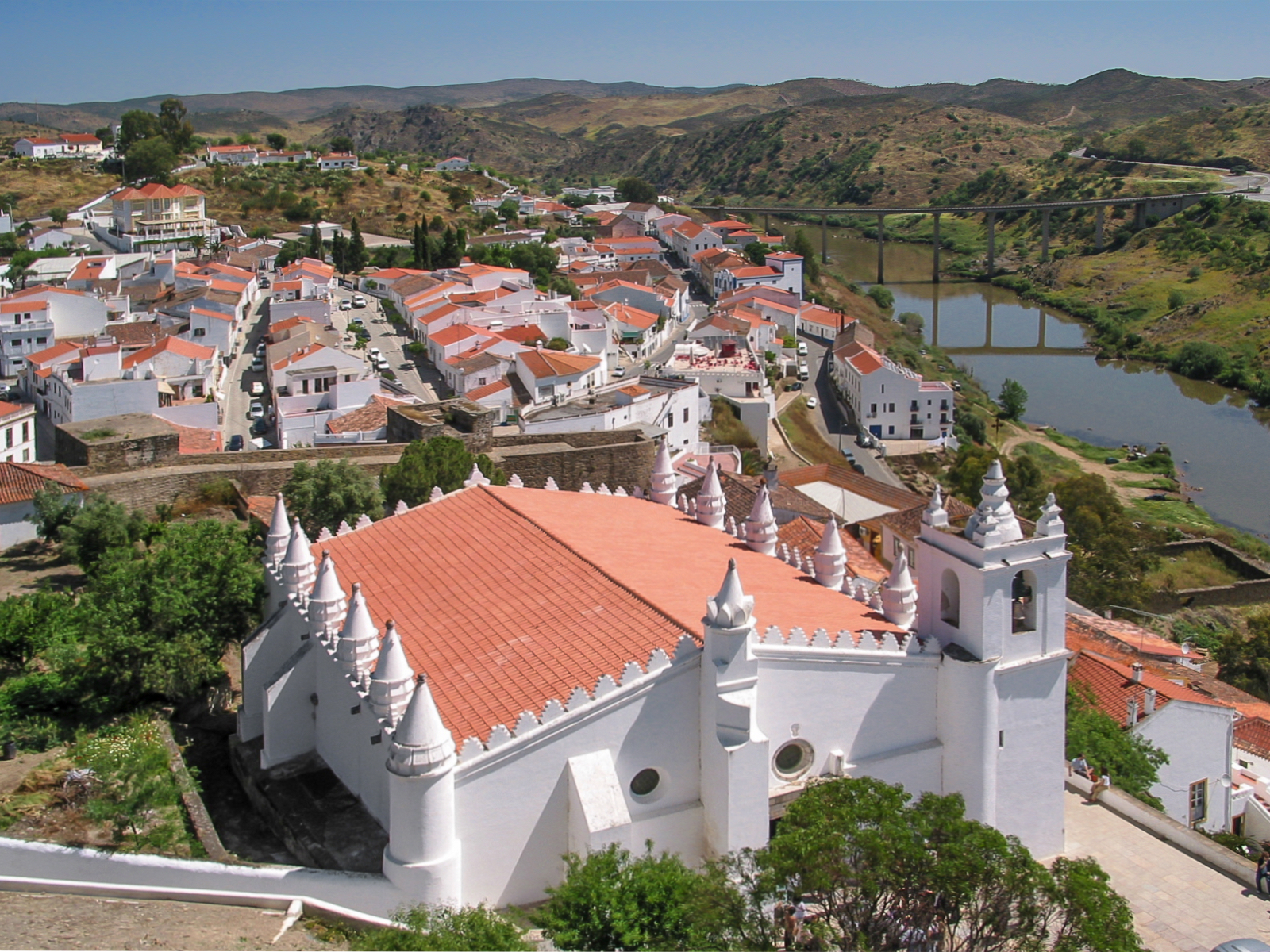
View of Mértola, over the Guadiana River. The main church (igreja matriz), originally a mosque, is in the foreground.

=== Romans ===
Mértola was inhabited at least since the Iron Age at least by Conni and Cynetes settlements. The original pre-Roman or Lusitanian name was Myrtilis or Mirtilus (referring to Iberian mint) a Hellenized adaptation subsequently renamed to Myrtilis Iulia by the Romans.

The strategic location of Mértola, on a hill by the northernmost navigable part of the Guadiana river, was crucial in its early development. Agricultural products grown in the villae nearby and valuable minerals (silver, gold and tin) obtained from the lower Alentejo region were sent from the fluvial port of Mértola via the Guadiana to Southern Hispania and the Mediterranean.

Between 1st and 2nd century, Myrtilis, part of the larger Pacensis region (under the capital Beja/Pax Julia), acquired great importance as a dynamic commercial centre, permitting it to mint its own coin. The town was raised to the status of a Municipium in times of Emperor Augustus and was connected to important Roman cities (Beja, Évora) through a road system.

=== Germanic tribes ===
During the Migration Period, Mértola was invaded by Germanic tribes of the Sueves and the Visigoths. In this period (5th-8th centuries) commerce was reduced but still active, as evidenced by Greek tombstones from the 6th-7th centuries found in Mértola which suggest trading, and the presence of Byzantine merchants in the town.

=== Moors ===
Around the year 711, Hispania was invaded by the Moors from the Maghreb, inaugurating a period of great influence of Islamic culture in the Alentejo region that would last over 400 years. Mértola and its port played an important economic role in the commerce of agricultural and mineral goods between the Alentejo and other parts of Al-Andalus and Northern Africa.

Mértola had a wall dating from Roman times, but the Muslims built new fortifications and, eventually, a castle to protect it from rival Muslim and Christian states. After the fall of the Caliphate of Córdoba, in 1031, Mértola became an independent taifa state, until it was conquered by the taifa of Seville in 1044-1045. Between 1144 and 1150 the town was again seat of an independent state led by Ibn Qasi, a mystic and skilled military leader who unified Southern Portugal and fought the power of the Almoravides. The independence of the region, however, was soon ended by an invading Almohad army. The ancient mosque of Mértola is a unique architectural structure of the Islamic period in Portugal, dating back to the 12th century. It is the only building in the country which despite being restructured and changed into a church, was allowed to keep some of the original architectural features.

=== Reconquista ===
In 1238, in the context of the Reconquista, the town was conquered by Portuguese King Sancho II, putting an end to several centuries of Islamic rule in the Mértola region. The town was donated to the Knights of the Order of St. James, a Military Order that played a vital role in the Christian conquest of Southern Portugal. The seat of the Order was established in Mértola until 1316. Most of the castle, including its mighty keep, and a letter of feudal rights (foral), granted in 1254, are from the Reconquista period. The economic importance of Mértola and the Guadiana faded after that period.

In the 15th-16th centuries, when the Portuguese conquered several cities in the Maghreb, Mértola experienced a brief revival in its economic relevance, supplying Portuguese troops in Northern Africa with cereals. King Manuel I granted a new foral to the town in 1512.

=== Modernity ===
After a long period of economic stagnation, the discovery of copper in the São Domingos Mine around 1850 led to a new wave of development that would end abruptly in 1965, when the mine was exhausted. In the next decades, the municipality lost much of its population, who emigrated to richer parts of Portugal and other European countries. Starting in the 1980s, a series of archaeological surveys brought to light various remnants of past periods of Mértola, and the town became an important cultural touristic site.

== Geography ==
Population of Mértola (1849 - 2004)
Year	Pop.	±%
1801	9,617	—
1849	10,757	+11.9%
1900	18,910	+75.8%
1930	26,310	+39.1%
1960	26,026	−1.1%
1981	11,693	−55.1%
1991	9,805	−16.1%
2001	8,712	−11.1%
2004	7,996	−8.2%
2011	7,274	−9.0%

Administratively, the municipality is divided into 7 civil parishes (freguesias):

- Alcaria Ruiva
- Corte do Pinto
- Espírito Santo
- Mértola
- Santana de Cambas
- São João dos Caldeireiros
- São Miguel do Pinheiro, São Pedro de Solis e São Sebastião dos Carros

=== Climate ===
Mértola has a Mediterranean climate (Köppen: Csa) with hot to very hot dry summers and mild wet winters.

Climate data for Mértola (1991–2020), extremes (1981-present)
Month	Jan	Feb	Mar	Apr	May	Jun	Jul	Aug	Sep	Oct	Nov	Dec	Year
Record high °C (°F)	24.2 (75.6)	25.6 (78.1)	30.5 (86.9)	34.9 (94.8)	39.5 (103.1)	44.1 (111.4)	45.0 (113.0)	45.3 (113.5)	44.1 (111.4)	35.6 (96.1)	27.7 (81.9)	22.4 (72.3)	45.3 (113.5)
Mean daily maximum °C (°F)	14.5 (58.1)	15.9 (60.6)	19.0 (66.2)	21.1 (70.0)	25.4 (77.7)	30.5 (86.9)	34.0 (93.2)	33.8 (92.8)	29.5 (85.1)	24.2 (75.6)	18.3 (64.9)	15.2 (59.4)	23.5 (74.3)
Daily mean °C (°F)	9.6 (49.3)	10.6 (51.1)	13.2 (55.8)	15.1 (59.2)	18.5 (65.3)	22.6 (72.7)	25.2 (77.4)	25.3 (77.5)	22.4 (72.3)	18.5 (65.3)	13.4 (56.1)	10.6 (51.1)	17.1 (62.8)
Mean daily minimum °C (°F)	4.7 (40.5)	5.2 (41.4)	7.4 (45.3)	9.0 (48.2)	11.5 (52.7)	14.6 (58.3)	16.4 (61.5)	16.9 (62.4)	15.3 (59.5)	12.8 (55.0)	8.5 (47.3)	6.0 (42.8)	10.7 (51.3)
Record low °C (°F)	−4.5 (23.9)	−4.2 (24.4)	−2.9 (26.8)	0.5 (32.9)	3.7 (38.7)	7.1 (44.8)	9.7 (49.5)	10.2 (50.4)	7.6 (45.7)	3.9 (39.0)	−1.1 (30.0)	−3.4 (25.9)	−4.5 (23.9)
Average precipitation mm (inches)	48.3 (1.90)	40.7 (1.60)	49.6 (1.95)	48.8 (1.92)	39.3 (1.55)	9.8 (0.39)	1.0 (0.04)	3.7 (0.15)	23.4 (0.92)	63.1 (2.48)	56.7 (2.23)	63.1 (2.48)	447.4 (17.61)
Average precipitation days (≥ 1 mm)	7.1	5.7	6.9	6.9	5.7	1.3	0.2	0.6	3.1	7.1	7.0	7.3	59.1
Source: Instituto Português do Mar e da Atmosfera

== Culture ==
=== Main sights ===
- The castle of Mértola, located on the highest point of the town. The current building dates from a reconstruction carried out by the knights of the Order of Saint James of the Sword after the town was taken by the Christians. The most notable feature of the castle is its 30-metre-high keep tower, finished around 1292, which has an inner hall covered with Gothic vaulting. The defences include a city wall, which still encircles the town.
- Main church (the Matriz), was originally a mosque built between the 12th and 13th centuries. After the Christian conquest of the town in 1238, the mosque was turned into a church, but its architectural structure was preserved. In the 16th century, the church was partially remodelled, gaining Manueline vaulting with a new roof and a new main portal in Renaissance style. Nevertheless, the inner arrangement of the naves of the church, with four naves and several columns, still resembles that of the original mosque, and in the church interior, even the [mihrab] niche decorations pointing to Mecca for prayers, was spared from destruction. Outside, the church has four portals with horseshoe arches, typical of Islamic architecture. This is the only structure of the Islamic period left mostly unaltered in Portugal.
- The museum of Mértola, consisting mostly of archaeological findings and excavations, has collections distributed all over the town. The nucleus of Islamic art in the museum is the most important in Portugal. It consists of various objects (pottery, glassware, metalwork, coins) dating from that period. The collection is housed in the old cellars of the noblemen of the House of Braganza. Other exhibits include remnants of an ancient Christian church, of the basilica type, with an active cult lasting from the 5th to the 8th century. It has a large collection of palaeochristian tombstones with inscriptions, and excavations of a Roman house found under the Municipality building.

=== Festivals ===
- Festival Islâmico de Mértola - Celebrating the Islamic cultural connection between Islam and Mértola. Occurs every two years.

== Notable people ==
- Juan Díaz de Solís (1470–1516) a 16th-century navigator and explorer, said to be the first European to land on Uruguay.
- António Raposo Tavares (1598–1658) a colonial bandeirante who explored mainland eastern South America
- José Sebastião e Silva (1914–1972) a mathematician, worked on analytic functionals and the theory of distributions
- Fernando Venâncio (1944-2025) a writer, intellectual, literary critic, linguist and academic.
