= Giões =

- Civil parish
- Location in Portugal
- Coordinates: 37.472°N 7.696°W
- Country: Portugal
- Region: Algarve
- Intermunic. comm.: Algarve
- District: Faro
- Municipality: Alcoutim

Area
  - Total: 71.80 km^{2} (27.72 sq mi)

Population (2011)
  - Total: 256
  - Density: 3.57/km^{2} (9.23/sq mi)
- Time zone: UTC+00:00 (WET)
  - Summer (DST): UTC+01:00 (WEST)

Giões (European Portuguese pronunciation: [ʒiˈõjʃ]) is a freguesia (parish) in the municipality of Alcoutim (Algarve, Portugal). The population in 2011 was 256, in an area of 71.80 km^{2}.

== Main sites ==
- Relíquias Castle
- Nossa Senhora da Oliveira Church
