= Vaqueiros (Alcoutim) =

- Civil parish
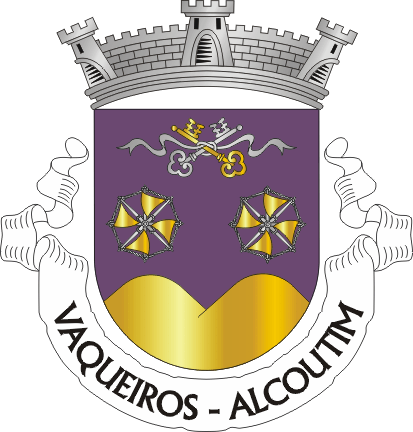
- Coat of arms

- Location in Portugal
- Coordinates: 37.384°N 7.728°W
- Country: Portugal
- Region: Algarve
- Intermunic. comm.: Algarve
- District: Faro
- Municipality: Alcoutim

Area
  - Total: 143.94 km^{2} (55.58 sq mi)

Population (2011)
  - Total: 497
  - Density: 3.45/km^{2} (8.94/sq mi)
- Time zone: UTC+00:00 (WET)
  - Summer (DST): UTC+01:00 (WEST)

Vaqueiros is a freguesia (parish) in the municipality of Alcoutim (Algarve, Portugal). The population in 2011 was 497, in an area of 143.94 km^{2}.
