= Alcoutim e Pereiro =

- Civil parish
- Location in Portugal
- Coordinates: 37.471°N 7.472°W
- Country: Portugal
- Region: Algarve
- Intermunic. comm.: Algarve
- District: Faro
- Municipality: Alcoutim

Area
  - Total: 231.17 km^{2} (89.26 sq mi)

Population (2011)
  - Total: 1,134
  - Density: 4.905/km^{2} (12.71/sq mi)
- Time zone: UTC+00:00 (WET)
  - Summer (DST): UTC+01:00 (WEST)

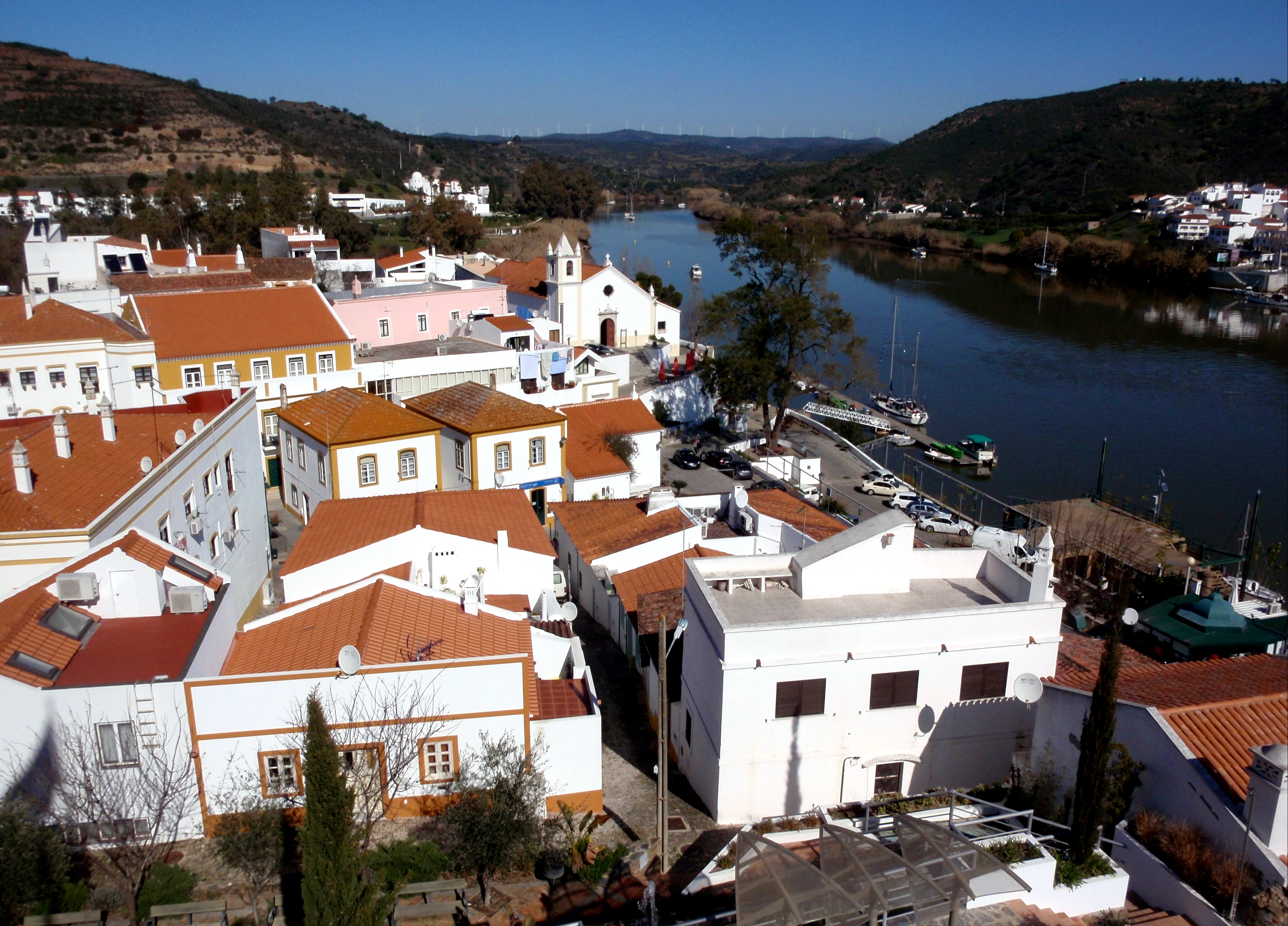

Alcoutim e Pereiro is a civil parish in the municipality of Alcoutim, Algarve, Portugal. It was formed in 2013 by the merger of the former parishes Alcoutim and Pereiro. The population in 2011 was 1,134, in an area of 231.17 km^{2} (89.26 sq mi).

== See also ==
- Menhirs of Lavajo
