= Sanlúcar de Guadiana =

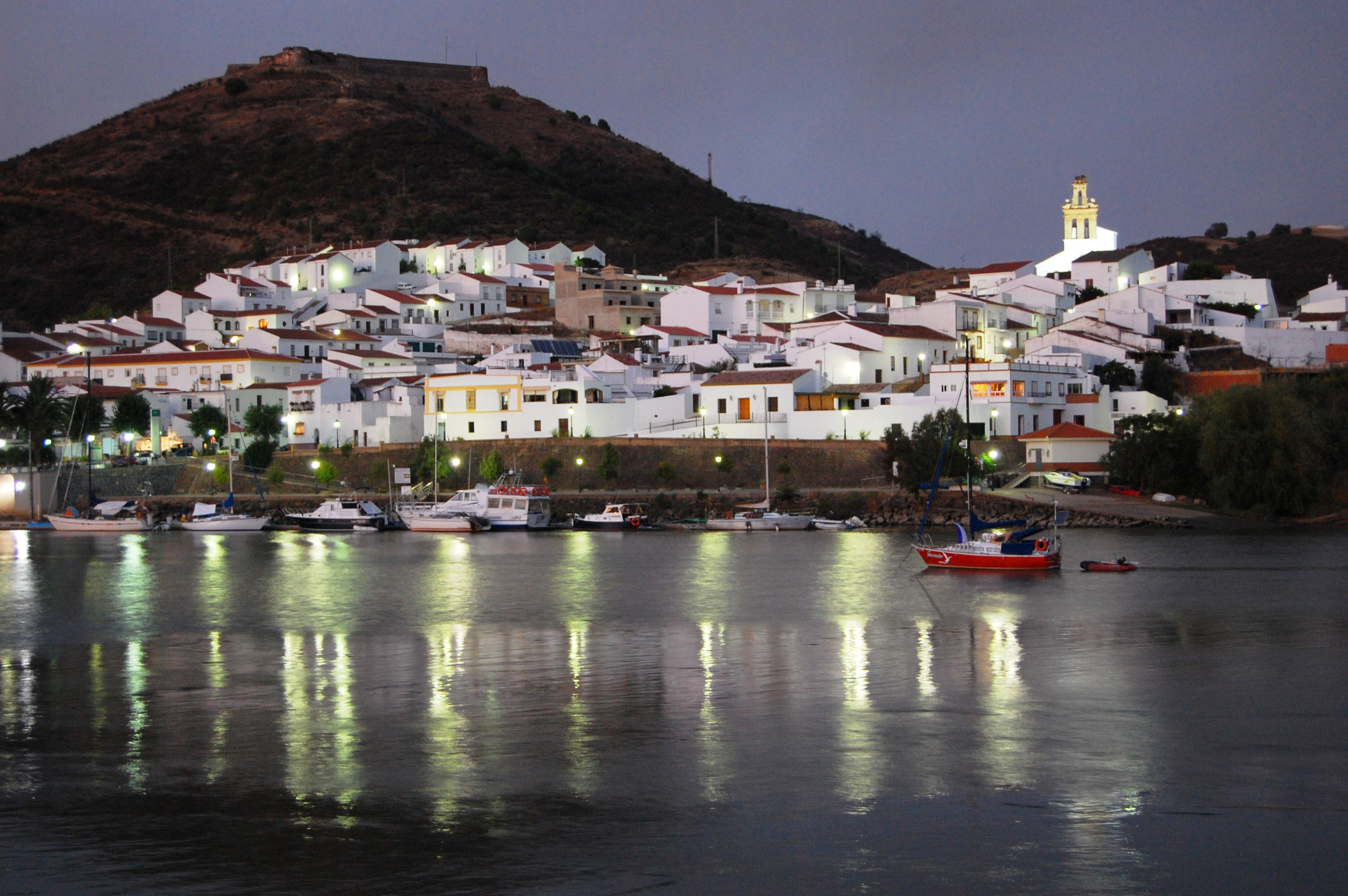
- Sanlúcar seen from Alcoutim

- Flag Coat of arms

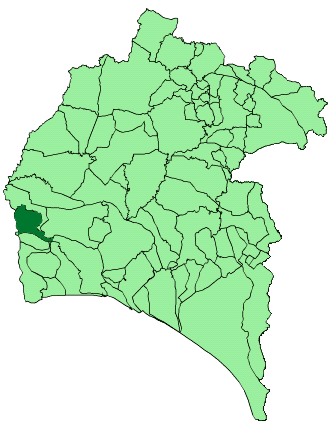
- Coordinates: 37.47255°N 7.46655°W
- Country: Spain
- Autonomous community: Andalusia
- Province: Huelva
- Municipality: Sanlúcar de Guadiana

Area
  - Total: 49 km^{2} (19 sq mi)

Population (2025-01-01)
  - Total: 418
  - Density: 8.5/km^{2} (22/sq mi)
- Time zone: UTC+1 (CET)
  - Summer (DST): UTC+2 (CEST)

Sanlúcar de Guadiana is a localidad in the province of Huelva, Andalusia, Spain, situated near the Portugal–Spain border, 50 kilometres (31 mi) from the city of Huelva. The inhabitants are known as Sanluqueños. The village borders the Guadiana River, which is tidal at this point, but the higher parts of the village rise to an altitude of 149 metres (489 ft).

The restored San Marcos castle overlooks the village.

The village faces Alcoutim across the river. A ferry for foot passengers is available but to get from Sanlúcar to Alcoutim by road involves a trip of about 70 kilometres (43 mi).

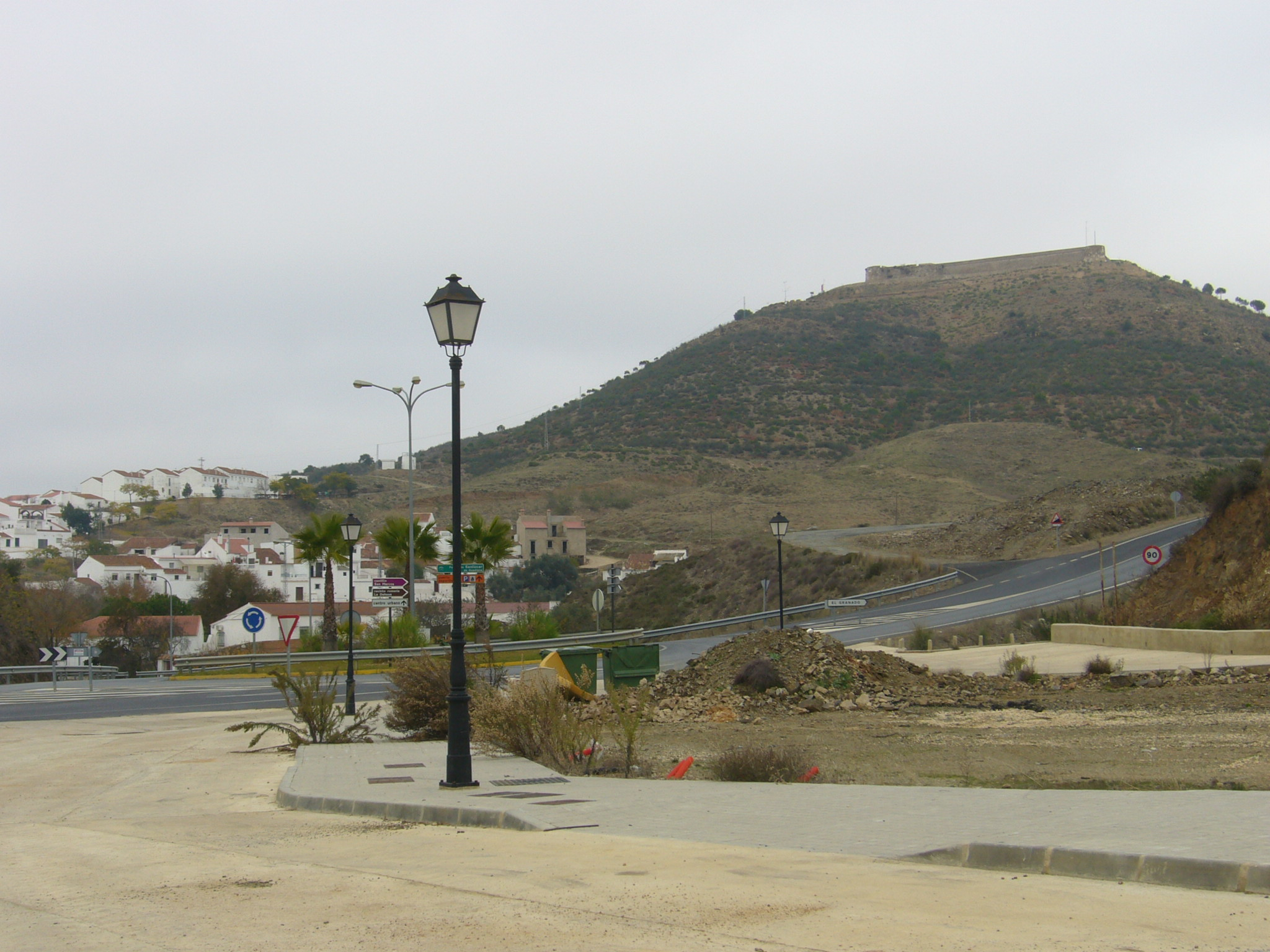
The upper part of the village

== See also ==
- List of municipalities in Huelva
