= Alcoutim =

- Municipality
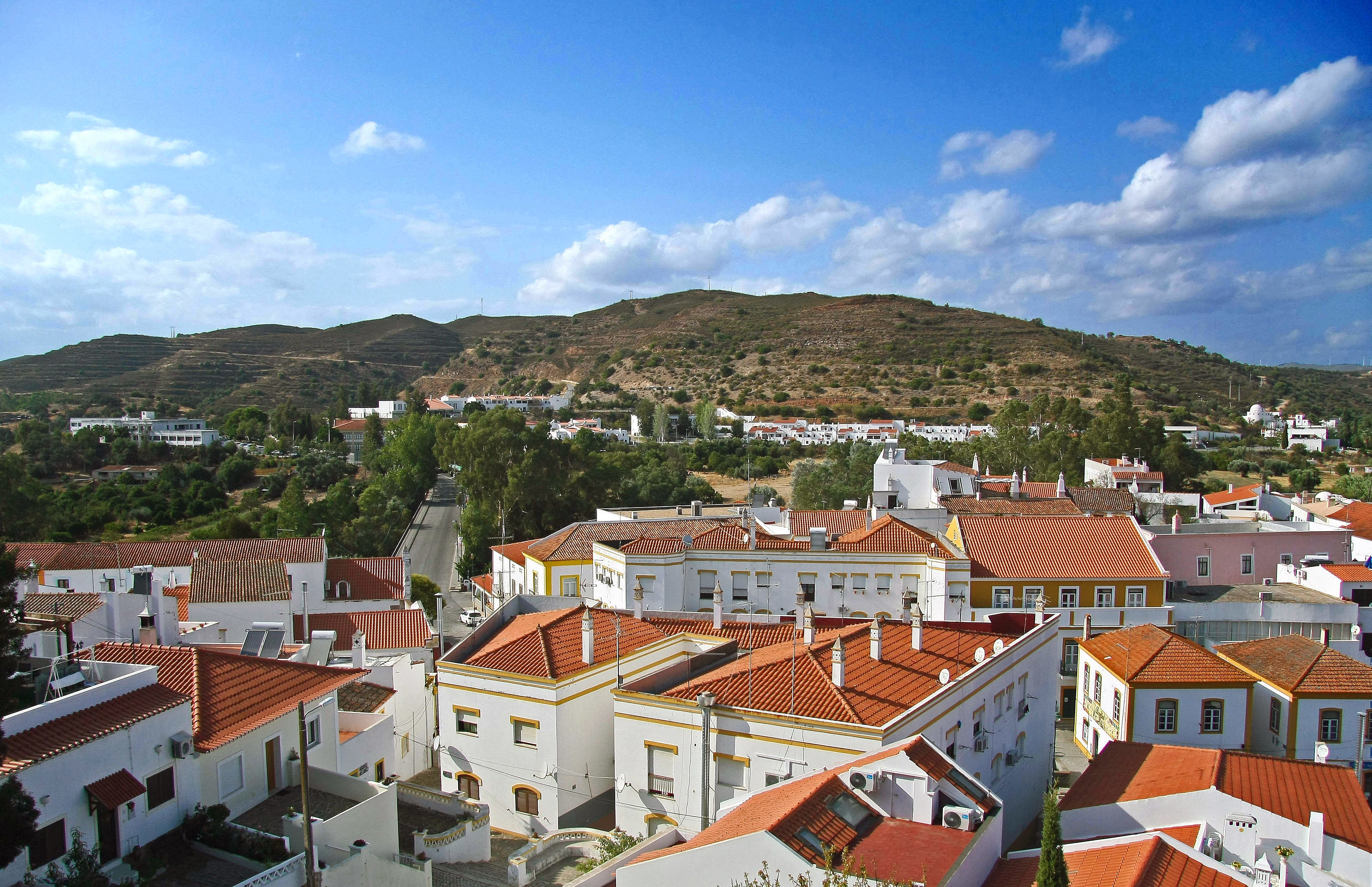
- View of Alcoutim

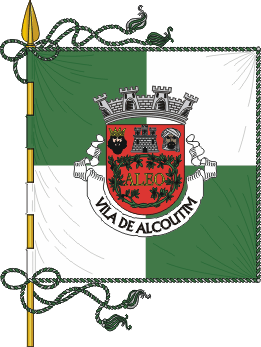
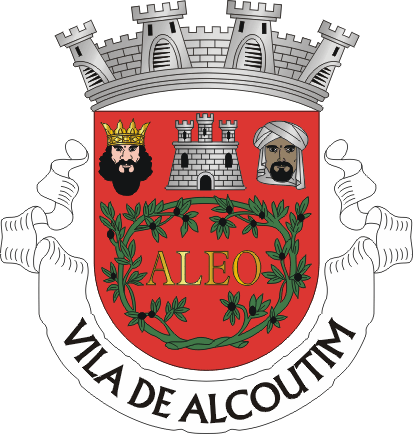
- Flag Coat of arms
- Interactive map of Alcoutim
- Location in Portugal
- Coordinates: 37°28′N 7°28′W
- Country: Portugal
- Region: Algarve
- Intermunic. comm.: Algarve
- District: Faro
- Parishes: 4

Government
  - President: Osvaldo Gonçalves (PS)

Area
  - Total: 575.36 km^{2} (222.15 sq mi)

Population (2011)
  - Total: 2,917
  - Density: 5.070/km^{2} (13.13/sq mi)
- Time zone: UTC+00:00 (WET)
  - Summer (DST): UTC+01:00 (WEST)
- Local holiday: Second Friday of September
- Website: http://www.cm-alcoutim.pt

Alcoutim (locally [alkoˈtĩ]) is a town and a municipality in southeastern Portugal near the Portugal–Spain border. The population in 2011 was 2,917, in an area of 575.36 km². It is the least densely populated municipality in Portugal. The municipality is limited on the north by Mértola Municipality, on the east by Huelva Province in Spain, on the southeast by Castro Marim Municipality, on the southwest by Tavira Municipality and on the west by Loulé Municipality and Almodôvar Municipality. The administrative center is the town of Alcoutim, located at the extreme eastern part of the municipality on the Spanish frontier, just across the Guadiana River from the Spanish town of Sanlúcar de Guadiana in Huelva Province. The Moorish Alcoutim Castle, located in the municipality, dates from the 14th century.

== Coat of arms ==
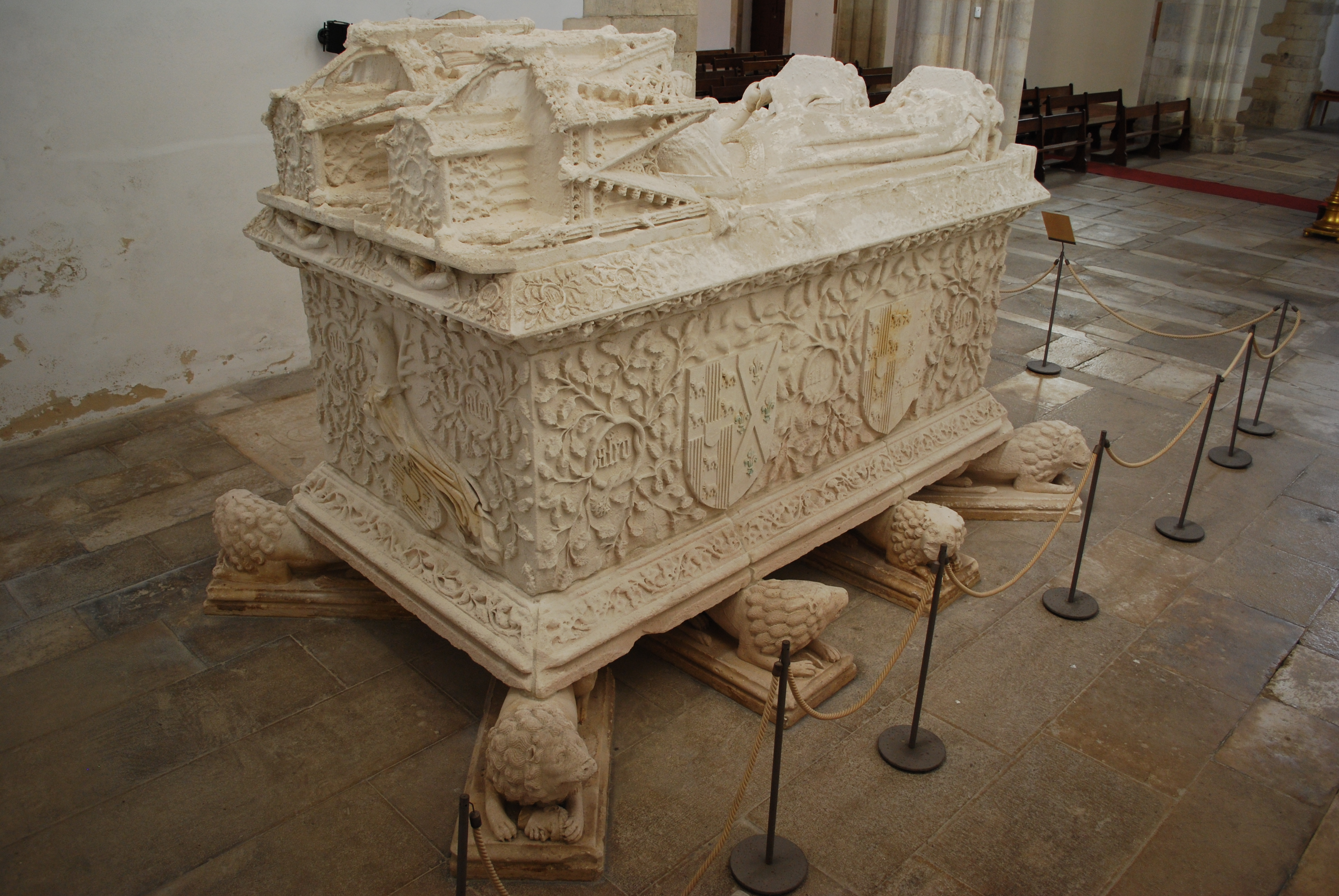
Tomb of Pedro de Menezes, in the Igreja da Graça in Santarém.

The coat of arms of Alcoutim - a wreath of zambujeiro (wild olive tree) and the slogan Aleo - is derived from the decorative motif of the tomb of Pedro de Menezes, 1st Count of Vila Real, found in the Igreja da Graça in Santarém. 'Aleu' or 'aleo' is an old Portuguese term for a 'gaming stick' (as used in hockey or shuffleboard). It refers to a famous episode concerning Pedro de Menezes from shortly after the Conquest of Ceuta on September 2, 1415 (commemorated on Ceuta Day). Pedro de Menezes was engaged in an outdoor game in the king's presence when a messenger arrived reporting an imminent Moroccan attack on Portuguese-held Ceuta. Menezes is said to have raised his gaming stick (aleo) and told the king that "with that stick alone" he could defend Ceuta from all the power of Morocco. Pedro's descendants were later made Counts of Alcoutim. Similar design can be seen on the coat of arms of Vila Real.

== Parishes ==
Administratively, the municipality is divided into 4 civil parishes (freguesias):

- Alcoutim e Pereiro
- Giões
- Martim Longo
- Vaqueiros

== Climate ==
Alcoutim has a Mediterranean climate (Köppen climate classification Csa) with very hot and dry summers and mild winters. Due to its location in the Guadiana River basin it has a climate that very much resembles that of relatively nearby Seville and Cordoba. With an average July high of around 35 to 36 °C (95 to 97 °F) it is one of the hottest places in Portugal and Europe during the summer months.

Climate data for Alcoutim, 1985-2021, altitude: 32 m (105 ft)
Month	Jan	Feb	Mar	Apr	May	Jun	Jul	Aug	Sep	Oct	Nov	Dec	Year
Average precipitation mm (inches)	57.4 (2.26)	41.8 (1.65)	36.5 (1.44)	52.0 (2.05)	36.5 (1.44)	11.3 (0.44)	0.9 (0.04)	4.0 (0.16)	23.5 (0.93)	68.9 (2.71)	68.9 (2.71)	90.9 (3.58)	492.6 (19.41)
Source: Portuguese Environment Agency
