= Topography of Spain =

Relief map of peninsular Spain and the Balearic Islands.

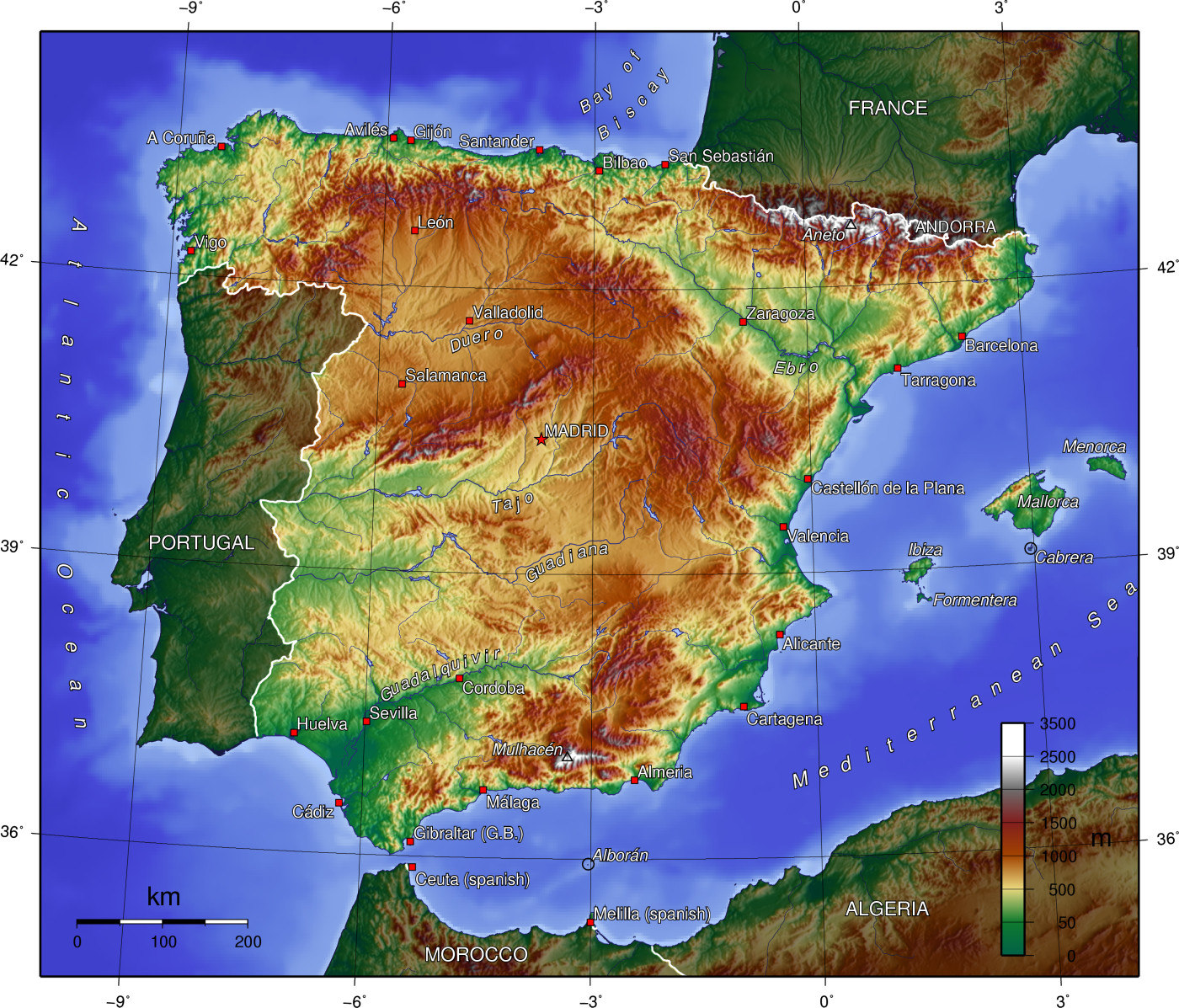
Map of Spain showing terrain altitude and topography.

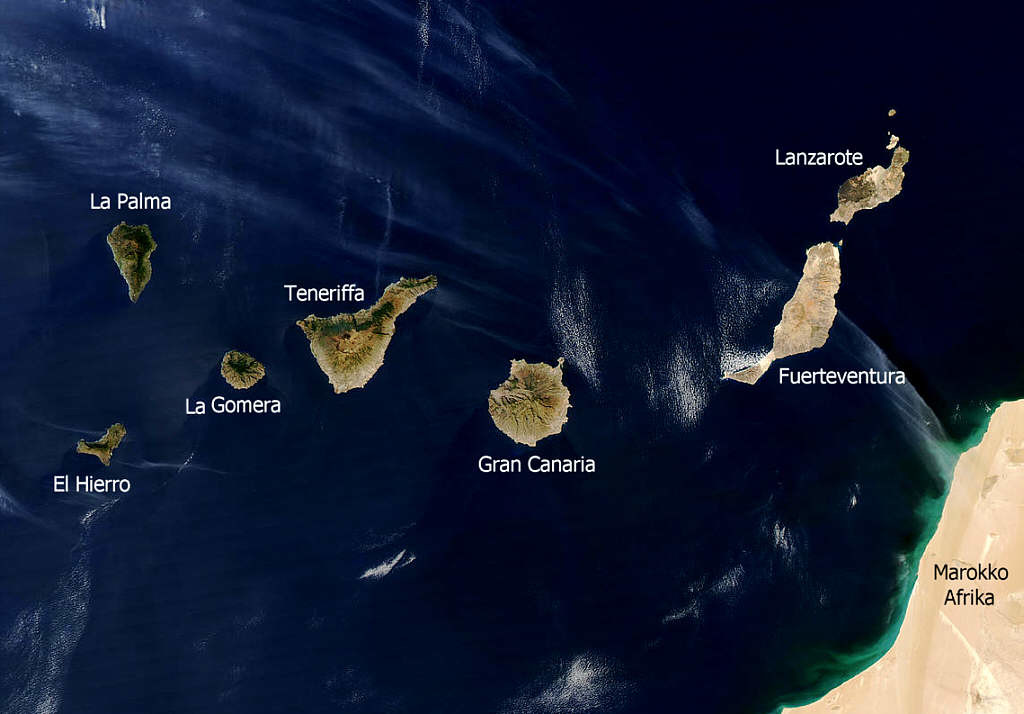
The Canary Islands, located in North Africa, are of volcanic origin.

Hypsometric curve of peninsular Spain. In spite of being bathed by the Mediterranean Sea and the Atlantic Ocean, half of its surface is at 660 m or more above sea level.

The topographical relief of Spain is characterized by being quite high, with an average altitude of 660 meters above sea level, quite mountainous compared to other European countries and only surpassed by Switzerland, Austria, Albania, Montenegro, North Macedonia and the microstates of Andorra and Liechtenstein. In peninsular Spain, the terrain is articulated around a large Meseta Central (central plateau) that occupies most of the center of the Iberian Peninsula. Outside the plateau, there is the depression of the Guadalquivir river, located in the southwest of the peninsula, and the Ebro river depression, located in the northeast.

The mountain systems of Spain are very numerous and occupy almost half of the national territory. The Pyrenees (in the northeastern limit) and the Baetic System (in the southeast) are the highest mountain ranges, located outside the Meseta Central. Surrounding this is the Cantabrian Range in the north, the Iberian System in the east, and the Sierra Morena in the south. Within the Meseta Central is the Sistema Central and Montes de Toledo.

Two archipelagos of geographic interest belong to Spain: the Balearic Islands, located in the Mediterranean Sea, with a latitude similar to that of Castilla-La Mancha; and the Canary Islands, seven islands of volcanic origin located in the Atlantic Ocean, close to the coast of Western Sahara; and of less importance: the island of Alborán between Spain and Morocco and the Columbretes Islands in Castellón. Also from Spain are some small coastal enclaves in North Africa: the cities of Ceuta and Melilla, the Chafarinas Islands, the Peñon de Alhucemas and the Peñon de Velez de la Gomera.

The Spanish coast, bathed by the Atlantic Ocean and the Cantabrian and Mediterranean Seas, has a great diversity of beaches, cliffs and rias. The high (presence of cliffs and wave-cut platform) and articulated coast (presence of rias and capes) is the most predominant in the north and the Canary Islands, while the low coast (presence of beaches and coves) is typical of the south, the Mediterranean and the Balearic Islands.

== Geological evolution of the Iberian Peninsula ==
Spain has a great variety of landscapes, with the existence of large mountains and depressions, the mountains can be steep or smooth. The terrain is also influenced by the massive and not very articulated shape of the peninsula, the coasts lack projections and have a high average altitude. There is a mountainous belt that surrounds the peninsula and makes access to the interior difficult.

=== Lithology ===
- Siliceous Spain: these are the oldest materials. There are three types of rocks: granite (plutonic), slate (easily eroded) and quartzite (metamorphic), much harder and more resistant than slate, of which there is a variant called Armorican quartzite.
- Limestone Spain: these are more recent materials than the siliceous ones. It is formed by carbonates and is made up of large sedimentary packages from the Mesozoic Era that were folded at the beginning of the Cenozoic Era. They are composed of calcium carbonate and are characterized by their high solubility. The type of landscape is karstic, very influenced by water erosion in this type of lithology. We find different morphologies: dolines, karstic hills belonging to the alpine regions, etc.
- Clayey Spain: these are the newest materials (Cenozoic era and Quaternary period). They are sedimentary and have not been folded. The predominant material is clay to which other materials are added.

=== Geological structure ===
From the beginning of the Paleozoic Era there was a continent that geologists have called Gondwana, with contours different from those of today's African continent, but from which this continent actually derives. To the north, at the same time, the continent that we can call Paleo-Europe, from which today's Europe would later derive, extended at the same time. And between both continents there was a sea much wider and deeper than the present Mediterranean, the ologistsas' cient Tethys.

At the end of the Paleozoic Era, tectonic and orogenic movements took place, known as the Hercynian orogeny (or Hercynian folding), of great intensity. After them, the western territories of the Peninsula acquired a physiognomy similar to the present one. To the north, east and south, the Tethys sea extended. The topographical relief thus formed took the Armorican direction (name of the ancient French Brittany) from NW-SE.

Hercynian folding affected large masses of sediments that were transformed into slates, quartzites and granitic formations. All this magmatic activity also gave rise to veins of minerals such as lead, mercury, pyrite, etc., which are the main basis of the peninsula's mineral wealth. This movement affected all of Europe and gave rise, among others, to the Massif Central and the Black Forest.

In this surface (western territories of the Peninsula), known as Paleozoic basement, silica is currently predominant, the most common expression of which is quartz. The overall area forms what is known as siliceous Spain.

The Mesozoic Era was of orogenic calmness, characterized by the erosion of what already existed, and sedimentation of materials in the different marine trenches.

The alpine folding stage occurs in the Cenozoic era, with strong pressures that fold the materials; the barriers that had been created in the Hercynian orogeny will have a capping effect on these forces. These pressures will fold the more modern materials, which are of a soft nature, and the older materials will break. With these strong pressures, the Pyrenees were formed, the Meseta was fractured and gave rise to the Sierra Morena, the Cantabrian Range and the Iberian System, after several million years the Baetic Systems were formed and the Balearic Islands emerged. Alpine foredeep were also formed, which are depressions that precede the mountain ranges and will be filled with materials.

At the end of the Cenozoic era, the current peninsula will be almost completed. In the post-Alpine period there will be deformations that will give rise to groupings, a consequence of the Alpine orogeny. The continental masses try to reach an equilibrium and release the accumulated tensions. These subsequent and associated processes are called morphological tectonics and are vertical movements.

From the Neogene period there have been three posthumous movements: the first one is the bulging of the plateau that tilts westward, derived from this, there are a series of thrusts from the east that cause the basement to also tilts towards the Atlantic, and the third phase is a series of movements of vertical origin that raise the alpine mountain ranges (Sistema Central and Montes de Toledo).

In the Quaternary period there are changes in the landscape, which are eustatic movements that affect the sea level. There are both rises and falls, with glacialism origin. Volcanic phenomena also appear in fragmented areas or faults such as Olot and La Mancha. In addition, rivers take the current configuration and begin their erosion.

Finally, there are the morphogenetic systems that give rise to the current relief, referring to the climatic, erosive, chemical and mechanical aspects that affect the terrain and are linked to tectonics. Glaciations also had an influence (in the highest parts), together with water and wind.

One form is the glacial cirque, a kind of circular depression under the influence of ice that occurs at higher altitudes and gives rise to a series of ice tongues called moraines that emerge from the highest part of the mountain and run through the valley to the base; if it fits between mountains and carves a valley in the shape of a "U" it is called a trough. This is very common in the Pyrenees and higher areas.

Another type of modeling occurs in the lower elevations, the periglacial domain, which is very common in interglacial periods. The most important forms of modeling are hydrofracturing and solifluction, which in turn alter the processes of fluvial erosion: in the coldest phases the rivers will have less flow than in the thaw when they increase their erosive force and form the cliffs.

== Peninsular relief ==
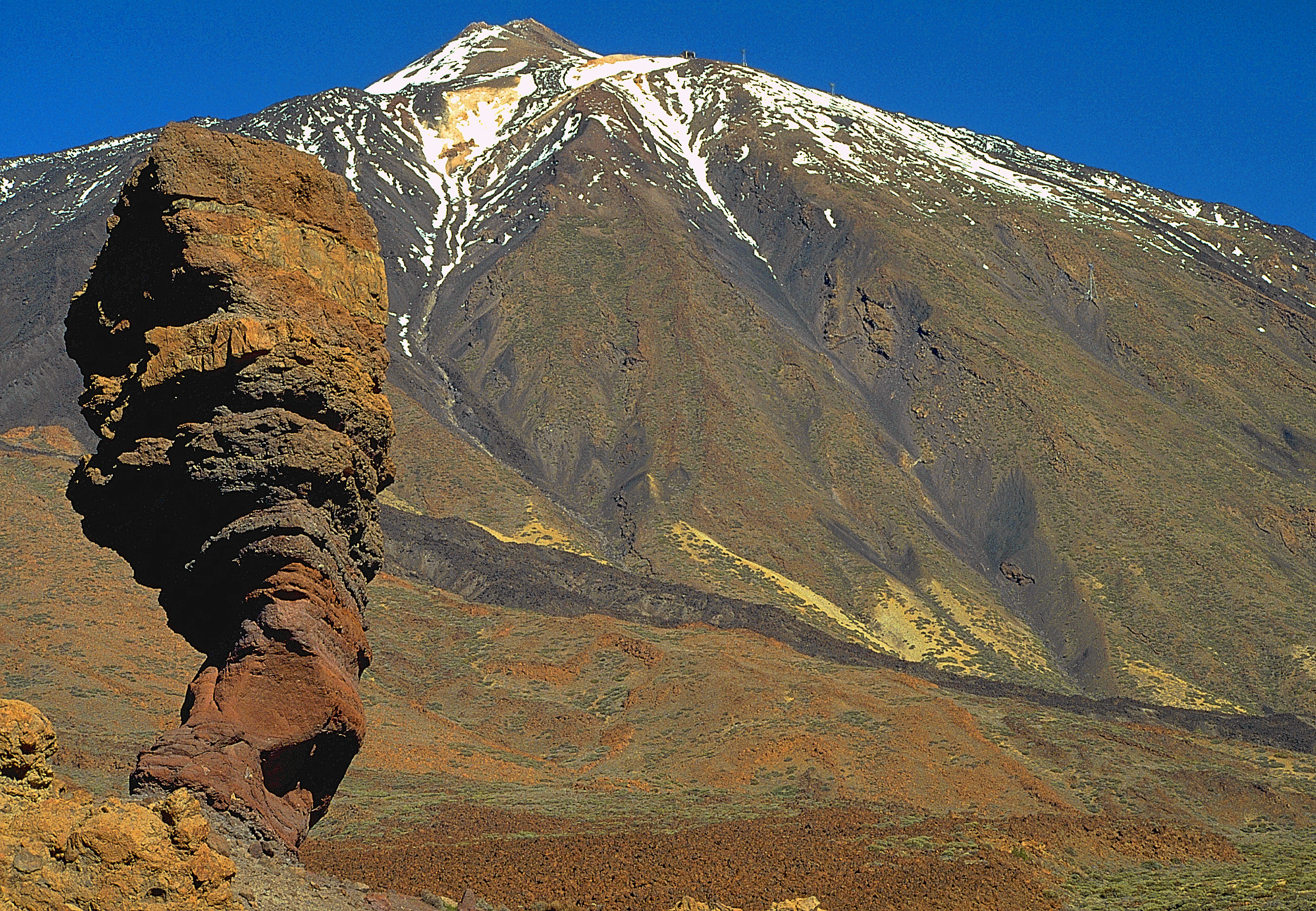
Main peaks and mountains of Spain
	Name	Mountain range	Altitude (m.a.s.l.)
01	Pico Teide	Tenerife Island	3,715
02	Pico Mulhacén	Sierra Nevada	3,478
03	Pico Aneto	Pyrenees	3,404
04	Pico del Veleta	Sierra Nevada	3,392
05	Pico Posets	Pyrenees	3,375
06	Pico Alcazaba	Sierra Nevada	3,366
07	Monte Perdido	Pyrenees	3,355
08	Pico Maldito	Pyrenees	3,350
09	Pico Marboré	Pyrenees	3,328
10	Pico de la Maladeta	Pyrenees	3,309
Source: General Directorate of the National Geographic Institute (Spain)

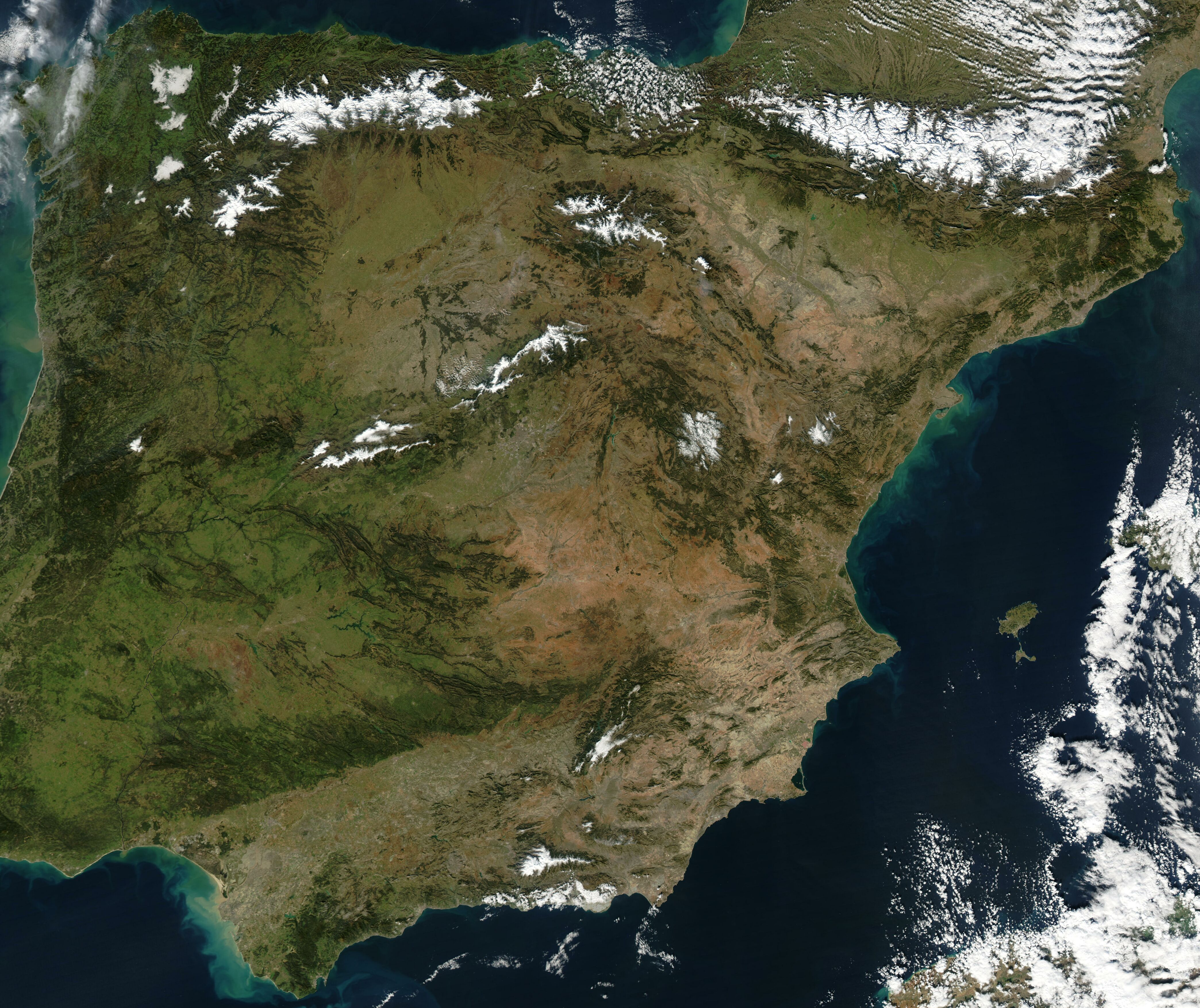
Peninsular Spain and the Pityusic Islands as seen from satellite. The snow-covered areas are the highest areas of the peninsula.

Peninsular Spain has a surface area of 493,458 km^{2} (97.53% of the national territory) and its coastline measures a total of approximately 4600 km. The average altitude is 660 meters above sea level, and the maximum width of the peninsula is 1094 km. The terrain is characterized by the abundance of mountain systems, since almost half of the surface is rugged. The Meseta Central is the main element of the terrain because it is located in the center of the country, occupies a large area and around it the mountain ranges and depressions are articulated.

The highest mountain ranges are the Baetic System, the Pyrenees, the Cantabrian Range and the Sistema Central. The Iberian System, the Catalan Mediterranean System, the Montes de Toledo and the Sierra Morena make up mid-mountain areas, the most abundant in rugged areas. The flat areas are made up of the Meseta Central, the Ebro and the Guadalquivir depressions, and the coastal plains of the Mediterranean coast. The seas that bathe the Spanish coast are the Mediterranean Sea to the northeast, east, southeast and south, with the Cantabrian Sea to the north and the Atlantic Ocean to the northwest and southwest.

The Spanish territory also presents a great natural and human diversity, which is given by the variety of the terrain and the climatic contrasts caused by it, which determine different types of vegetation, water and soil. This variety of the physical environment means an unequal distribution of natural resources in space and, consequently, of human economic activities, giving rise to a great plurality of human landscapes.

=== Meseta Central ===
The topographical relief of the Iberian Peninsula is articulated around a large central unit, the Meseta Central, with an average altitude of 650 meters above sea level. This is located in the center of the Iberian Peninsula, in the autonomous communities of Castilla y León, Madrid, Castilla-La Mancha, the eastern half of Extremadura and the southwest of Aragon, and is slightly inclined to the Atlantic Ocean. The main rivers flowing through the plateau are the Douro, the Tagus and the Guadiana, all of which flow westward. The Central system divides the Meseta Central into two submesetas: the Submeseta Norte (Northern Subplateau) and the Submeseta Sur (Southern Subplateau).

The Submeseta Norte is located exclusively in Castilla y León and has an average altitude of 700 meters above sea level. It borders in the south with the Sierra de Gata and Sierra de Gredos, and in the southeast with the Sierra de Guadarrama and Sierra de Ayllón, all of them belonging to the Sistema Central. In its east-northeast limit is the Iberian system, and in the north it limits with the Cantabrian Range. The whole submeseta belongs to the Douro river basin, which flows from east to west.

The Submeseta Sur is located in the autonomous communities of Madrid, Castilla-La Mancha, in the eastern half of Extremadura and in the Aragonese province of Teruel. It has an average altitude of 670 meters above sea level and is limited by successive mountain ranges. In the northwestern limit are the Sierra de Gredos and Sierra de Guadarrama, and in the north the Sierra de Ayllón, all of them belonging to the Sistema Central. In the northeastern and eastern limit is the Iberian system, and in the south extends the Sierra Morena. The Submeseta Sur is divided into two halves, north and south, by the Montes de Toledo, a small mountain range that runs from west to east and is located in the north of La Mancha. The Tagus River flows from east to west in the northern half of the submeseta, and the Guadiana River flows with the same orientation in the southern half. Both basins are separated by the Montes de Toledo.

=== Mountain ranges ===
The main mountain ranges of the peninsula can be considered, in relation to the Meseta Central, organized into three groups:

- Mountain ranges inside the Meseta Central.
- Mountain ranges surrounding the Meseta Central.
- Mountain ranges outside the Meseta Central.

==== Mountain ranges inside the Meseta Central ====
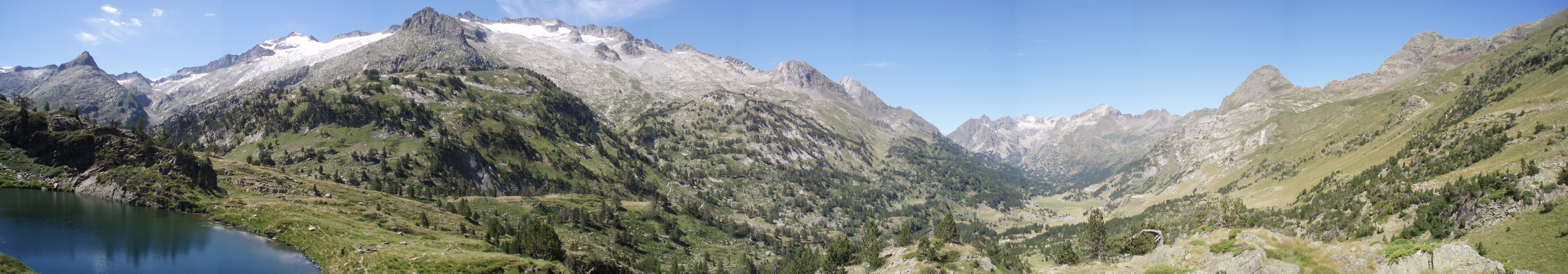
Main mountain ranges in Spain
System	Mountain range	Highest point	Altitude (m.a.s.l.)
Cantábrico	Picos de Europa	Torre de Cerredo	2,648
Cantábrico	Macizo Galaico-Leonés	Teleno	2,188
Cantábrico	Fuentes Carrionas	Peña Prieta	2,538
Cantábrico	Montes Vascos	Aitxuri	1,551
Pirenaico	Prepirineos	Cotiella	2,912
Pirenaico	Pirineos Navarros	Mesa de los Tres Reyes	2,428
Pirenaico	Pirineos Aragoneses	Pico Aneto	3,404
Pirenaico	Pirineos Catalanes	Pica d'Estats	3,143
Costero Catalán	Cordillera Litoral	Turó Gros	773
Costero Catalán	Cordillera Prelitoral	Montseny	1,712
Costero Catalán	Cordillera Transversal	Puigsacalm	1,515
Ibérico	Sierra del Moncayo	Moncayo	2,316
Ibérico	Sierra de la Demanda	Monte San Lorenzo	2,270
Ibérico	Picos de Urbión	Urbión	2,228
Ibérico	Sierra de Albarracín
Central	Sierra de Gredos	Pico Almanzor	2,592
Central	Sierra de Guadarrama	Peñalara	2,428
Central	Sierra de Ayllón	Pico del Lobo	2,272
Central	Sierra de Béjar	Canchal de la Ceja	2,425
Central	Sierra de Gata	Jálama	1,492
Montes de Toledo	Sierra de Guadalupe	Pico Villuercas	1,601
Sierra Morena	Sierra Madrona	Bañuelas	1,324
Sierra Morena	Sierra de Aracena
Sierra Morena	Sierra Hornachuelos
Subbético	Sierra de Cazorla	Empanadas	2,106
Subbético	Sierra Orce-María		2,045
Subbético	Sierra de Huétor	Peñón de la Cruz	2,027
Subbético	Sierra de Castril	Pico el Buitre	2,013
Subbético	Sierra de Segura	Las Banderillas	1,993
Subbético	Sierra Sur de Jaén	Pandera	1,872
Subbético	Sierra de Grazalema	Pico del Pinar	1,654
Subbético	Sierra Las Estancias
Prebético	Sierra de La Sagra	La Sagra	2,383
Penibético	Sierra Nevada	Mulhacén	3,480
Penibético	Sierra de Baza-Filabres	Santa Bárbara	2,269
Penibético	Sierra de Gádor	Launilla	2,249
Penibético	Sierra de las Nieves	Torrecilla	1,919
Penibético	Sierra Espuña	Morrón de Totana	1,585

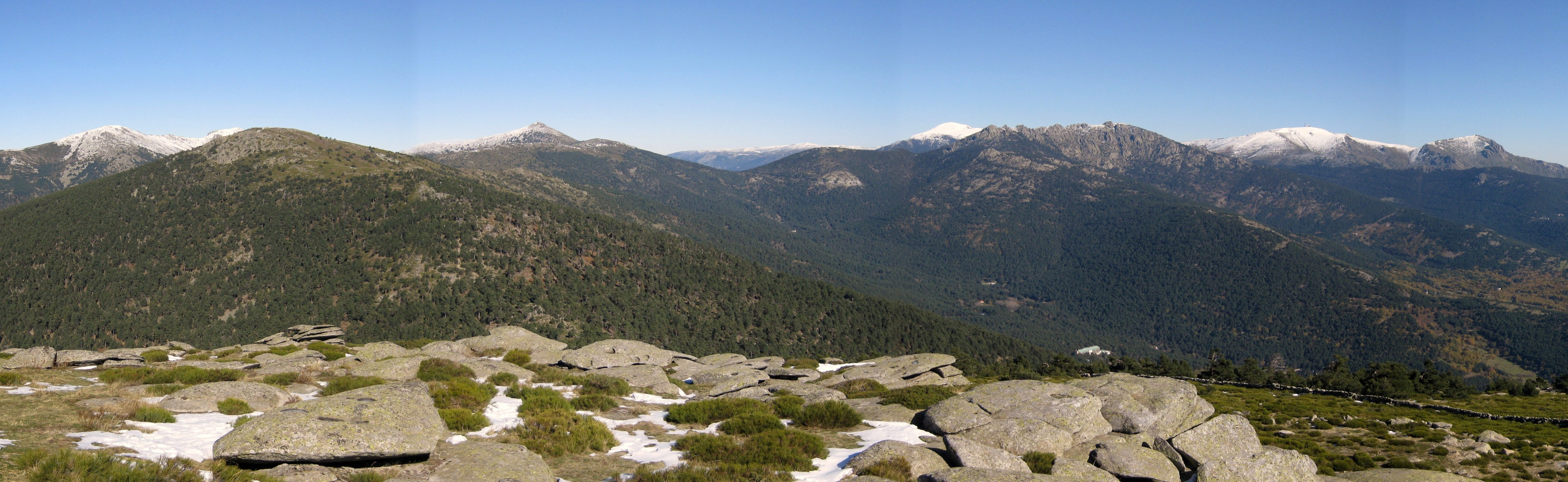
Sierra de Guadarrama, (Sistema Central).

Within the Meseta Central there are two mountain systems: the Sistema Central and the Montes de Toledo. The Sistema Central, located in the center of the plateau, divides it into two sub-plateaus(north and south) and is the natural border between the autonomous communities of Castilla y León on the one hand, and the Community of Madrid and Castilla-La Mancha on the other. The mountain range stretches from west to east for 700 km, and its highest peak is the Almanzor, with 2592 m asl. Some of its mountain chains are the Sierra de Gata and Sierra de Gredos in its western half, and the Sierra de Guadarrama and Sierra de Ayllón in its eastern half.

The other mountain system is the Montes de Toledo, a small mountain range 350 km long and 100 km wide that extends from west to east in the provinces of Toledo and Cáceres. These mountains are not particularly high, since the highest peak, the Villuerca Alta, measures 1603 m asl. To this mountain range belongs the Sierra de Guadalupe, located in the center of Extremadura.

The mountain ranges inside the Meseta Central are:

- Sistema Central
  - Sierra de Gata
  - Sierra de Béjar
  - Sierra de Gredos
  - Sierra de Guadarrama
  - Sierra de Ayllón
- Montes de Toledo
  - Sierra de Guadalupe

==== Mountain ranges surrounding the Meseta Central ====
Surrounding the Meseta Central is the Cantabrian Range, the Iberian System and the Sierra Morena. The Cantabrian Range extends from west to east for 480 km along the entire northern limit of the plateau, acting as a natural boundary between Castilla y León and the Cantabrian autonomous communities (Galicia, Asturias, Cantabria and the Basque Country). The highest altitude of the mountain range is the peak of Torre Cerredo with its 2648 m asl. Thus, the Cantabrian Range separates the plateau from the coast of the Cantabrian Sea.

In the northeast and east limit of the Meseta Central is the Iberian System, a mountainous system with southeast-northwest orientation and a length of about 600 km that acts as a natural boundary between the two Castillas and Aragon. It begins in La Rioja and ends in the province of Albacete. To the mountain range belong mountains like the Picos de Urbión in La Rioja and the province of Soria, the Sierra de Albarracín in the province of Guadalajara, the Serranía de Cuenca (in the province of Cuenca), and the Sierra del Rayo in the Aragonese province of Teruel. The highest peak is the Moncayo with its 2313 m a.s.l. Therefore, the Iberian system separates the plateau from the Ebro depression and the Levantine coast from the Mediterranean Sea.

At the southern limit of the Meseta Central is Sierra Morena, a mountain system that extends from west to east with a length of 400 km, making it the natural boundary of Castilla-La Mancha and Extremadura with Andalusia. Its maximum elevation slightly exceeds 1000 meters above sea level, so it is not a particularly high mountain range. Sierra Morena includes mountain chains such as the Sierra Madrona, the Sierra de Aracena and the Sierra de Hornachuelos. Thus, Sierra Morena separates the plateau from the Guadalquivir depression.

In the northwest, next to Galicia, are the Montes de León.

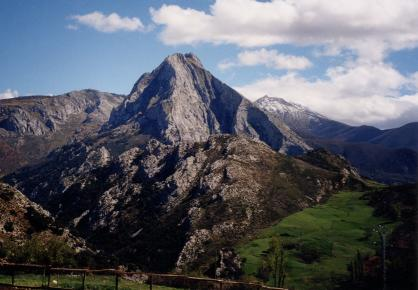
Cantabrian Range (Peña Ventosa).

The mountain ranges surrounding the Meseta Central are:

- Montes de León
- Cordillera Cantábrica
  - Picos de Europa
  - Montes Vascos
- Sistema Ibérico
  - Sierra de la Demanda
  - Picos de Urbión
  - Sierra de Albarracín
  - Serranía de Cuenca
- Sierra Morena
  - Sierra Madrona
  - Sierra de Aracena
  - Sierra de Hornachuelos

==== Mountain ranges outside the Meseta Central ====
There are mountain ranges that do not border the Meseta Central. One of them is the Pyrenees, one of the highest mountain ranges in Spain and one of the most extensive with its 415 km of length and its 150 km of average width. The mountain range is located on the border with France, in the extreme northeast of the country, on the isthmus of the Iberian Peninsula. They belong to the autonomous communities of the Basque Country, Navarre, Aragon and Catalonia. The Spanish, French and Andorran Pyrenees can be distinguished by their political affiliation. The Spanish Pyrenees are home to the Pre-Pyrenees, a mountain range with peaks lower than those of the Pyrenees, located in the south of the Pyrenees; the Navarre Pyrenees, with peaks not exceeding 3000 m; the Aragonese Pyrenees, which have the highest peaks (many of them exceeding 3000 m); and the Catalan Pyrenees, which also have peaks above 3000 meters. The highest elevation of the mountain range is the Pico Aneto with its 3404 m, being the second highest peak of the Iberian Peninsula. To the south of the Pyrenees extends the Ebro depression.

In the extreme northeast of the Iberian Peninsula are the Catalan Mediterranean System, a group of mountain chains located in the autonomous community of Catalonia. They have a southwest-northeast orientation and extend along 250 km parallel to the Mediterranean coast, and go from the province of Tarragona to the Gulf of Roses. The system is formed by two mountain ranges: the Catalan Coastal Range, located along the coast, and the Catalan Pre-Coastal Range, located further northwest.

In the southeast of the Iberian Peninsula are the Baetic Systems, a group of mountain chains and ranges that form a geographic unit. The Baetic mountain systems are divided into two main groups: the Penibaetic System, located in the southern area, along the coast with the Mediterranean Sea; the Subbaetic System, located further north and bordering the east of Sierra Morena and the south of the Iberian system; and the Prebaetic System, located to the east of the Penibaetic system. Some of the Baetic mountain chains are the Sierra Nevada, the Sierra de Cazorla and the Sierra de Grazalema. The highest peak of the mountain range and of the Iberian Peninsula is the Mulhacén (3478 m).

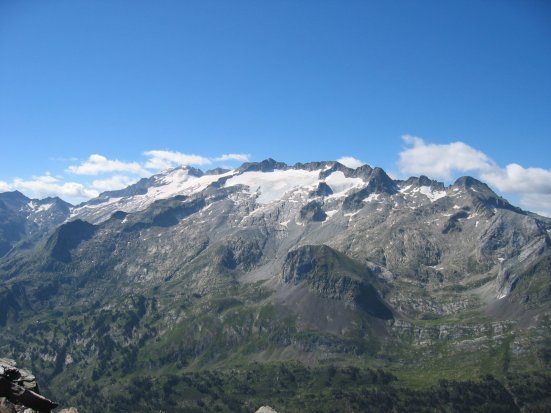
Pyrenees (Aneto Massif).

In the northwest of the Peninsula, behind the Montes de León, within Galicia, is the Galician Massif.

The mountain ranges outside the Meseta Central are:

- Pirineos (Pyrenees)
  - Prepirineos (Pre-Pyrenees)
  - Pirineos Navarros (Navarre Pyrenees)
  - Pirineos Aragoneses (Aragonese Pyrenees)
  - Pirineos Catalanes (Catalan Pyrenees)
- Cordilleras Costero-Catalanas (Catalan Mediterranean System). Located to the northeast, they constitute a double mountainous alignment that run parallel to the Mediterranean coast.
  - Cordillera Litoral (Catalan Coastal Range)
  - Cordillera Prelitoral (Catalan Pre-Coastal Range)
- Cordilleras Béticas (Baetic System). Located to the south, they constitute a double mountainous alignment that run parallel along the Mediterranean coast.
  - Cordillera Penibética (Penibaetic System)
    - Serranía de Ronda
    - Sierra Nevada
    - Sierra de Baza / Sierra de los Filabres
    - Sierra Espuña
    - Sierra de Gádor
  - Cordillera Subbética (Subbaetic System)
    - Sierra de Cazorla
    - Sierra Sur de Jaén
    - Sierra de Grazalema
    - Sierra de Huétor
    - Sierra de Segura
    - Sierra de Castril
    - Sierra de Orce / Sierra de María
    - Sierra de las Estancias
  - Cordillera Prebética (Prebaetic System)
- Macizo Galaico-Leonés (Galician Massif). Ancient and very eroded terrain with a rounded shape. It occupies most of the territory of Galicia.

=== Depressions ===
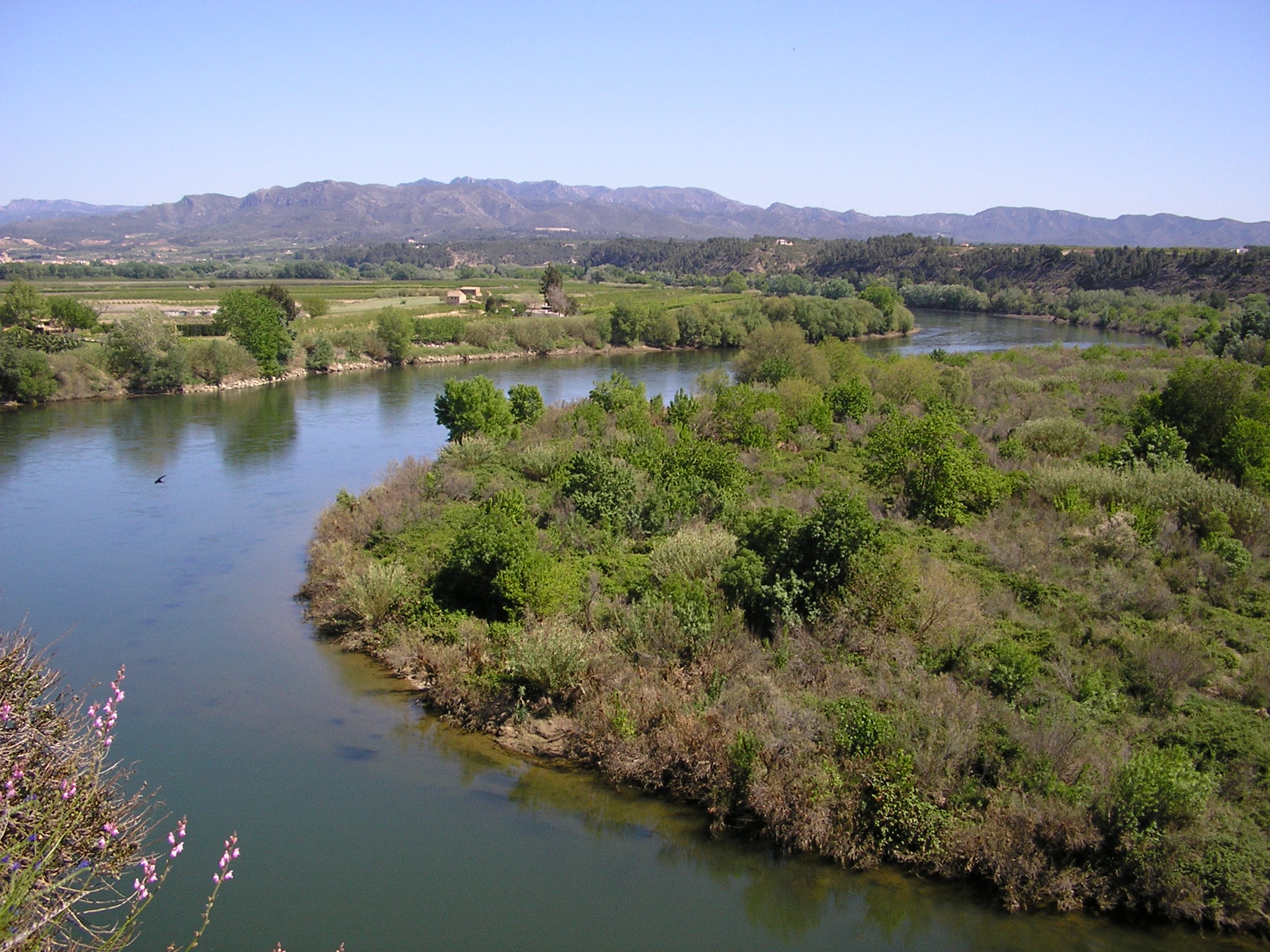
Ebro River depression.

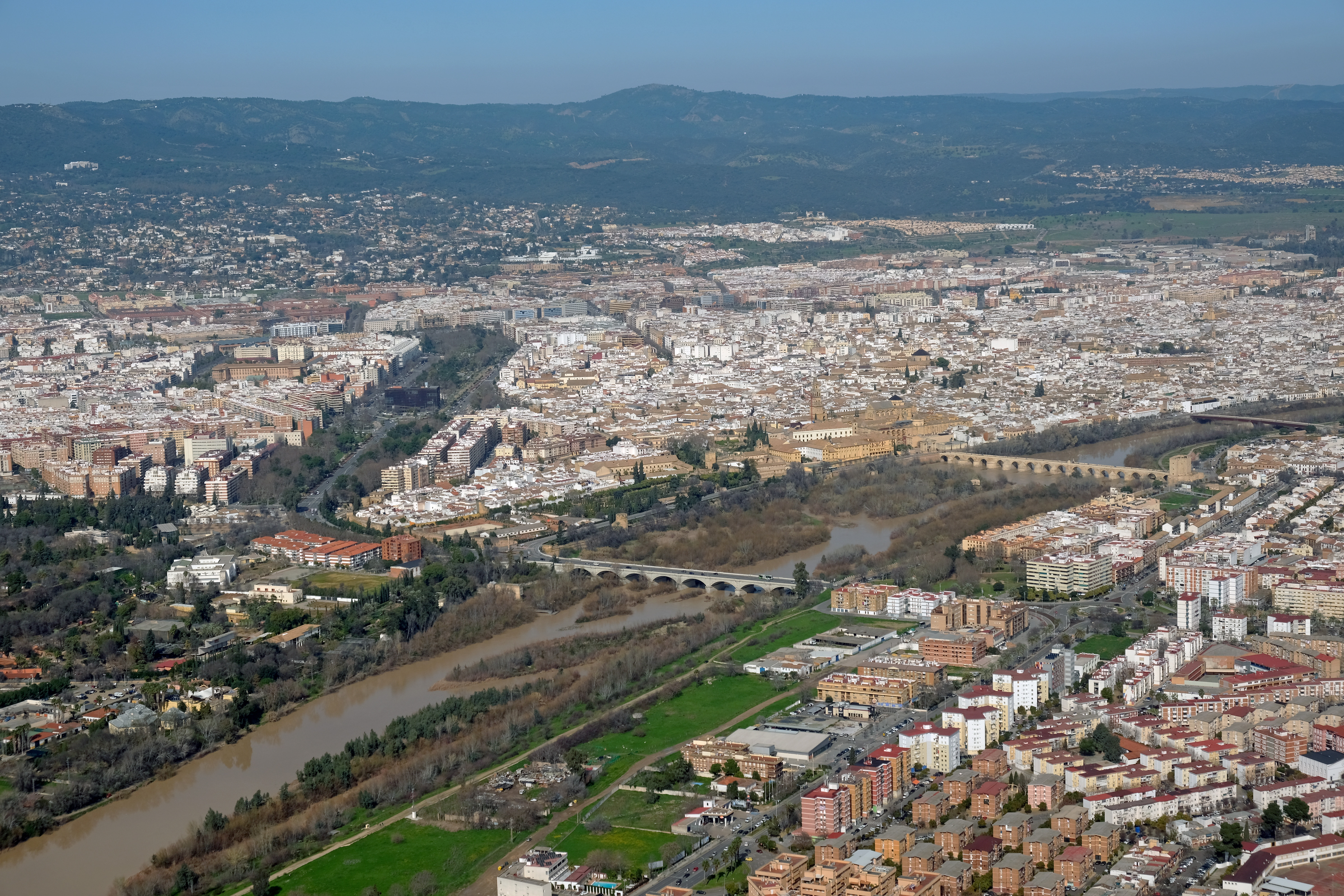
Guadalquivir River depression.

The two main depressions of peninsular Spain are the Ebro and Guadalquivir depressions. These are outside of the Meseta and were pre-alpine basins or pits that, after the Cenozoic orogenesis, were left between the alpine ranges and the ancient massifs. They are triangular in shape and were filled by great thicknesses of Cenozoic and Quaternary sediments.

- The Ebro river depression is located in the surroundings of the Ebro river, that is, in the northeast of the Iberian Peninsula, has an area of approximately 40,000 km^{2} and a length of 900 km. It extends from west to east through the autonomous communities of La Rioja, Navarre, Aragon and Catalonia, and ends at the Mediterranean Sea. In its northern limit are the Pyrenees, in the east it limits with the Catalan Mediterranean System, and in the south and west with the Iberian system. The depression has an average altitude of 200 meters above sea level, which stands out with the high elevations that surround it. At the mouth of the river is the Ebro Delta, an area protected by the Ebro Delta Natural Park. It has marine and continental deposits, of great thickness in the mountainous ridges (conglomerates) and of lesser thickness in the center of the depression (sandstones, marls, gypsum, salts and limestones). The variety in the hardness of the materials and the arid climate have given rise to different forms of relief.
  - The somontanos or Pyrenean and Iberian foothills are flat but slightly sloping terrains between the outer mountain chains and the center of the depression. They are formed by thick and hard materials from the mountainous reliefs transported by the rivers. In them, mainly in the Pyrenean somontano, mallos or rocky towers are formed, individualized by erosion taking advantage of the vertical joints (as in the Riglos) as well as erosive pits or depressions in the softer materials, which can be small (giving rise to salty plains of little depth and temporary character) or of great dimension (pits of Huesca and Barbastro).
  - In the center of the depression, the strata are horizontal and alternately hard limestones and clays, marls and soft gypsum. As a result, there is a relief of molars or flats where limestones are preserved, and badlands on the softer materials, as a consequence of the aridity of the area.
- The Baetic Depression is located in the southwest of the Iberian Peninsula, has an area of approximately 35,000 km^{2}, a length of 600 km and the river around which it is articulated is the Guadalquivir. It extends from east to west in a large part of the autonomous community of Andalusia, and ends in the Atlantic Ocean. In its northern and northwestern limit is the Sierra Morena, and in the east and southeast limits with the Penibaetic System. The depression has an average altitude of 100 meters above sea level, making it the lowest in the peninsula. At the mouth of the river there are marshes protected by the Doñana National Park. The predominance of clayey materials has given rise to gently rolling countryside. When the limestone mantles emerge, tables and hills or alcores are formed. The depression was filled by alluvial deposits from the Guadalquivir River, its tributaries and marine sediments. The lands are fertile, even more so in the Vega del Guadalquivir.

=== Coasts ===
The coasts of the Peninsula are curved and with a rectilinear contour but not very indented. High, rocky coasts abound in the north, and low, sandy coasts in the southeast. The coasts of the Balearic Islands have rocky stretches, and the coasts of the Canary Islands have cliffs.

The almost 4600 km of coastline of peninsular Spain belong to the Mediterranean Sea in the northeast, east, southeast and south, to the Cantabrian Sea in the north, and to the Atlantic Ocean in the northwest and southwest.

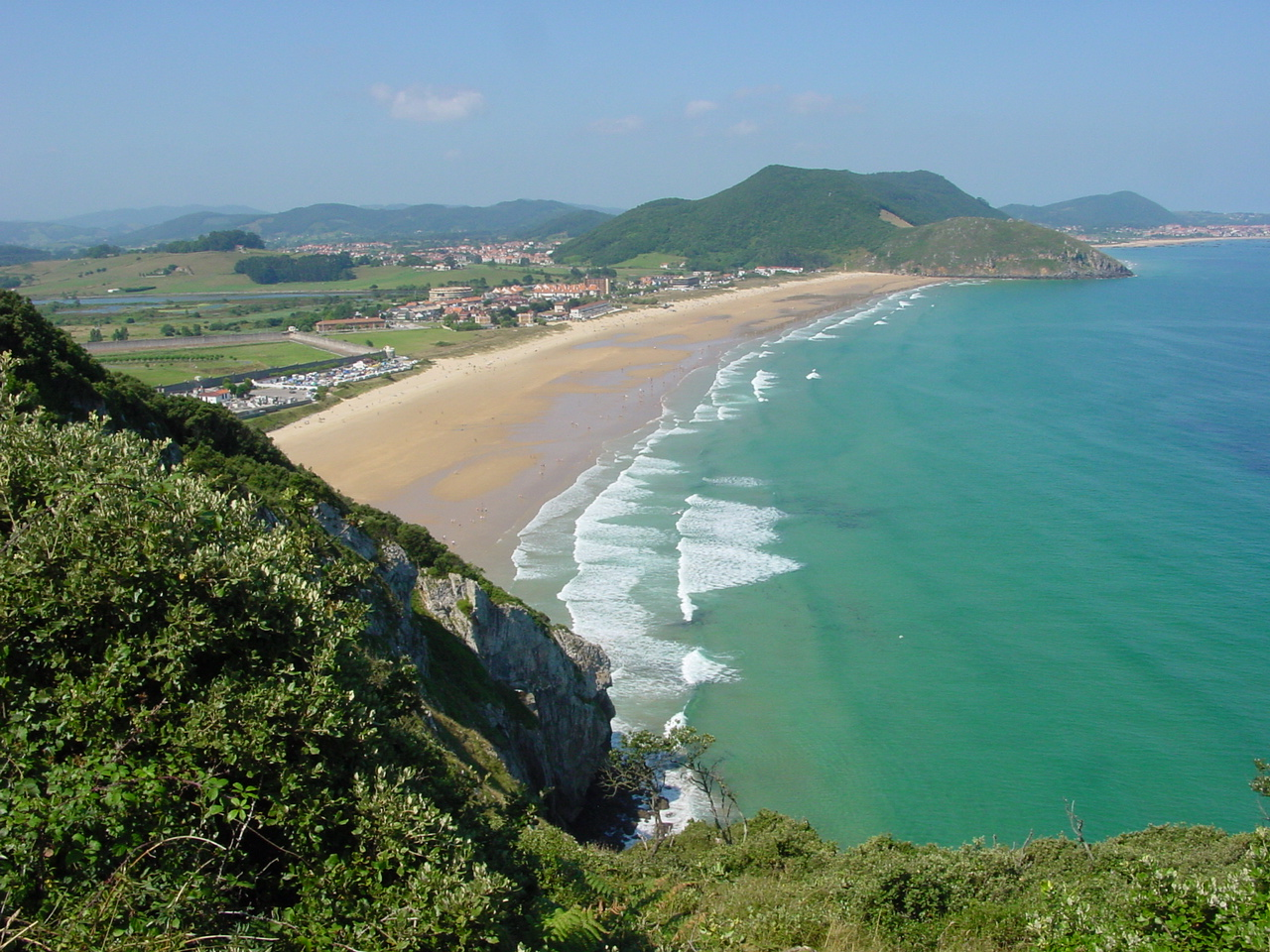
Cantabrian coast (Berria beach in Santoña).

- Cantabrian coast

The Cantabrian Sea bathes the northern coast of the peninsula, oriented from west to east and with an approximate length of 550 km. It runs from Estaca de Bares in Galicia, and the border between the Basque Country and France. In general terms it is rectilinear and is characterized by the abundance of cliffs, wave-cut platforms and short rias, the longest being the one of Bilbao, as well as by the scarcity of beaches and plains. The northernmost point of the Iberian Peninsula is at Estaca de Bares (43º 47' 36'' N), located on this coast. In addition to this cape, there are other important ones such as Peñas in Asturias, and Ajo in Cantabria.

The main elements of the Cantabrian coast, ordered from east to west, are:

1. Cabo Machichaco (Cape Machichaco)
2. Golfo de Vizcaya (Gulf of Biscay)
3. Cabo de Ajo (Cape of Ajo)
4. Cabo de Peñas (Cape of Peñas)
5. Estaca de Bares (Estaca de Bares Cape)
- Galician Atlantic coast

The Atlantic Ocean bathes the west-facing coasts of Galicia, oriented from north to south. It runs from the tip of the Ria de Ribadeo to the mouth of the Minho river, the border between Galicia and Portugal. It is the most articulated coastline in Spain with abundant and extensive rias that penetrate between 25 and 35 km inland. The mountainous terrain of Galicia means that cliffs abound and beaches are scarce. The rias are divided into high rias and low rias. Some of the most important high rias are Foz, Ortigueira and Viveiro; and some of the most important low rias are Vigo, Pontevedra and Arousa. The westernmost point of peninsular Spain is at Cabo Touriñan (9º 18' 19''), located in the province of La Coruña.

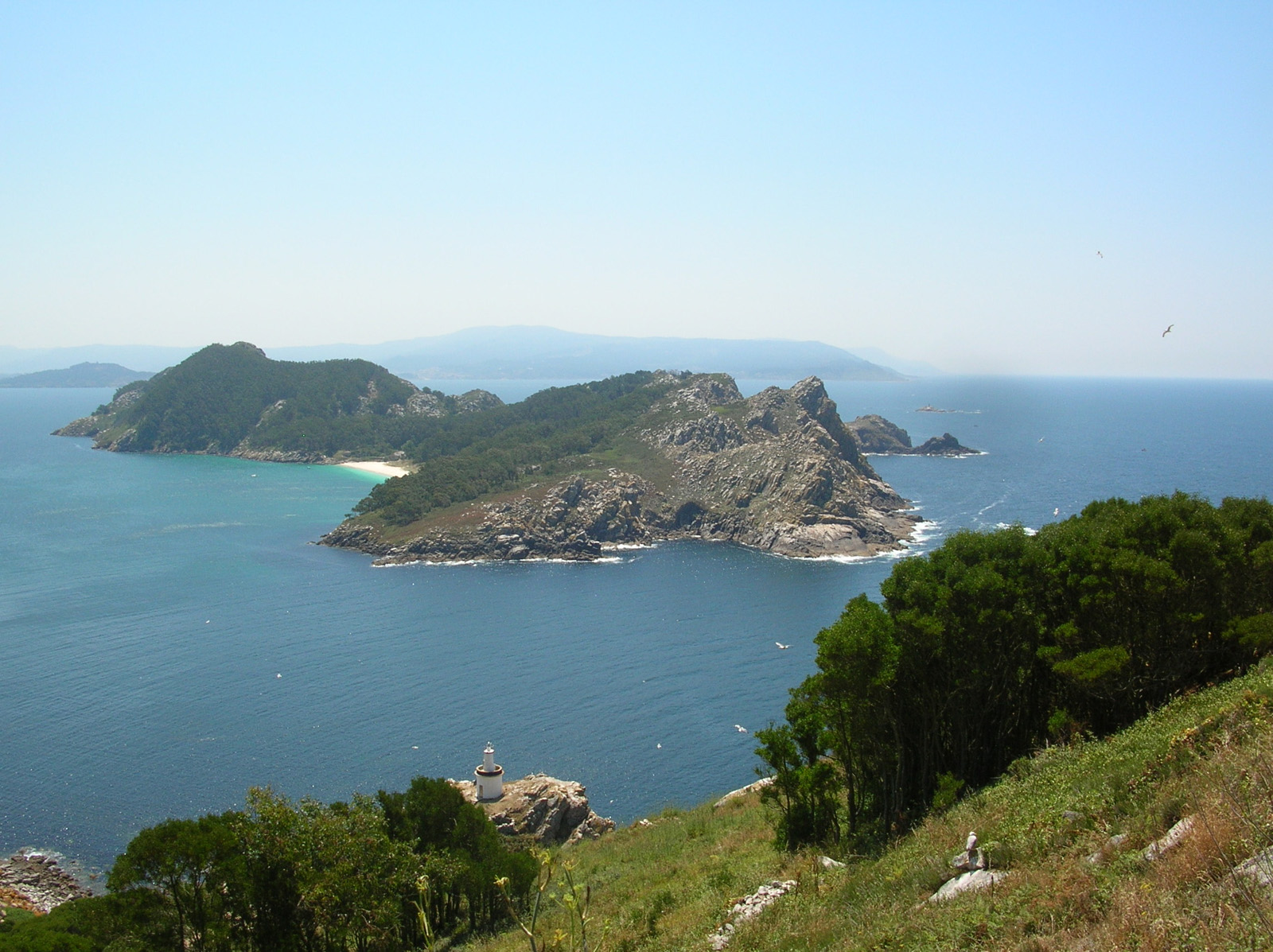
Cíes Islands, in the Ria de Vigo (Galicia).

The main elements of the Galician Atlantic coast, ordered from north to south, are:

1. Punta de Estaca de Bares (Estaba de Bares Point)
2. Ría de Ferrol (Ria of Ferrol)
3. Ría de Laxe (Ria of Laxe)
4. Cabo de Ortegal (Cape Ortegal)
5. Cabo Touriñan (Cape Touriñan)
6. Cabo Finisterre (Cape Finisterre)
7. Ría de Corcubión (Ria of Corcubión)
8. Ría de Muros y Noya (Ria of Muros y Noya)
9. Ría de Arosa (Ria de Arousa)
10. Ría de Pontevedra (Ria of Pontevedra)
11. Ría de Vigo (Vigo Ria)
- Andalusian Atlantic coast

The Atlantic Ocean bathes the coasts of the autonomous community of Andalusia between the border with Portugal and the Punta de Tarifa, being this cape the southernmost of the peninsula (36º 00' 00'' N). The Punta de Tarifa is part of the Strait of Gibraltar and separates the Atlantic Ocean and the Mediterranean Sea. The Andalusian Atlantic coast has a northwest-southeast orientation, and is characterized by being very rectilinear and having almost exclusively beaches. Further inland, marshes and dune fields abound as the terrain is very low (rarely exceeding 50 meters) and flat (the mouth of the Guadalquivir River occupies almost the entire territory). This stretch of coastline forms the Gulf of Cadiz.

The main elements of the Andalusian Atlantic coast, ordered from west to east, are:

1. Golfo de Cádiz (Gulf of Cadiz)
2. Cabo de Trafalgar (Cape Trafalgar)
3. Punta de Tarifa (Point of Tarifa)
4. Estrecho de Gibraltar (Strait of Gibraltar)

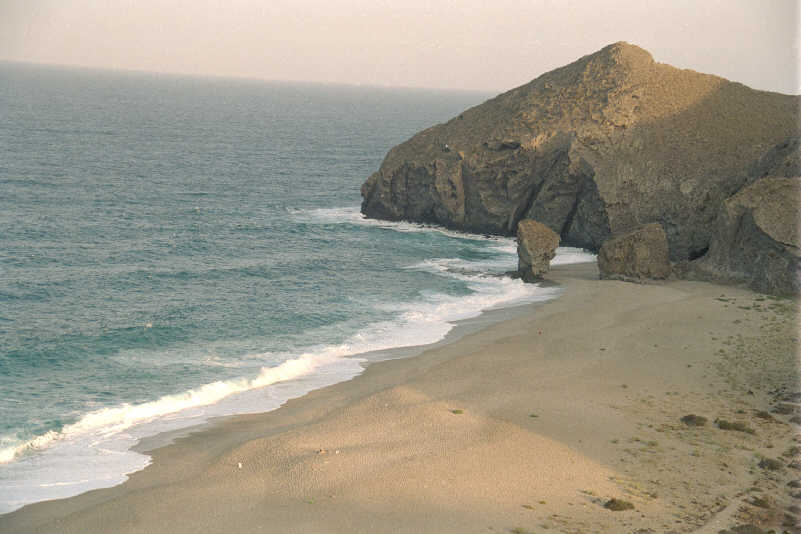
Andalusian coast (Playa de los Muertos in the province of Almeria).

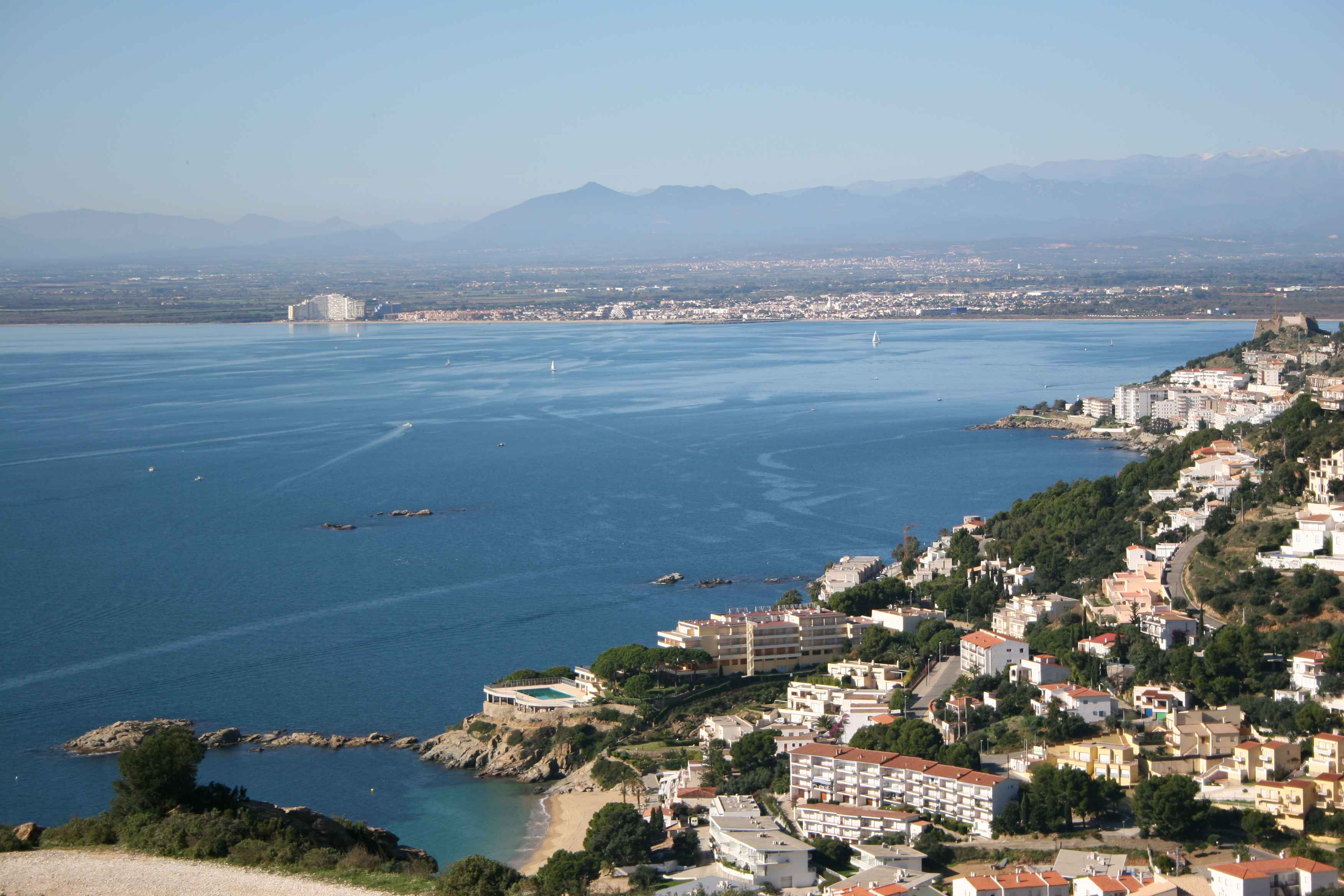
Catalan coast (Gulf of Roses).

- Mediterranean Coast

The coast of the Mediterranean Sea is the longest in Spain. It runs from the Strait of Gibraltar, located at the southern end of Andalusia, to the border between Catalonia and France. The coast of Andalusia is oriented from west to east and is slightly articulated. In general, beaches abound, although there are also many beaches in areas where the Penibaetic System reaches the coast. The gulf and Cabo de Gata, located in the extreme southeast of Andalusia, is the boundary between the Andalusian coast and the Levantine coast, which is home to the Region of Murcia and the Valencian Community. This stretch of Mediterranean coast has a southwest-northeast orientation, and is less articulated than the Andalusian coast, with a notable predominance of beaches. The capes of Palos in Murcia and La Nau in Alicante are worth mentioning. Next to Cape Palos is the Mar Menor, a large saltwater lake separated from the Mediterranean Sea by a thin strip of land. Between Cap de la Nau and the delta of the Ebro River is the Gulf of Valencia, characterized by having only beaches on its coast because the terrain is very flat. From the Ebro delta to the French border extends the Catalan coast, oriented from southwest to northeast. This coast is more articulated than that of the gulf of Valencia and has more flats, due to the proximity of the Catalan Mediterranean System to the coast. The easternmost point of the Iberian Peninsula is Cap de Creus (3º 19' 19'' E), located in the northeast of this coast.

The main elements of the Mediterranean coast, ordered from southwest to northeast, are:

1. Golfo de Almería (Gulf of Almería)
2. Cabo de Palos (Cape Palos)
3. Cabo de la Nao (Cap de la Nau)
4. Golfo de Valencia (Gulf of Valencia)
5. Delta del Ebro (Ebro Delta)
6. Golfo de Rosas (Gulf of Roses)
7. Cabo de Creus (Cap de Creus)
- Baetic Mediterranean coast

The coast stretches from Gibraltar to Cap de la Nau, in Alicante. Due to the reliefs of the Baetic Systems it has an abrupt coastline, but just as there are rocky coasts there are also low coasts. Such is the case of the Gulf of Alicante and the Segura basin. The albuferas (coastal lagoons) are common in this area, such as Alicante, the Mar Menor and Torrevieja.

The main elements of the Mediterranean coast, ordered from southwest to southeast, are:

1. Estrecho de Gibraltar (Strait of Gibraltar)
2. Golfo de Almería (Gulf of Almería)
3. Golfo de Mazarrón (Gulf of Mazarrón)
4. Golfo de Alicante (Gulf of Alicante)
- Valencian Mediterranean coast

It presents an arc that spans the Cap de La Nao and ends in the salient of the Ebro delta. The albuferas and marshes as far as Peñíscola are common. Among the most important coastal lagoons there's the Albufera Natural Park in Valencia.

The main elements of the Mediterranean coast, ordered from south to north, are:

1. Golfo de Valencia (Gulf of Valencia)
- Catalan Mediterranean coast

It stretches from the Ebro delta to Cap de Creus. It presents very contrasted terrains, from deltas and plains to cliffy coasts. The most important delta is the Ebro delta, and the Llobregat and Tordera deltas also stand out.

The main elements of the Mediterranean coast, ordered from south to north, are:

1. Golfo de Rosas (Gulf of Roses)

== Island relief ==
Two archipelagos of islands belong to Spain. One of them is the Balearic Islands, located in the Mediterranean Sea and 90 km east of Cap de la Nau (Alicante). The other is the Canary Islands, located in the Atlantic Ocean, 1,050 km southwest of Cadiz and 100 km west of the African coast.

=== Relief of the Balearic Islands ===
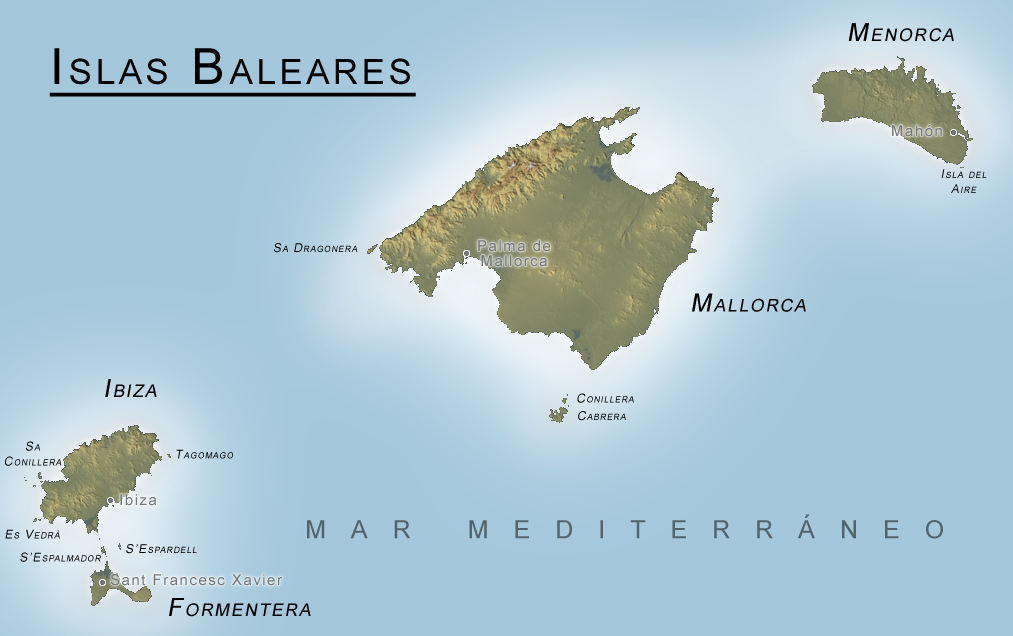
Map of the Balearic Islands.

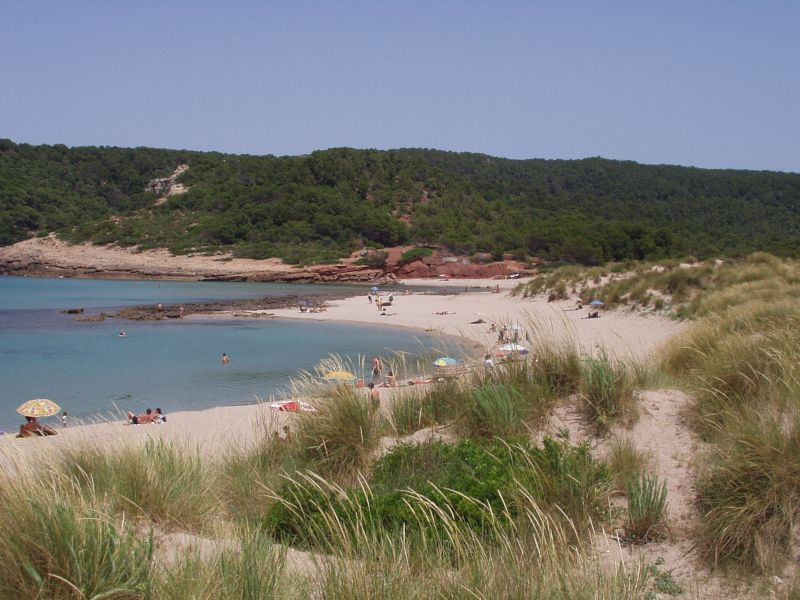
Menorca beach.

The Balearic Islands is an archipelago located in the Mediterranean Sea, 80 km east of the Iberian Peninsula. It has an average latitude of 39º 30' N. 270 km separate the western and eastern limits of the archipelago, and 160 km from the northern and southern ends. The three largest and most important islands that make up the Balearic Islands are Ibiza, Mallorca and Menorca. The three main islands are aligned in that order oriented from southwest to northeast. Apart from these three, there are other smaller islands such as Formentera and Cabrera. The relief of the Balearic Islands is dominated by flat, low-lying areas, except for the Sierra de la Tramontana, located in Mallorca.

The relief of the Balearic archipelago is related to the Baetic System and the Catalan Mediterranean System, since Mallorca and Ibiza are joined underwater through a strait; and Menorca is joined with the Catalan Mediterranean System.

- Mallorca

Mallorca is the largest island of the archipelago and the most rugged. It is located in the center of the Balearic Islands, has a surface of 3620,42 km^{2} and an approximately square shape. Its terrain is quite flat except for the Sierra de Tramontana, located on the north coast of the island. Here are the highest peaks of all the islands which are the Puig Major (1445 m) and Puig de Massanella (1348 m). Except for the coasts near the Sierra de Tramontana where cliffs abound, beaches are very predominant on the Mallorcan coast.

- Menorca

Menorca is the second largest island of the archipelago with a surface area of 694.39 km^{2}, and is the most northeasterly island. It has an elongated shape, with a remarkably articulated coastline. On the island there are small hills that exceed 200 meters and, in general, the terrain is very flat. The maximum altitude is the hill of El Toro with its 355 meters. The coast of Menorca is interspersed with small cliffs, extensive beaches and coves.

- Ibiza

Ibiza is the third largest island of the Balearic Islands with its 571.04 km^{2} of surface, and is located to the southwest of Mallorca, being only 80 km to the east of the peninsula. The shape of the island is elongated, and the coast is quite articulated. It has a terrain of smooth forms and small hills located in the interior zone. The highest point is the hill of La Talaiassa (475 m). On the coast of Ibiza there are both high coast and beaches and coves.

- Formentera

Formentera is the fourth largest island of the archipelago with its 83.2 km^{2} of surface. It is located 3.6 km south of the island of Ibiza, its terrain is very flat and the highest point is the hill of La Mola (192 m). On the coast of Formentera beaches and coves abound.

- Cabrera

==== Coasts of the Balearic Islands ====
The coasts of the Balearic Islands are high, since in many places the mountains reach the sea. If the sea bathes a plain, the coast is low and sandy.

=== Relief of the Canary Islands ===
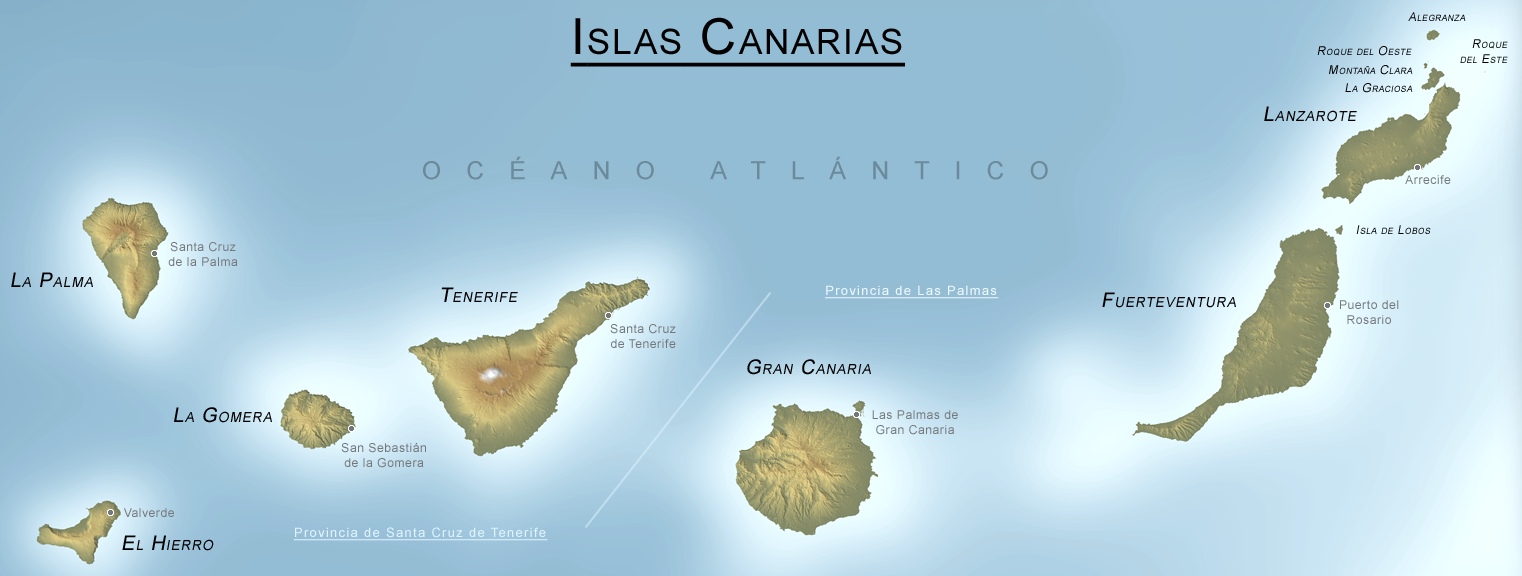
Map of the Canary Islands.

The archipelago of the Canary Islands is located in the North Atlantic Ocean, 1050 km southwest of the coast of Cadiz and 100 km west of the African coast. 460 km separate the western and eastern ends of the archipelago and 190 km separate the northern and southern limits of the archipelago. The Canary Islands are composed of seven main islands arranged from west to east and two islets, Alegranza and Graciosa. It is of volcanic origin due to its formation by the accumulation of sediments from the eruptions, which in turn came from the Atlantic seafloor. The terrain of the islands is mountainous, with an important presence of volcanoes and high coasts. The highest of them is the Teide (3715 m), located on the island of Tenerife, being also the highest of the Spanish territory and the third largest volcano in the world from its base.

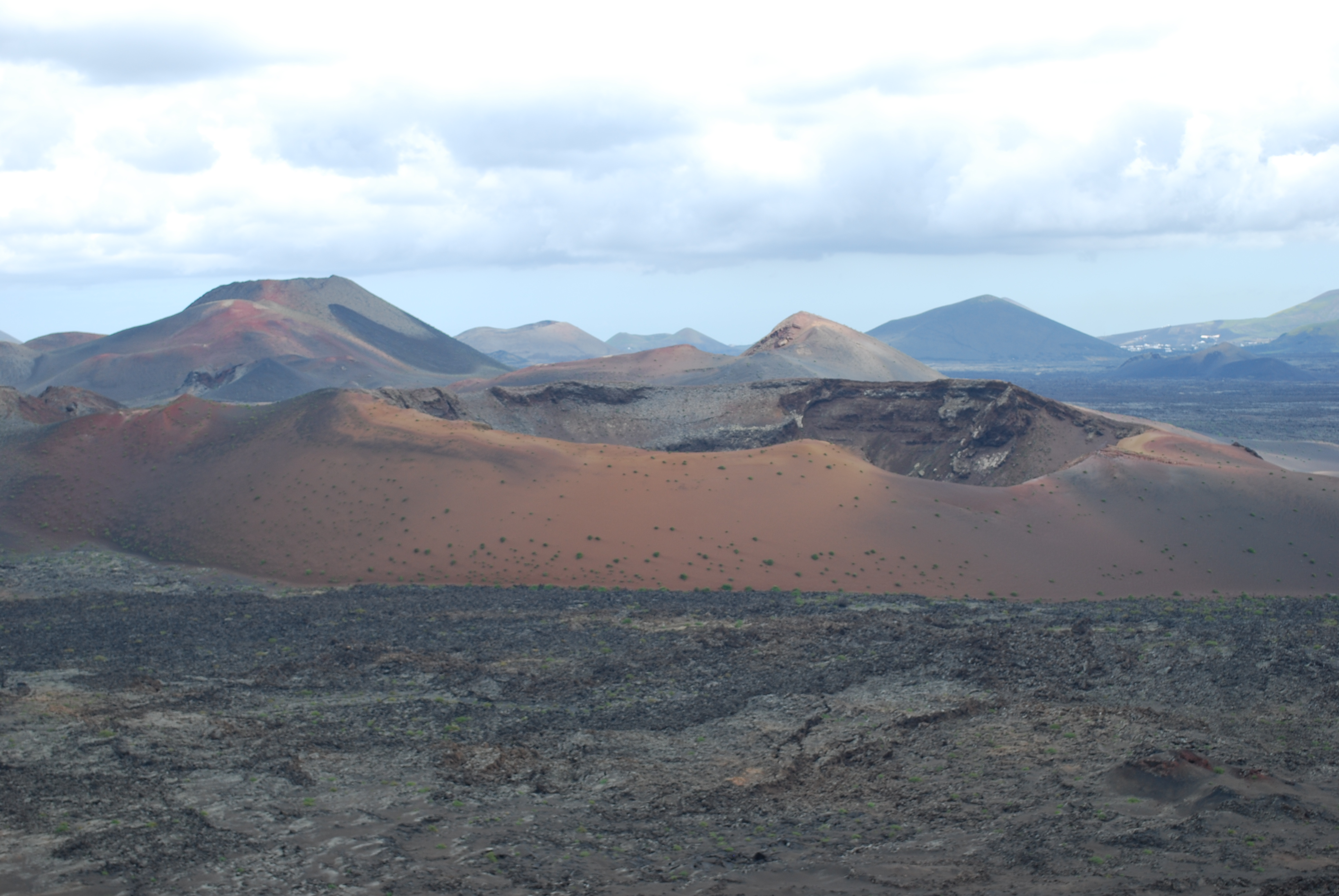
Volcanoes of Timanfaya (Lanzarote island).

- Lanzarote

Lanzarote is the most northeastern island of the archipelago and has a combined surface with its dependent islets of 845.93 km^{2}. Its terrain is not very rugged although there are numerous volcanoes of low altitude. The Peñas del Chache, with 670 meters, are the highest of the island, and on the coast alternate beaches and wave-cut platforms. The island has an elongated shape, oriented from north to south, with the ancient massifs of Famara and Los Ajaches at the ends, the intermediate plain being covered by recent volcanic material. To the north of the island is a group of small islands, the so-called Chinijo archipelago.

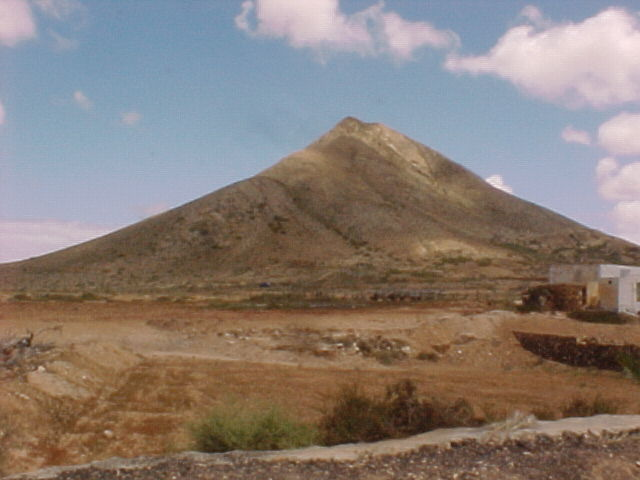
Tindaya Mountain, (Fuerteventura Island).

- Fuerteventura

Fuerteventura is an island located 10 km southwest of Lanzarote and 101 km west of the coast of Western Sahara, the oldest of the archipelago. It has an area of 1659.71 km^{2} (the second largest of the archipelago) and a terrain characterized by smooth shapes in a territory modeled intensely by erosion, with little presence of recent volcanism. On the coast, sandy beaches abound, although you can find wave-cut platforms and cliffs, especially on the western slope. The highest point of the island is the Pico de la Zarza (807 m), on the peninsula of Jandía. The island has an elongated shape, oriented from north to south.

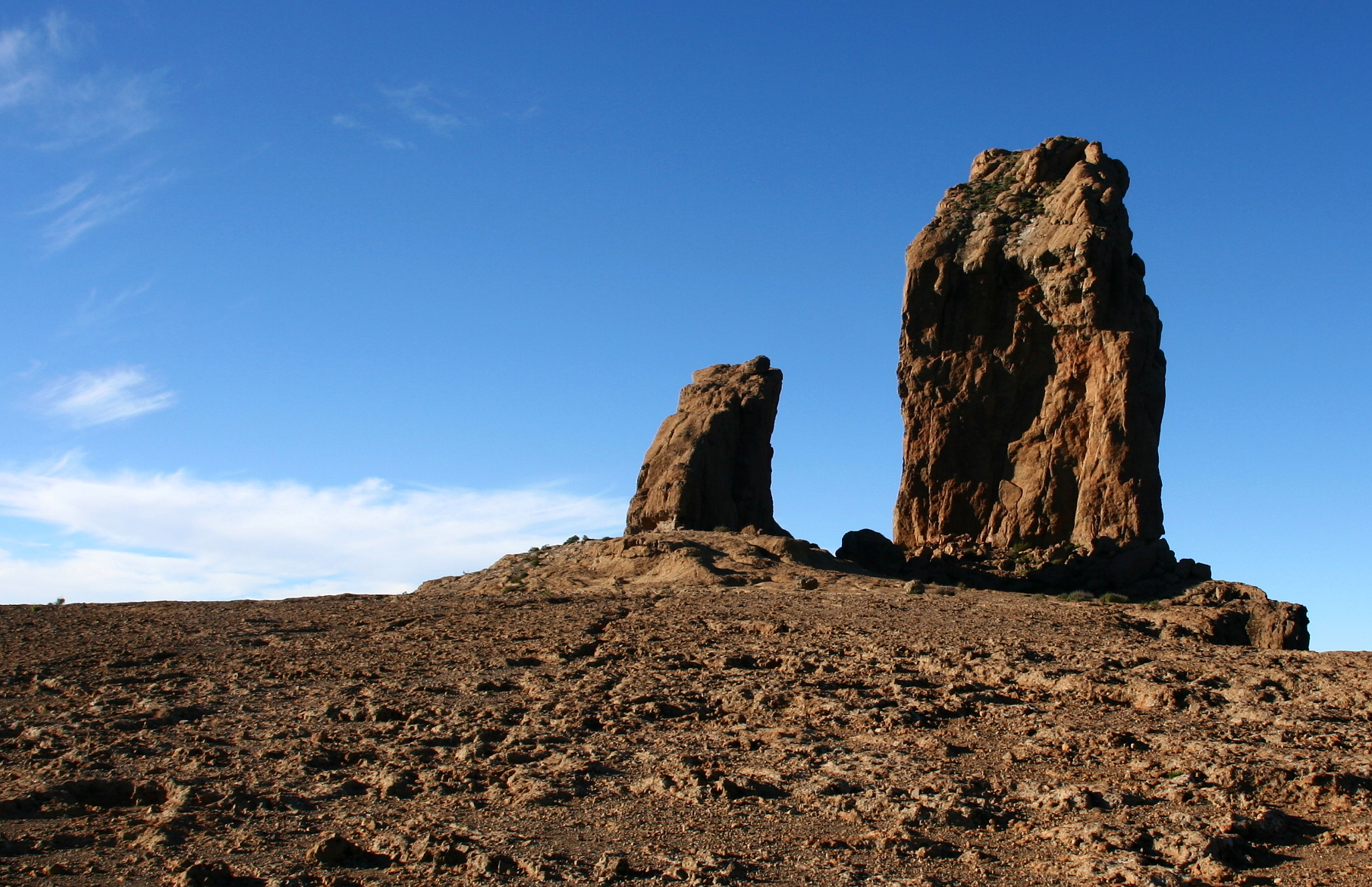
Roque Nublo (Gran Canaria Island).

- Gran Canaria

Gran Canaria is one of the islands located in the central area of the archipelago and 85 km west of Fuerteventura, is the third largest island, after Tenerife and Fuerteventuraa, despite how confusing its name may be. It has an area of 1560 km^{2} and a very mountainous terrain The island, circular in shape, is articulated around a central plateau culminating in the Pico de las Nieves (1949 m), surrounded by several volcanic calderas; it is also important the presence of ancient volcanic massifs such as Güigüí. The network of ravines is radial in shape, organized from the central summit. There is a great variety of volcanic plugs of different nature, among which Roque Nublo stands out. On the coasts, cliffs abound (especially in the west) and the wave-cut platforms, with numerous coves at the mouth of the ravines and extensive beaches in the south.

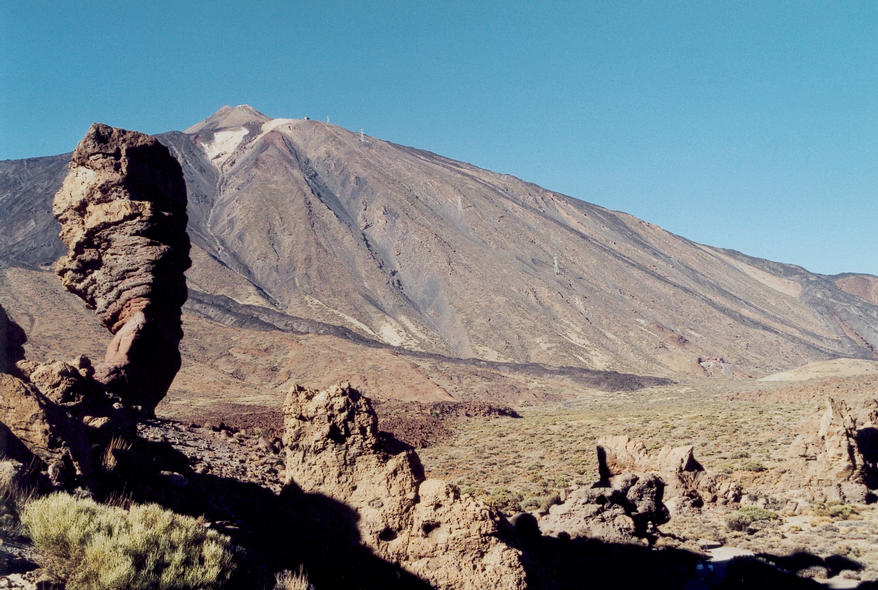
Teide Volcano (Tenerife Island).

- Tenerife

Tenerife is the largest island of the archipelago with a surface area of 2034 km^{2}, and is located 60 km west of Gran Canaria, in the central part of the Canary Islands. The terrain of the island is very mountainous and is articulated around the stratovolcano Teide (3715 m), the highest peak of the Canary Islands and Spain, besides being the third largest volcano on Earth from its base. Teide closes to the north the impressive amphitheater that is the volcanic caldera of Las Cañadas, with a flat bottom at 2100 meters. At the three vertexes of the island are the volcanic massifs of Anaga, whose maximum altitude is 1024 meters, Teno and Adeje being the oldest territories of the island, from which depart the volcanic ridges that unite in the center to form the Teide-Cañadas complex. A characteristic element of the island are the Valles de La Orotava and Güimar, extensive depressions on the flanks of the island formed by large landslides. The coasts are interspersed with beaches and cliffs, although the latter are more abundant. The island has a triangular shape with a small peninsula at its northeast vertex. Among the many volcanic tubes existing on the island, the so-called Cueva del Viento stands out, located in the northern municipality of Icod de los Vinos, which is the largest volcanic tube in Europe and one of the largest in the world, although for a long time it was even considered the largest in the world. Another key mountainous terrain worthy of note is the Anaga mountain range in the northeast of the island. It is the only non-central mountain range in the Canary Islands.

- La Gomera

La Gomera is a small island located 29 km west of Tenerife. It has an area of 372 km^{2} and a rounded shape. Its relief is very mountainous and is articulated around a central plateau. This has its highest point in the Alto de Garajonay, which with its 1487 meters of altitude is the highest elevation of the island. The valleys that radiate from the center follow one another in the geography of the island, and on the coasts there are abundant cliffs and wave-cut platforms. The volcanic plugs such as the one in Agando are very characteristic.

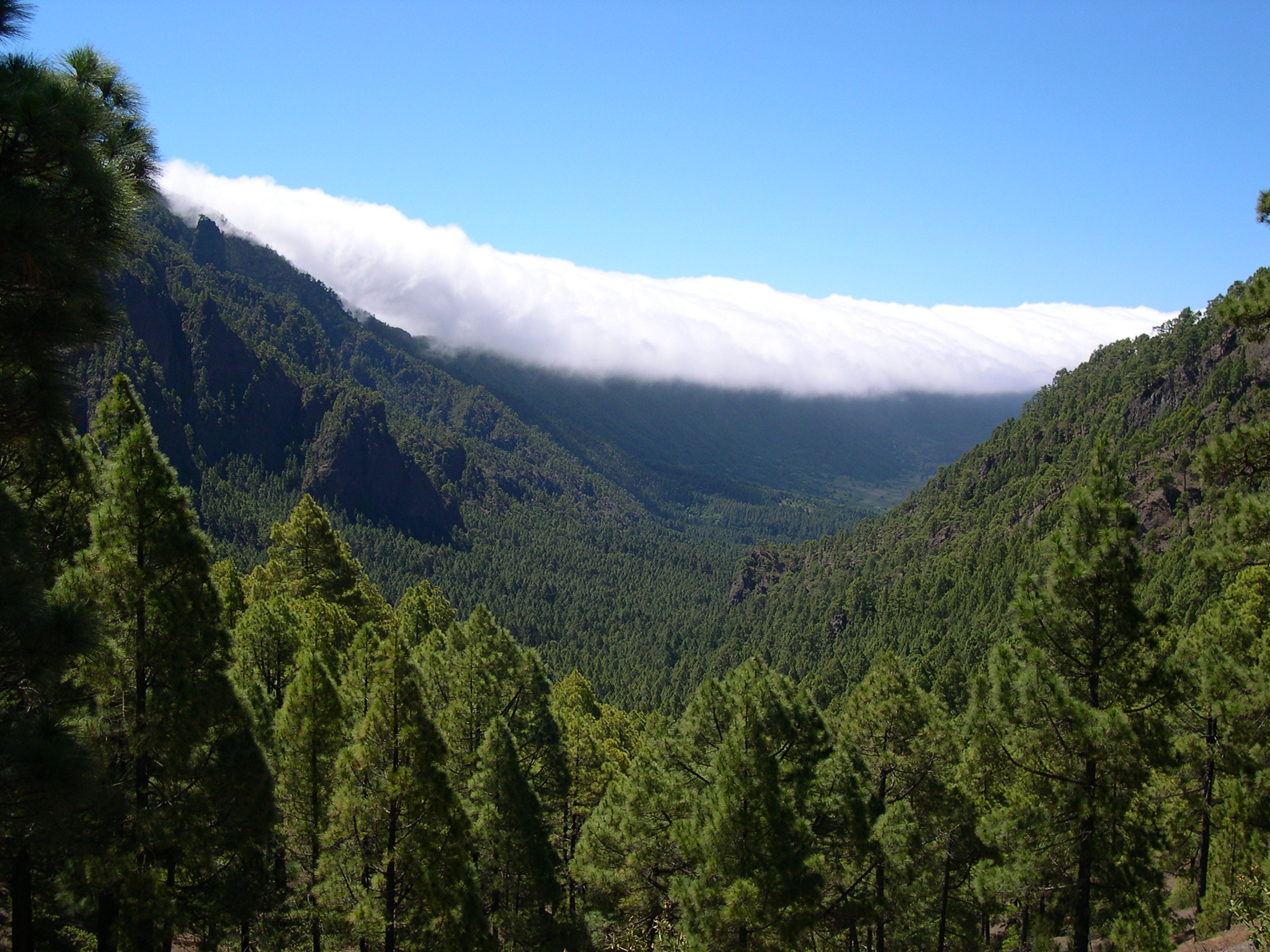
Caldera de Taburiente (La Palma Island).

- La Palma

La Palma is the most northwestern island of the archipelago and has an area of 708.33 km^{2}. It is 60 km northwest of La Gomera and has a triangular shape (approximately). The terrain of the island is quite mountainous, where volcanoes, mountain chains and valleys abound. The most outstanding relief element is the Caldera de Taburiente, a mountainous area whose peaks are arranged in the shape of a C, creating several valleys. As its name indicates, the Caldera de Taburiente is a volcanic caldera, abruptly emptied by a spill whose opening gave rise to the Barranco de las Angustias, which collects the largest amount of rainwater on the island. The highest peak is the Roque de los Muchachos with its 2426 meters of altitude. The coastline is very rugged and there are many cliffs and shallows due to the proximity of the mountains and valleys. Beaches are scarce and small in size.

- El Hierro

El Hierro is the most southwestern island of the archipelago and of Spain. It has an area of 278 km^{2} and a triangular shape. It is 65 km southwest of La Gomera and 66 km south of La Palma. The terrain is marked by the presence of El Golfo, to the north, a bay formed by the collapse of part of the island building, with very steep ridges. The maximum altitude of the island is in the Pico de Malpaso with 1501 meters. In the northeastern area is the Nisdafe plateau and to the west of the island there is a wide region with little ruggedness and numerous examples of recent volcanism. The coasts of the island are generally very rugged, with a few pebble beaches.

==== Coasts of the Canary Islands ====
The coasts of the Canary Islands are some high coasts, with cliffs; and others of low coasts with sandy or stony beaches, where dunes are formed. If it is of volcanic origin, the beach has black sand.

== Relief of the plazas de soberanía ==
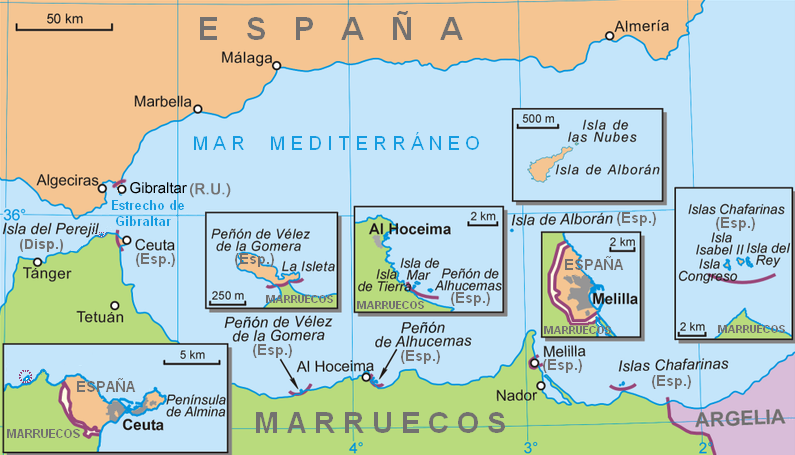
Map of Spanish cities and islands in Africa.

The plazas de soberanía is the set of Spanish possessions on the north coast of Africa.

- Ceuta

Ceuta is an autonomous city located on the north coast of Africa, on the Strait of Gibraltar and borders Morocco. Its municipal district has an area of 18.5 km^{2} and more than three quarters of its perimeter are coastal. The terrain is slightly mountainous in the west, in the border area with Morocco. It is worth mentioning at its eastern end the cape of the Punta de Almina, and Mount Hacho, 195 m high. Mount Anyera, with an altitude of 349 meters, is the highest point in Ceuta. The coastline is dominated by wave-cut platforms and cliffs rather than beaches. It also includes the Perejil Island, located 200 meters north of the coast to the northwest of the municipality and has an area of 1.35 km^{2}.

- Melilla

Melilla is a municipality located on the North African coast, south of the Andalusian coast and has a border with Morocco. Its municipality has an area of 12 km^{2} and has a semicircle shape oriented to the east, where the coast, almost rectilinear, faces east. The terrain is very flat, where the maximum altitudes are close to 30 meters in the west. The coast is dominated by beaches.

- Chafarinas Islands

Chafarinas Islands is a Spanish archipelago in the Mediterranean Sea, located off the coast of North Africa which is 4 km away (35 º 11 'N 2º 26' W) and consists of three main islands: Isla del Congreso, Isla de Isabel II and Isla del Rey. They are protected as a National Reserve. The total land area is 52.5 ha, the terrain is rugged and rocky and the highest point is in the Cerro Nido de las Águilas, on the Isla del Congreso, with 137 m above sea level. Beaches are very scarce on the coast of the islands.

- Peñon de Alhucemas

The Peñon de Alhucemas is an islet located in the Mediterranean Sea, 2 km north of the African coast and in the bay of the same name. It integrates, along with two uninhabited islets, the Isla de Tierra and Isla del Mar, the Alhucemas Islands. It measures about 170 meters long by 86 meters wide, has a surface area of approximately 0.15 km^{2} and has a maximum altitude of 15 meters.

- Peñon de Vélez de la Gomera

The Peñon de Vélez de la Gomera is a peninsula (originally an island) located in North Africa, 126 km west of Melilla and 117 km southeast of Ceuta joined to the mainland by a narrow strip of sand. It has an area of approximately 19 000 m^{2} and a maximum altitude of 87 m above sea level.

== Influence of the relief in the history of Spain ==
The rugged and complex terrain of Spain has directly influenced the history of this country, and the battles and wars that have been fought there. It must be taken into account that, until a little over two hundred years ago, access to many parts of the Iberian Peninsula was complicated because it was necessary to overcome mountain ranges. For example, to access the Meseta Central (where Madrid and Toledo are located) from Europe, it is necessary to cross the Pyrenees and the Iberian system. The ancient Romans, the Visigoths, the Arabs and later the Christians had difficulties in conquering territories because the inhabitants of mountainous areas knew the orography of their land well, while the invaders did not. The conquest of the Canary Islands was also delayed for this reason. In the flat areas, especially in the Meseta Central, the castles were built on top of the hills to be able to see the enemy in time. Historians and writers have compared the Meseta Central to a castle, the surrounding mountain ranges being its walls. Therefore, Spain has never been an easy country to conquer due, in part, to its terrain. On the other hand, this geography was one of the reasons why Spain did not have a sufficiently extensive railroad network until technologies allowed the construction of mountain routes. This lack of modern means of transport meant a delay in the development of the Industrial Revolution.

== See also ==
- Terrain
- Orography
- Geography of Spain
- Climate of Spain
- List of mountains in Spain
- List of extreme points of Spain

== Bibliography ==
- Enríquez, María Fernanda (1992). Atlas de España (in Spanish). Edita Diario El País. ISBN 84-86459-39-7.
- Muñoz-Delgado, María Concepción (2003). Geografía, Bachillerato (in Spanish). Editorial Anaya. ISBN 84-667-2187-8.
- Sancho, Julio. Colección de mapas, Geografía (in Spanish). Editorial Oxford Educación. ISBN 84-8104-908-5.
