= Cape Sant Antoni, Spain =

Cape in Alicante, Spain

Coordinates: 38.802°N 0.198°E

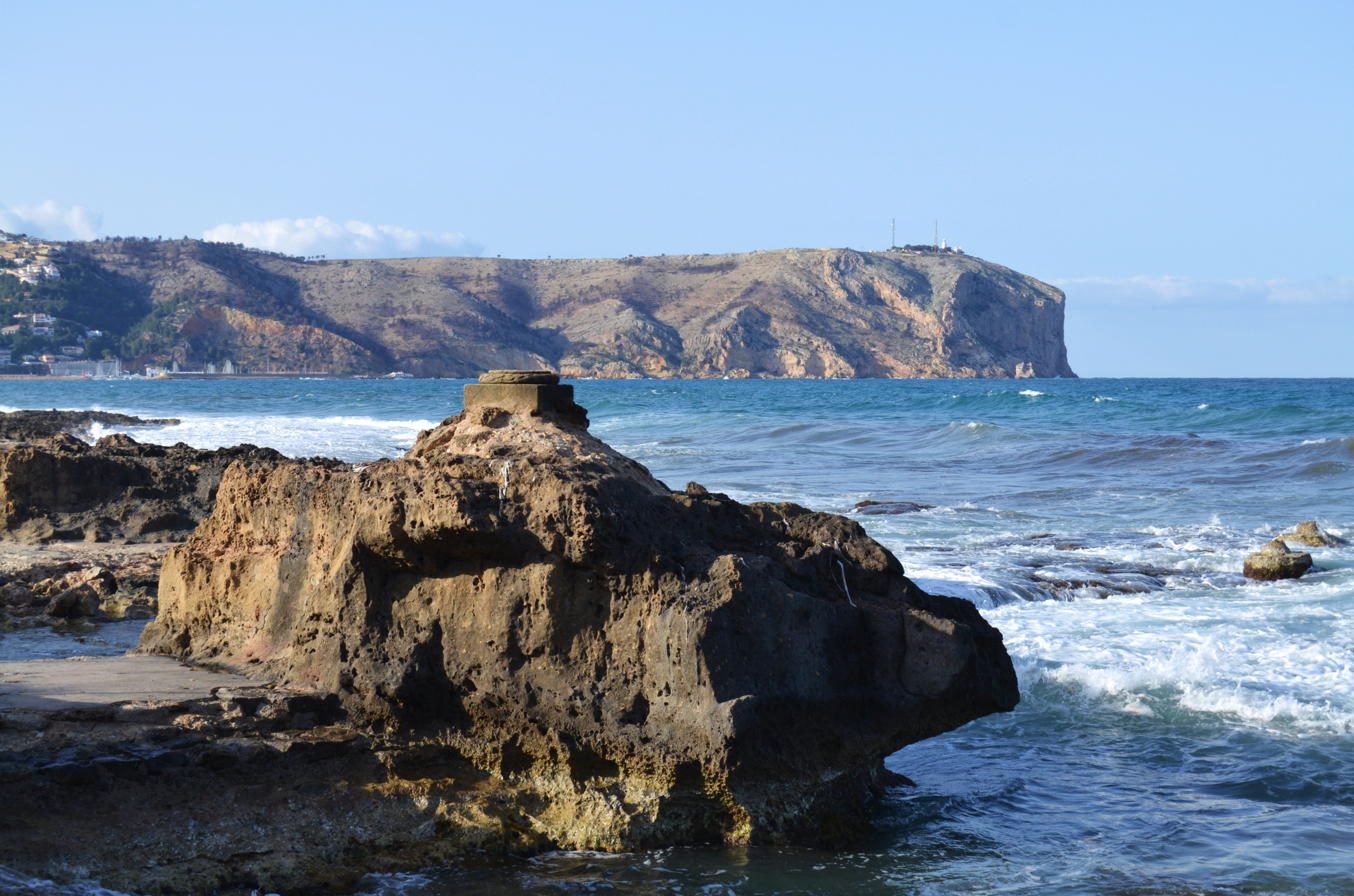
Cape Sant Antoni

Cape Sant Antoni Spanish: Cabo San Antonio); (Valencian: Cap de Sant Antoni is a cape in the town of Jávea, on the north coast of the province of Alicante in the Valencian Community, southeastern Spain. It is located north of the town proper, south of Dénia, and forms part of the southern edge of the Gulf of Valencia, just before it ends at the more southerly Cap de la Nau. It is backed by the Montgó Mountain, of which it is actually an extension, geologically speaking, and ends in 170-meter-high cliffs. It is included in the Costa Blanca.

It is part of the Montgó Natural Park, while the surrounding waters are part of the Cape Sant Antoni Marine Reserve, and there are two plant micro-reserves on land, one at the north cliff face, and the other on a nearby isle. At its tip is an out-of-use lighthouse first operated in 1855, built in an area with several small buildings including a former lookout tower that formed the basis for the lighthouse. Formerly there was also a small 14th-century chapel or hermitage dedicated to Sant Antoni. As of 2020, the lighthouse is soon to be converted into an interpretation center (information center) for the Marine Reserve.

It is the mainland point closest to the island of Ibiza, which can be seen on a clear day, and actually reached by ferry from nearby Dénia.

Curious fact: from here you have a nearly clear shot by boat across the Mediterranean all the way to Beirut, Lebanon, for instance.

== In literature ==
It has been sung by such authors as Baltasar Porcel, in his Arran de Mar (1967, literary travel book) and Vicent Blasco Ibáñez, in his novel Flor de Mayo (1895).

== See also ==
- Cap de la Nau
- Montgó Massif
- Xàbia
- Baetic System
