= Cave of the Barranc del Migdia =

Cave and archaeological site in Spain

- location in Spain
- 38°47′20″N 0°9′57.8″E
- Location: Xabia

The cave of the Barranc (Ravine) del Migdia was discovered in 1989 in Xabia (Spain). At an altitude of around 375 metres on the sunny side of the Montgó, the cave is situated at the head of the ravine after which it is named. The site preserves an important group of schematic rock paintings, as well as multiple graves from the Calcolithic or copper age.

== Excavation ==
In 2009 archaeological excavations were begun in the central hall of the cave. This space appears to have been a prehistoric funeral chamber as the remains of eight individuals have been recovered – women, men and children - after three excavation campaigns. These remains were deposited in “packets” or bundles of bones, which indicates that they are” secondary” burials, i.e. the remains of the individuals buried in the cave had been transferred, already as skeletons, from another place.

The dead were buried with objects later excavated in the burial site, the purpose of which was to assist the deceased in the passage to another life. To date, flint arrow heads, hand made ceramic vessels, an adze of polished stone and a copper awl have been found. Radiocarbon dating of the bones of some of the burials dates the remains to 4,683 years ago, in the late Neolithic times.

The groups of humans who used the cave as a burial place and a site for schematic rock paintings belonged to communities that had settled in the valley. They lived in small hamlets dedicating themselves to agriculture and livestock farming, although hunting was also an important activity.

== Significance ==
The cave of the Barranc del Migdia, visible from all over the valley of Xàbia, would have been easily identifiable for these peoples, a landmark of their connection to a site where the remains of their ancestors had rested for generations. It is a unique place, as it combines artistic representations of some of their concerns about life and religion, with a burial chamber which conveys their beliefs about death.

Thousands of years later, firstly in Roman times and later at the end of the Moorish period, the cave served as a refuge and hiding place. A small treasure of Almohadian coins was hidden here. Some ten coins are conserved by the Soler Blasco Archeological Museum in Javea.

== Ongoing investigation ==
The investigations in this site - studies of physical anthropology, DNA, stone age diet, vegetation environment, C14 radiocarbon dating, etc. – have brought to light unknown aspects about these ancient settlers. This archeological investigation project directed by the Cirne Foundation brings Xàbia and the Montgò into the field of modern European scientific investigation. They are currently awaiting the results of the DNA studies being conducted in the University of Mainz in Germany, which will specify the type of burial, whether it was a vault for families or for important people of the time.
