= Peninsular Spain =

Part of Spain in Iberia

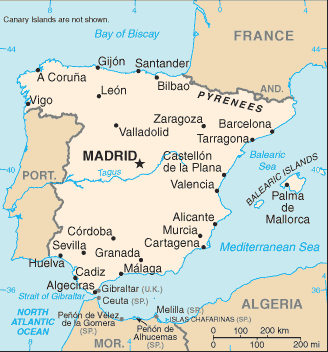
A map of peninsular Spain

Peninsular Spain (Spanish: España peninsular) is the part of the territory of Spain located within the Iberian Peninsula, excluding other parts of Spain: the Canary Islands, the Balearic Islands, Ceuta, Melilla, and several islets and crags off the coast of Africa known collectively as plazas de soberanía (places of sovereignty). In Spain, it is mostly known simply as la Península. It has land frontiers with France and Andorra to the north, Portugal to the west, and the British overseas territory of Gibraltar to the south.

== Characteristics ==
Peninsular Spain has an area of 492,175 km^{2}. In 2013, the population was 43,731,572. It contains 15 of the autonomous communities of Spain.

Occupying the central part of Spain, it possesses much greater resources and better interior and exterior communications than other parts of the country. To redress this imbalance, Spanish residents outside the peninsula receive a state subsidy for transport to and from the peninsula.

These are the municipalities with the highest population:

1. Madrid 3,207,247
2. Barcelona 1,611,822
3. Valencia 792,303
4. Seville 700,169
5. Zaragoza 682,004
6. Málaga 568,479
7. Murcia 438,246
8. Bilbao 349,356
9. Alicante 335,052
10. Córdoba 328,704

== See also ==
- País Vasco peninsular, the portion of the historic Basque Country located in peninsular Spain
- Peninsulares, inhabitants of Spanish colonies born in peninsular Spain
- Peninsular Spanish
- Topographical relief of Spain
