= Gulf of Almería =

Bight on the southeastern Iberian Peninsula

Coordinates: 36°46′N 2°25′W

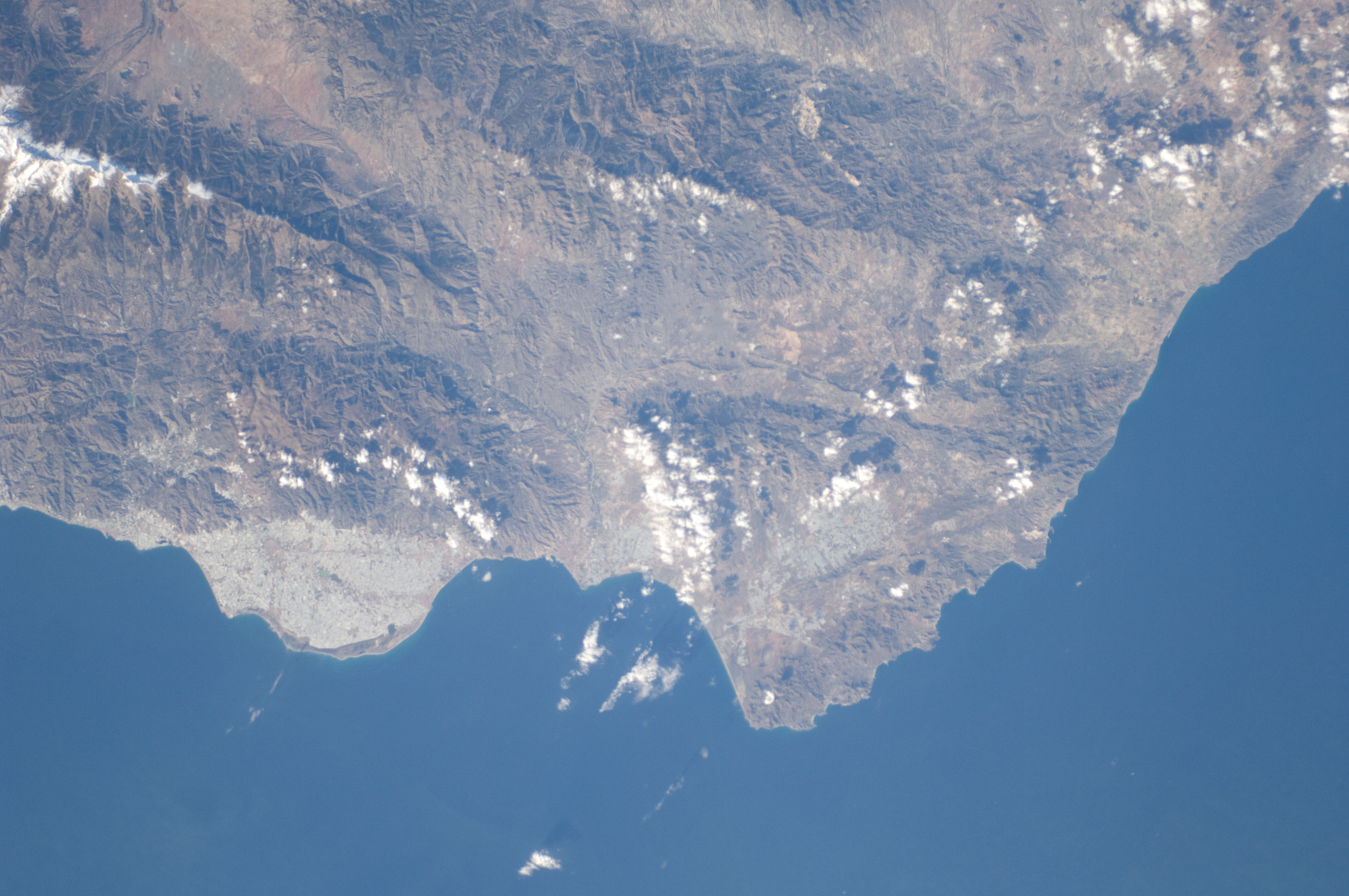
Satellite picture of the Mediterranean shoreline taken during ISS's Expedition 30 featuring the Gulf of the Almería at the bottom

The Gulf of Almería (Spanish: Golfo de Almería) is a bight of the Mediterranean Sea, in the southeastern end of the Iberian Peninsula.

It lies between Punta Sabinar and Cabo de Gata. It is shaped as a semicircle opened to the south with a protrusion in its center featuring the mouth of the Andarax river. Scholars placing ancient Urci in Pechina identify the Sinus Urcitanus cited by Pomponius Mela with the Gulf of Almería.
