= Montgó Massif =

Mountain in Spain

Montgó
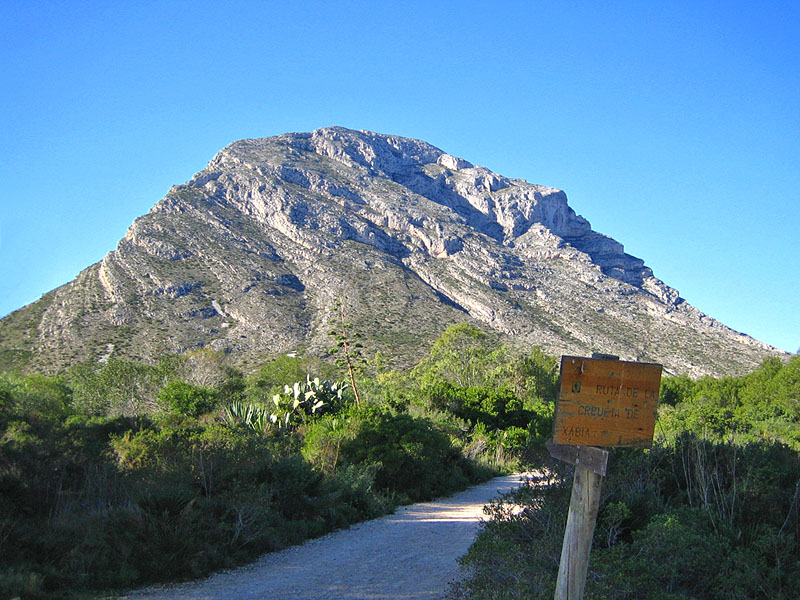
- Montgó massif seen from the plain of San Antonio, Xàbia

Highest point
- Coordinates: 38°48′30″N 0°7′0″E

Geography
- Location within Spain
- Location: Marina Alta, Valencian Community
- Parent range: Prebaetic System, Eastern zone

Geology
- Mountain type: Limestone

Climbing
- Easiest route: First drive, then hike from Xàbia or from Dénia

Montgó (Valencian pronunciation: [moŋˈɡo]) is a mountain in Alicante Province, Spain, which rises to 753 metres (2,470 ft). It is the last spur on the Cordillera Prebética Mountain Range and is located in the Marina Alta region in the north of Alicante between the towns of Dénia and Xàbia. The mountain rises dramatically from the valley floors surrounding it and dominates the skyline for miles around. Its craggy cliffs are home to some of the most unusual flora and fauna in Spain. The mountain is renowned for its rock formations, cliffs, caves and natural harbours. From the Xàbia side Montgó is often said to resemble the head and trunk of an elephant. The mountain can be easily reached by highway CV-736 which links Denia with Xàbia, both of which are accessible via the AP-7 motorway or the N-332 national highway.

A regional folktale details that Dénia and Xàbia fought over the Montgó so much that one fell on their face and the other on their butt, giving the nicknames of people from these regions.

== Montgó Nature Reserve ==
The Montgó Nature Reserve encompasses 2150 hectares (5312 acres) around the mountain. It includes a coastal section that covers over 3 kilometres (1.9 mi). The Reserve contains important archaeological finds such as cave paintings, Phoenician amphoras and the remains of Iberian settlements. Because of its extraordinary wealth of flora, fauna and ecosystems the park was declared an officially protected nature reserve in 1987. The reserve runs almost parallel to the coastline, joining the coastal area via a flat area known as ‘les Planes’ which ends at Cap de San Antoni.

== Formation of the Montgó ==
The mountain was formed during the Cretaceous period, some 70 million years ago, when plate tectonic processes forced the African and European continental plates upwards, creating spectacular mountainous landscapes such as that of the Montgó. Over the next few million years, strong erosion and rock slides sculpted it to the shape it has today.

The geological composition of this Nature Reserve is characterized by Cretaceous materials. On the lower parts, marl and marlaceous lime abound, while the escarpments are formed by compact limestone.

== Flora and fauna ==
=== Flora ===
The geology and climate of the Montgó has fostered more than 650 species of flora. The primitive Mediterranean oak, which once dominated the mountain before over-exploitation by man, is still present, as is Mount Atlas Pistachio, rosemary, white hellebore, rock lavender, marine juniper and cistus.

In the higher more humid areas there are a number of endemic plants such as the Hippocrepis Valentina and the Valencian rock violet, as well as the blue Mediterranean fan palm (usually seen in the plains), the only palm species to grow wild in Europe. In addition, the Carduncellus Dianius or ‘Hierba Santa’ as it is known in Spanish, is unique and only found here and in Ibiza.

The Montgó flora also includes Kermes oak groves dotted with mastic trees and rhamnnus alaternus, as well as the Mediterranean scrub. On the summit there is red lavender and Kermes oak. These take over from the communities of holm oak which dominate the more protected areas with deeper soil.

On the cliffs of the Cap de Sant Antoni, the vegetation is characterised by plants adapted to growing in the fissures, cracks and shelves of the cliff, and able to withstand contact with salt water. In the areas closest to the sea, Marine Fennel and the everlasting flower, Helichrysum decumbens, can be found. As one moves away from the sea and the salinity decreases the Valencian rock violet appears as well as Cave Scabius on the steeper slopes. On more level ground, endemic plants can be found (the town of Denia takes its name from the cult to the Roman goddess Diana) such as the Valencian rock violet and also pitiusic vegetation (in reference to the nearby archipelago Pitiusas) such as rock thistle and valerian can be found.

On the plain, as on the hillside, lavender and Kermes oak grow mingled with repopulated aleppo or carrasco pine and vegetation typical of unirrigated land. Shady cliffs, with their increased humidity level, isolation and inaccessibility encourage the growth of endemic plants such as Valencian rock violet, Cave Scabius, Sanguisorba ancistroides, and Sarcocapnos saetabensis. On wider shelves, a community of Black Sabina and Chamaerops humilis has developed. In areas exposed to the sun, various communities of species adapted to high temperatures and scarce humidity levels are located, such as Chaenorrhinum crassifolium and Teucrium hifacense.

=== Fauna ===
The marine bird life comprises the yellow-footed gull (Larus cachinnans), Sandwich tern (Sterna sandvicensis) and Audouin's gull (Larus audouinii), among other species. The peregrine falcon and the Eurasian eagle owl live on the Montgó as well as eagles, ravens, seagulls and an abundance of other migratory birds. In the higher areas the patiamarilla gull nests and Audouin's gull winters along with Bonelli's eagle.

In total there are eight species of birds of prey in the Montgó Natural Park which have been documented to be breeding. Four of these species are nocturnal (Eurasian eagle owl, Eurasian scops owl, tawny owl and the little owl) and the other four diurnal (goshawk, peregrine falcon, common kestrel and Eurasian sparrowhawk). They feed on the many European rabbits, red foxes, toads, snakes, dormice, brown rats, European badgers, common genets, weasels and bats which share their mountain home. Although there is no concrete evidence as yet, it is probable that common buzzards, short-toed eagles and the Eleanora's falcon also reproduce in the Montgó park.

Due to shortages of places to collect water, amphibians are rare, although the common toad and the natterjack toad are still found. Reptiles are more frequent, such as the viviparous lizard, the ocellated lizard, the horseshoe whip snake, and, most exotically, Bedriaga's skink. As regards invertebrate species, there are a great number of gastropods and insects.

== Human inhabitants ==
The first evidence of human presence on Montgó dates to the Paleolithic period some 30,000 years ago. During this period, small nomadic groups occupied the caves and hills that faced the sea in the Cap de San antoni. The communities lived a hunter-gatherer way of life, and were able to survive thanks to rich fishing grounds, plentiful supply of animals and mild temperatures. Evidence of human presence in past millennia can be seen in the famous paintings in Migdia cave. Elsewhere on the mountain Stone-Age hand-axes and flints have been found along with Roman pottery and Muslim ceramics.

There are a few caves in the massif. The most prominent is the Cova de l'Aigua, a small cave that was used in the Iberian age in the 4th and 5th centuries as a place of worship and later as a water deposit in the 18th century. In the entrance there's a Roman inscription dated year 238 carved by a legionary stationed there. The cave is accessible from the Dénia side.

At the beginning of the 10th century the moorish Caliph, Abd ur Rahman the Third, made a special trip from Cordoba to collect over a hundred medicinal herbs from the slopes of Montgó.

At the end of the 19th century, a high demand for raisins led to the cultivation of the Moscatel grape on its slopes. Today, these areas have been largely abandoned due to difficulty in accessibility and non-profitability. Yet some vines, which produce the sweet grape variety, mostly the Mistela of the Marina Alta, as well as some citrus products, are still grown.

== Climatic conditions ==
Clouds are often seen forming around the peak of Montgó even when the sky is clear elsewhere. This is caused by Orographic lift. Humid air from the Mediterranean is forced up towards the summit of the Montgó, then condenses and falls as rain. Despite its dry and austere appearance, rain is common on the mountain, with peak precipitation occurring between September and November. However, during the summer there is often a long period of drought.

== Climbing the Montgó ==
It is possible to climb to the top of Montgó from all sides. The excursion leads through numerous eco-systems: stony terrain, croplands, pine forests and scrub land. The ascent takes about four hours. At the summit of Montgó one will find the remains of the Casa de Biot, an Iberian settlement of the eighth century B.C. From the summit there are magnificent views of the coast and the sea and on a clear day, Ibiza can be seen.

== Legislation protecting the Montgó ==
Decree 25/87, issued on 16 March 1987 by the Consell of the Generalitat Valenciana, declared the Montgó a Natural Park. This decree has since been modified by Ordinance 110/92. Law 5/88, issued on 24 June 1988 by the Generalitat Valenciana, protects the nature reserves of the Province of Valencia.

== See also ==
- Mountains of the Valencian Community
