= Cap de la Nau =

Headland in Spain

Coordinates: 38°44′19″N 0°13′00″E

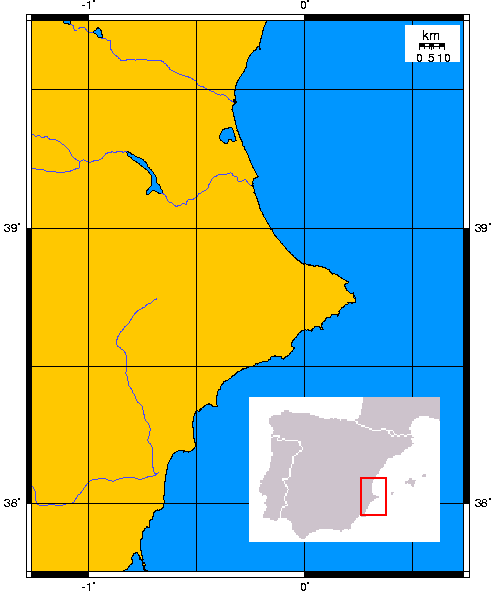
Location of Cap de la Nau on the Gulf of Valencia, Mediterranean Sea.

The Cap de la Nau (Valencian: [ˈkab de la ˈnaw]) or Cabo de la Nao (Spanish: [ˈkaβo ðe la ˈnao]), literally Cape of the Ship, is a headland located in central-eastern coastal Spain on the Gulf of Valencia, Mediterranean Sea. In English, it is also known as Cape Nao.

== Geography ==
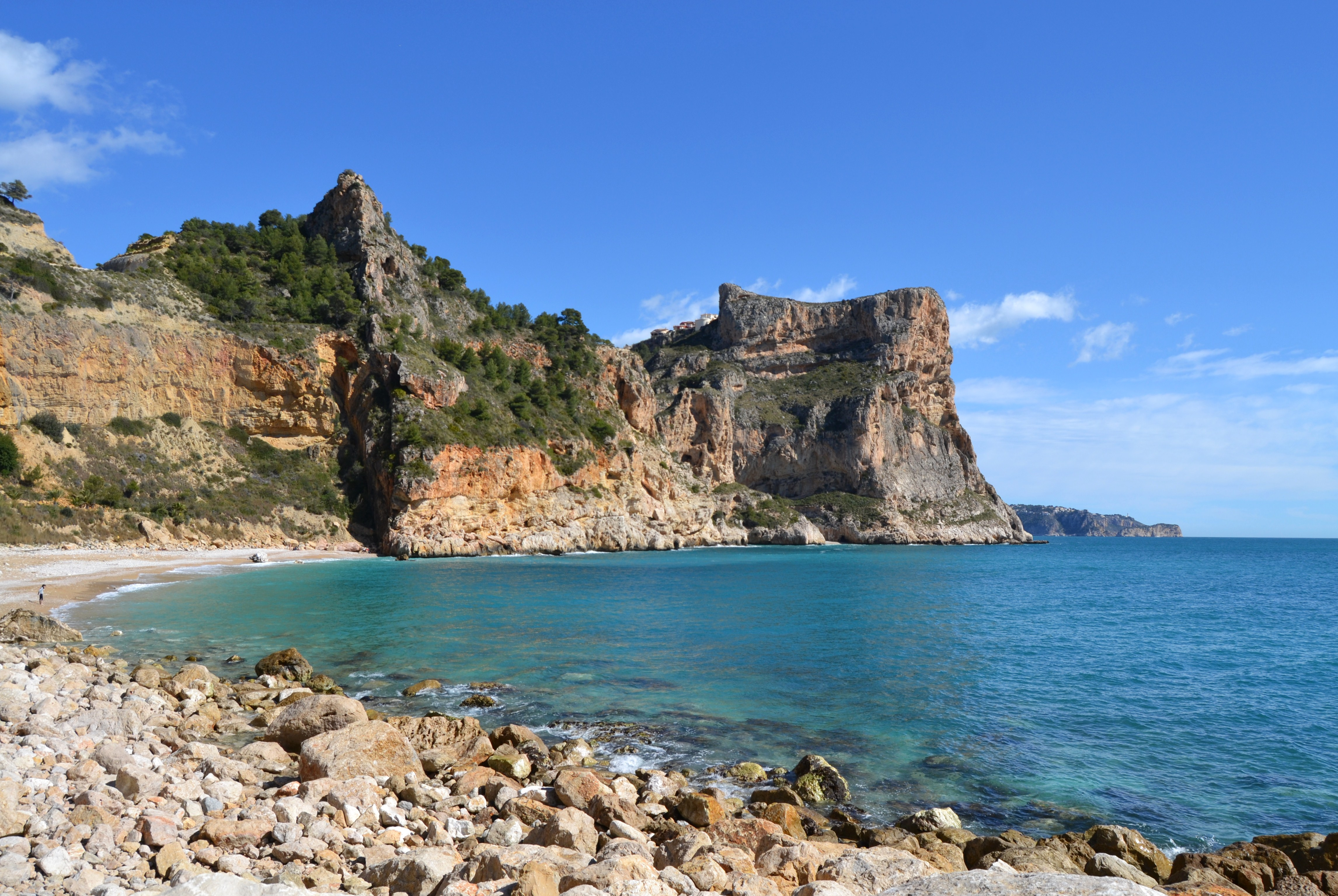
Benitatxell Cliff, Cap de la Nau, near Cumbre del Sol

Cap de la Nau is in the municipality of Xàbia, within the Mediterranean province of Alicante, in the comarca of Marina Alta, and is the easternmost point of the Valencian Community. It marks the southern limit of the Gulf of Valencia, and points towards the nearby island of Formentera in the Balearic Islands.

The cape is rocky, steep and mostly composed of limestone. Beneath the headland there is a large cave, known as Cova dels Orgues (or Cueva de los Órganos in Spanish) that can only be approached from the sea.

Lighthouse

Atop the headland, at an elevation of 120 metres (390 ft), stands the Cap de la Nau lighthouse, providing an important aid to navigation.

== See also ==
- Cap de Sant Antoni
