= Xàbia =

Xàbia Jávea
- Town and municipality
- Xàbia / Jávea (official)
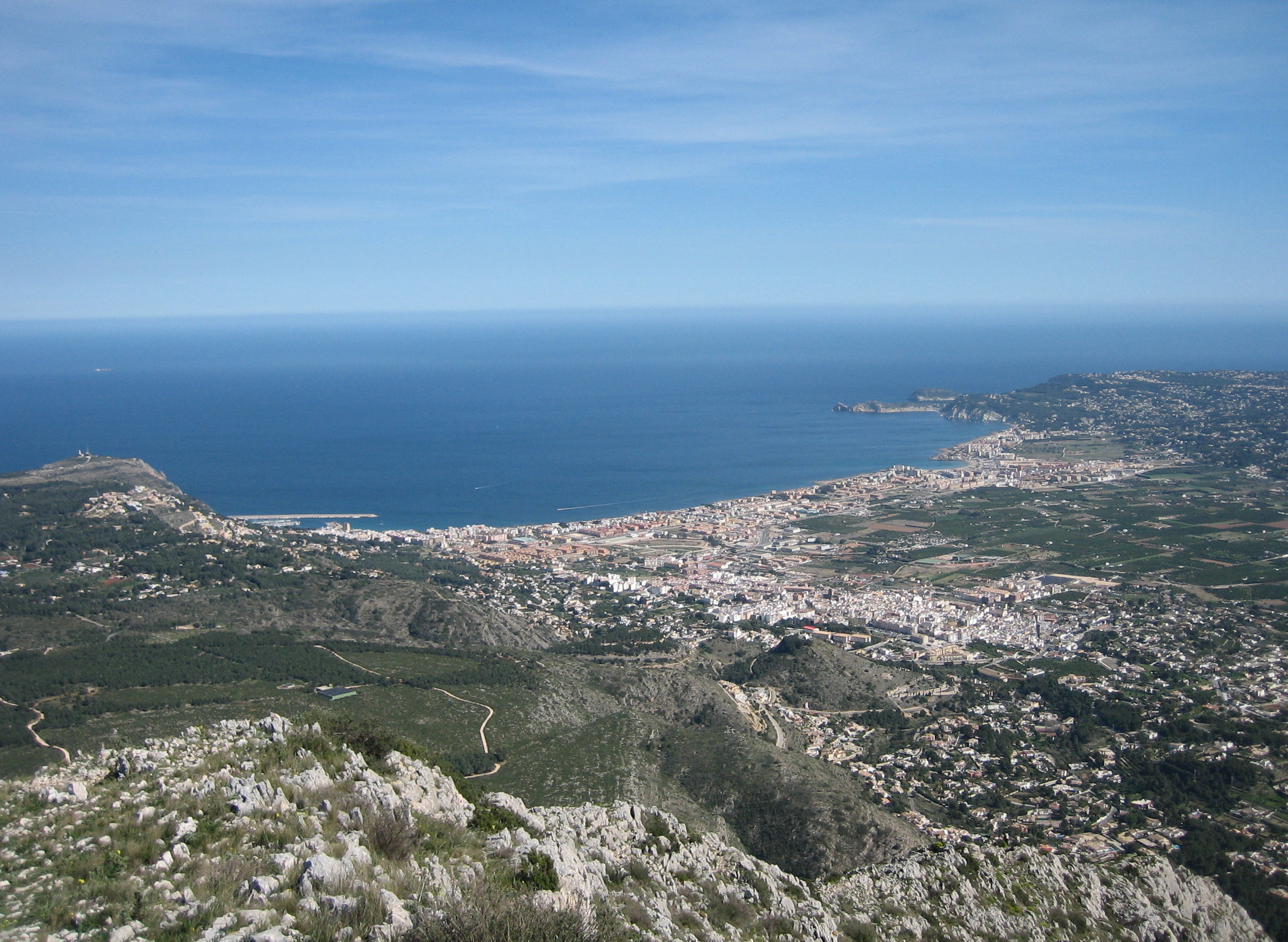
- View of Xàbia from Montgó massif

- Coat of arms

- Location in the Province of Alicante Xàbia (Valencian Community) Xàbia (Spain)
- Coordinates: 38°47′21″N 0°9′47″E
- Country: Spain
- Autonomous community: Valencian Community
- Province: Alicante
- Comarca: Marina Alta
- Judicial district: Dénia

Government
  - Alcaldessa (Mayoress): Rosa Cardona (PP)

Area
  - Total: 68.59 km^{2} (26.48 sq mi)
- Elevation: 12 m (39 ft)

Population (2025-01-01)
  - Total: 30,642
  - Density: 446.7/km^{2} (1,157/sq mi)
- Demonyms: • xabienc, -a (Val.) • javiense (Sp.)
- Official language(s): Valencian; Spanish
- Linguistic area: Valencian
- Time zone: UTC+1 (CET)
  - Summer (DST): UTC+2 (CEST)
- Postal code: 03730, 03737–03739
- Website: Official website

Xàbia, (Note: Pronunciation of Xàbia: Valencian: [ˈʃabia]) in Valencian, or Jávea, (Note: Pronunciation of Jávea: Spanish: [ˈxaβea]) in Spanish (officially: Xàbia / Jávea), is a coastal town and municipality in the comarca of Marina Alta, in the province of Alicante, Valencia, Spain, by the Mediterranean Sea. Situated on the side of the Montgó Massif, behind a wide bay and sheltered between two rocky headlands, the town has become a very popular small seaside resort and market town. Half of its resident population and over two thirds of its annual visitors are foreigners.

== History ==
The area was first inhabited soon after the end of the last Ice Age, some 30,000 years ago, by hunter-gatherers who used the Foradada cave on the north face of the Cape of San Antonio. Caves on the Montgó mountain contain Neolithic and Chalcolithic remains, and there is an important Bronze Age settlement on Cap Prim The indigenous Iron Age culture was that of the Iberians, who interacted with both Greek and Phoenician traders and settlers. This is reflected in the design of amphoras and the gold and silver jewellery of the Lluca treasure. Iberian culture gradually gave way to Roman dominance. Archaeological evidence from a Roman agricultural settlement in La Barraquera reveals a long occupation from the 1st century BCE until the end of the 6th century AD. The economy seems to have been based on agriculture (vines for wine, olive oil and cereals) with some fishing and perhaps the extraction of salt from the Saladar.

According to legend, Christian Visigoth monks came to Xàbia in the 6th century AD and founded the monastery of Sant Martí, which likely gave its name to the cape in the area named Cap San Martí. Hermenegild, son of the Visigoth king Leovigild of Toledo, sought refuge in the Monastery after angering his father by marrying a Christian girl. When his father's troops arrived to arrest him all but one monk fled to Portichol; Hermenegild and the old monk were killed. Several people with Visigoth names still live in the area. There is no archaeological evidence for the existence of the monastery of San Martí.

There is little left of the Moors and their culture, other than some inscribed gravestones and ceramics. They had controlled the area from about 714 AD until they (the Moriscos) were finally expelled from the Alicante region in 1609. The hermitage of Popol dates to the 14th century.

In the 16th and 17th centuries pirate raids were prevalent, so a wall was built around the town for protection. The wall was later torn down, and today a replica exists in its place in certain sections.

=== Archaeology ===
In September 2021, archaeologists announced the discovery of trove of 1,500-year-old gold coins from the Roman Empire. A hoard of 50 coins with inscriptions was almost well-preserved and easily readable. According to researchers, Roman Emperors' pictures included Valentinian I (three coins), Valentinian II (seven coins), Theodosius I (15 coins), Arcadius (17 coins), Honorius (10 coins) and an unidentified coin. The coins will be restored and then exhibited at the Soler Blasco Archaeological and Ethnographic Museum in Xàbia.

== Geography ==
Xàbia is situated in the north of the Alicante province, on the easternmost point of the Mediterranean coast. The island of Ibiza lies some 90 kilometres (56 mi) to the east, and it can be seen on clear days. Flat, fertile agricultural land stretches for a considerable distance inland, criss-crossed by small streams and used primarily for growing citrus and olive trees. The coastline of Xàbia features four capes; Cap de San Antoni, Cap de la Nau (the largest), Cap Negre and Cap Martí.

The Montgó Massif, which shelters Xàbia, is the highest summit of the region standing at a height of over 750m. The Parque natural del Macizo del Montgó was declared in 1987, stretching across the area of La Plana to the Cape San Antonio located nearby.

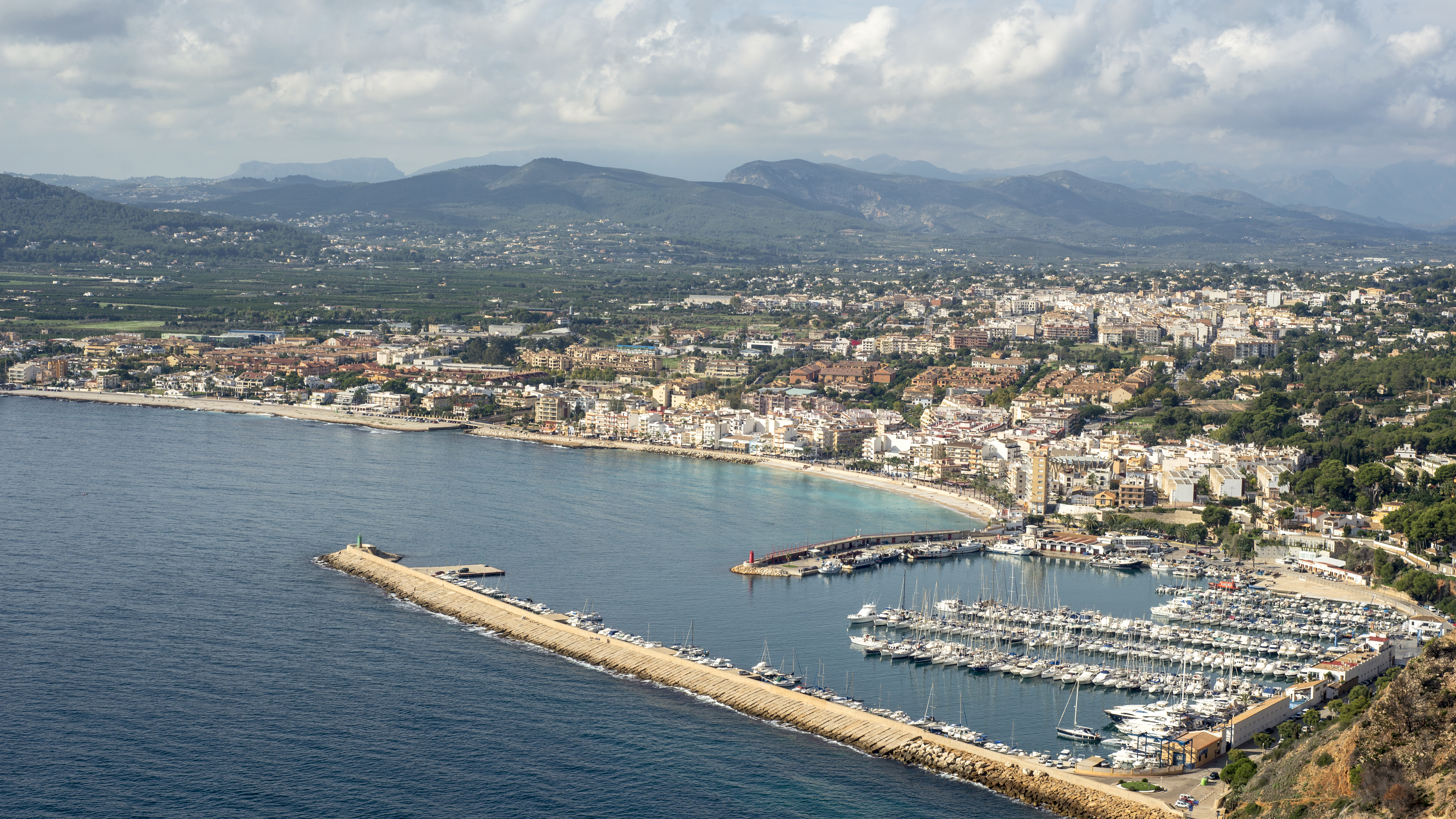
Xàbia from Cap de Sant Antoni

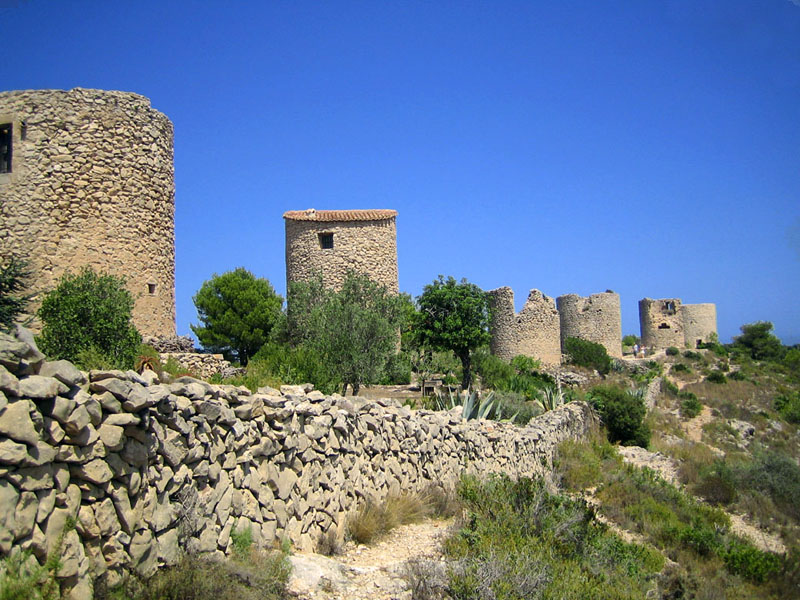
Cap de Sant Antoni windmills

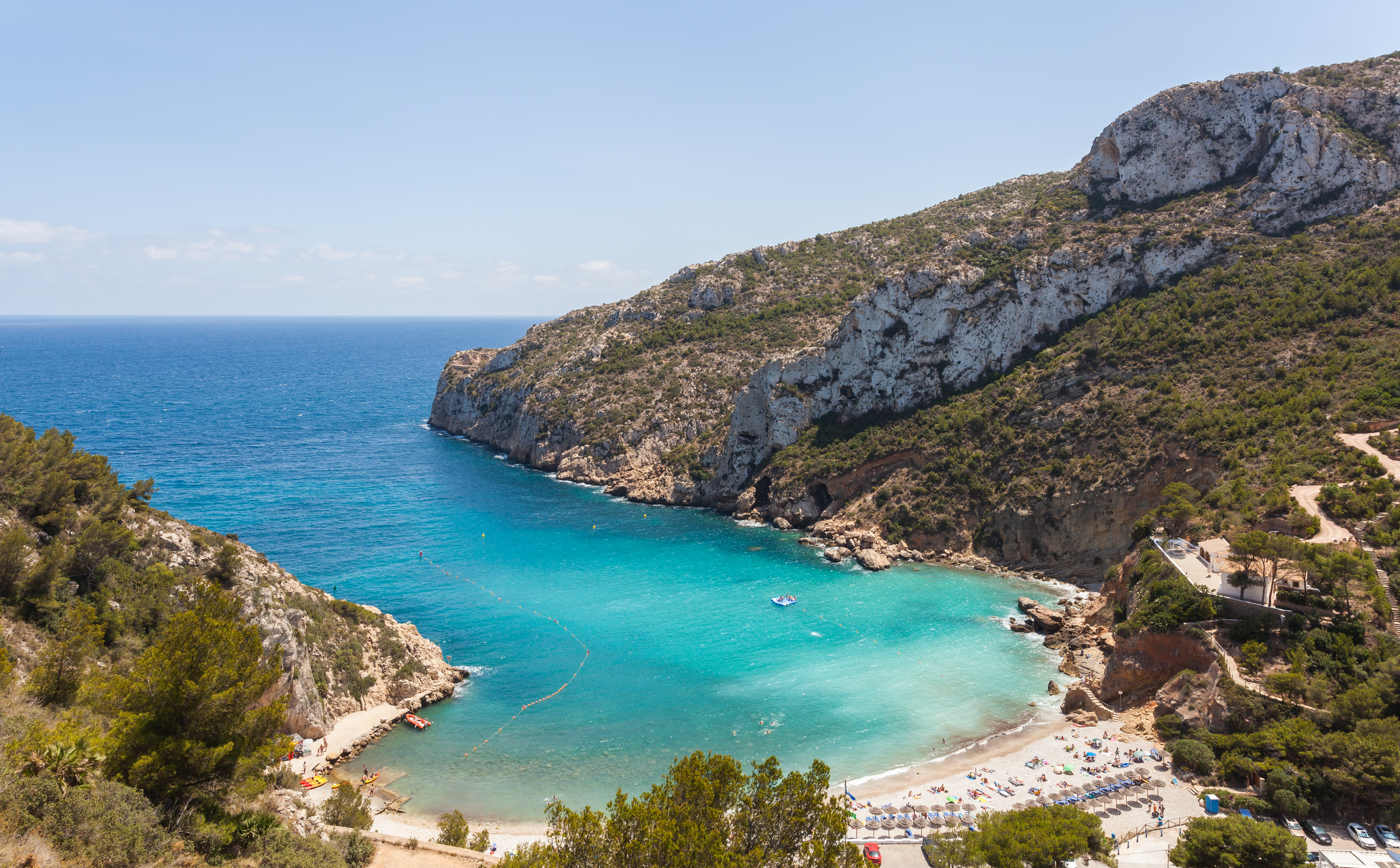
Granadella beach

== Transport ==
The port has a gravel beach and marina, known as Duanes de la Mar. Whilst the history of the harbour stretches back to the 15th century, the first jetty was built in 1871 and it became an important gateway for the export of raisins. The raisin trade collapsed at the end of the 19th century, and the settlement became only a fishing harbour. The modern harbour was built in the 1950s and 1960s. The nautical club has been in the central area of the harbour since 1963. The landmark is the church of Mare de Déu de Loreto, built in 1967 in the shape of an oval boat keel, to resemble a fishing vessel bursting through the waves.

== Notable people ==
- David Ferrer (born 1982), tennis player.
- Sergio Hernández (born 1983), racing car driver.
- Tomàs Morató i Bernabéu (1887–1965), politician.
- Adrián Ortolá (born 1993), footballer.
- Xavi Torres (born 1986), footballer.
- Abu Ishaq al-Shatibi (born 1320), islamic scholar
