= Gulf of Valencia =

Coordinates: 39°30′N 00°00′E

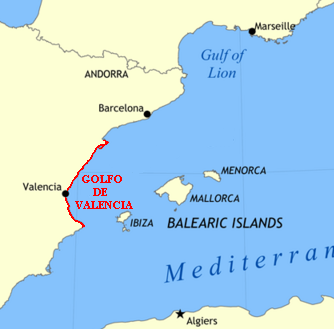
Gulf of Valencia location in the Western Mediterranean, in this map the northern limit is drawn at the Ebro delta

The Gulf of Valencia (Valencian: Golf de València, Spanish: Golfo de Valencia), is a gulf or inlet of the western Mediterranean Sea, on the eastern coast of Spain. Its limits are the Cap de la Nau headland in the south, while the northern limit is diffuse: for some it is the Cape of Vinaròs; and for others it is the Ebre Delta. When the Cape of Vinaròs is used the Gulf of Valencia's coast is entirely within the Valencian Community. When the Ebre Delta is used its northern coast is within southern Catalonia.

The tiny Columbretes islets are located in the gulf. The Gulf of Valencia is bisected by the Prime Meridian.

== Geography ==
The coast along the Gulf of Valencia is typically a sandy plain with beaches. The distinctive shoreline features in this region are the coastal marshes, with the Albufera estuary an example. It is a Ramsar Convention listed wetland of importance.

The gulf area is among the finest examples of the Mediterranean climate in Spain. The coast along the Gulf of Valencia is densely populated, with one of the highest population densities in Spain.

=== Uses ===
Adjacent are low and fertile lands, with rice and especially citrus trees producing oranges and lemons, as the dominant crops.

In May 2011 the energy firm Cairn Energy obtained licenses to explore for oil and operate drilling rigs and oil platforms in 4,000 square kilometres (990,000 acres) in the Gulf of Valencia from the Spanish government. There are environmental concerns about offshore drilling here.

== See also ==
- Valencian Community
- Balearic Islands
