= 2014 Ceuta border incident =

Migrant disaster in Ceuta, Spain

- Part of Morocco–Spain relations
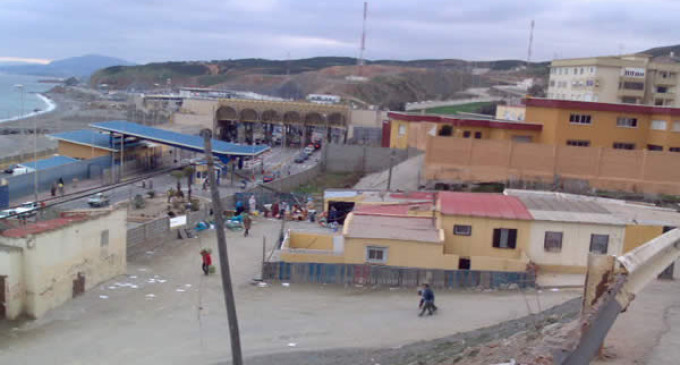
- Morocco-Spain border in Tarajal, Ceuta
- Date: 6 February 2014
- Location: El Tarajal breakwater crossing between Morocco and Spain, Ceuta
- Deaths: 15

On 6 February 2014, between 200 and 300 migrants attempted to cross into Spain from Morocco swimming through the El Tarajal beach breakwater in Ceuta. Spanish authorities repelled them using riot gear (such as rubber bullets and smoke canisters), causing many of them to return to the sea, where 15 drowned.

The incident (also commonly referred to as the "Tarajal tragedy") caused a political crisis for the then Spanish government under Mariano Rajoy, whose Interior minister, Jorge Fernández Díaz, defended the police action and denied that the deaths were caused by the firing of weapons. A judicial investigation against 16 Civil Guard officers involved was dismissed in October 2015.

== See also ==
- 2021 Morocco–Spain border incident
- 2022 Melilla border incident
- 2026 Ceuta migrant crisis
