= 2021 Morocco–Spain border incident =

Diplomatic crisis between Spain and Morocco

- Part of the Morocco–Spain relations within the Western Sahara conflict
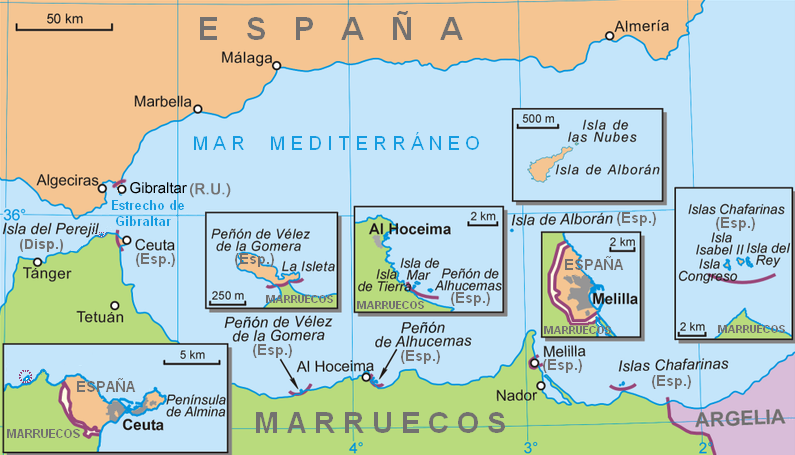
- Map of Spanish territories in North Africa
- Date: 17 May – 23 August 2021
- Location: Ceuta and Melilla
- Type: Weaponized migration and international incident
- Participants: Between 6,000–9,000 people
- Deaths: 2

A massive crossing of people along the beaches of the Morocco–Spain border in the direction of the Spanish autonomous cities of Ceuta and Melilla began on 17 May 2021. It originated due to a deterioration in diplomatic relations between the governments of Morocco and Spain, after the latter admitted the transfer of the president of the Sahrawi Arab Democratic Republic, Brahim Ghali, to a Spanish hospital in La Rioja, in April 2021. A month after the hospitalization, the Moroccan security forces located on the border in Ceuta (and to a lesser extent those in Melilla) relaxed the last control mechanisms, allowing the passage of migrants from Morocco to Ceuta, most of whom made the journey by swimming.

Approximately 8,000 illegal immigrants, of which 1,500 were minors, crossed the border into Ceuta by the breakwaters of the beaches of Benzú and El Tarajal. The Spanish government responded by moving security forces to the area and implementing a pushback mechanism. Most of the new arrivals were returned to Morocco within a few days of the incident.

Prior to the 2026 Morocco–Spain border incident, which saw a significantly higher number of migrants, this was the largest irregular entry of individuals into Spain to date.

== Background ==
Spain and Morocco have a bilateral agreement aimed at controlling the arrival of migrants to Spanish territory. The agreement entails cooperation on the part of the African country when it comes to limiting access at the border of the autonomous cities of Ceuta and Melilla; both constitute Spanish exclaves located north of Morocco, and are the only land entry point to the European Union from the African continent.

In April 2021, Brahim Ghali, the Sahrawi President and Secretary-General of the Polisario Front, was admitted for COVID-19 in a hospital in Logroño under a false identity. According to the weekly Jeune Afrique, he would have been hospitalized for digestive cancer.

The hospitalization provoked a negative reaction from the Moroccan government, which summoned the Spanish ambassador to the country to express its repudiation of the act, and even considered—according to sources close to the Moroccan government—granting political asylum to the leader of the Catalan independence movement Carles Puigdemont. For its part, the Spanish Ministry of Foreign Affairs responded by justifying Ghali's entry into Spanish territory "for strictly humanitarian reasons". As a result of this, a diplomatic crisis broke out between Madrid and Rabat.

== Developments ==
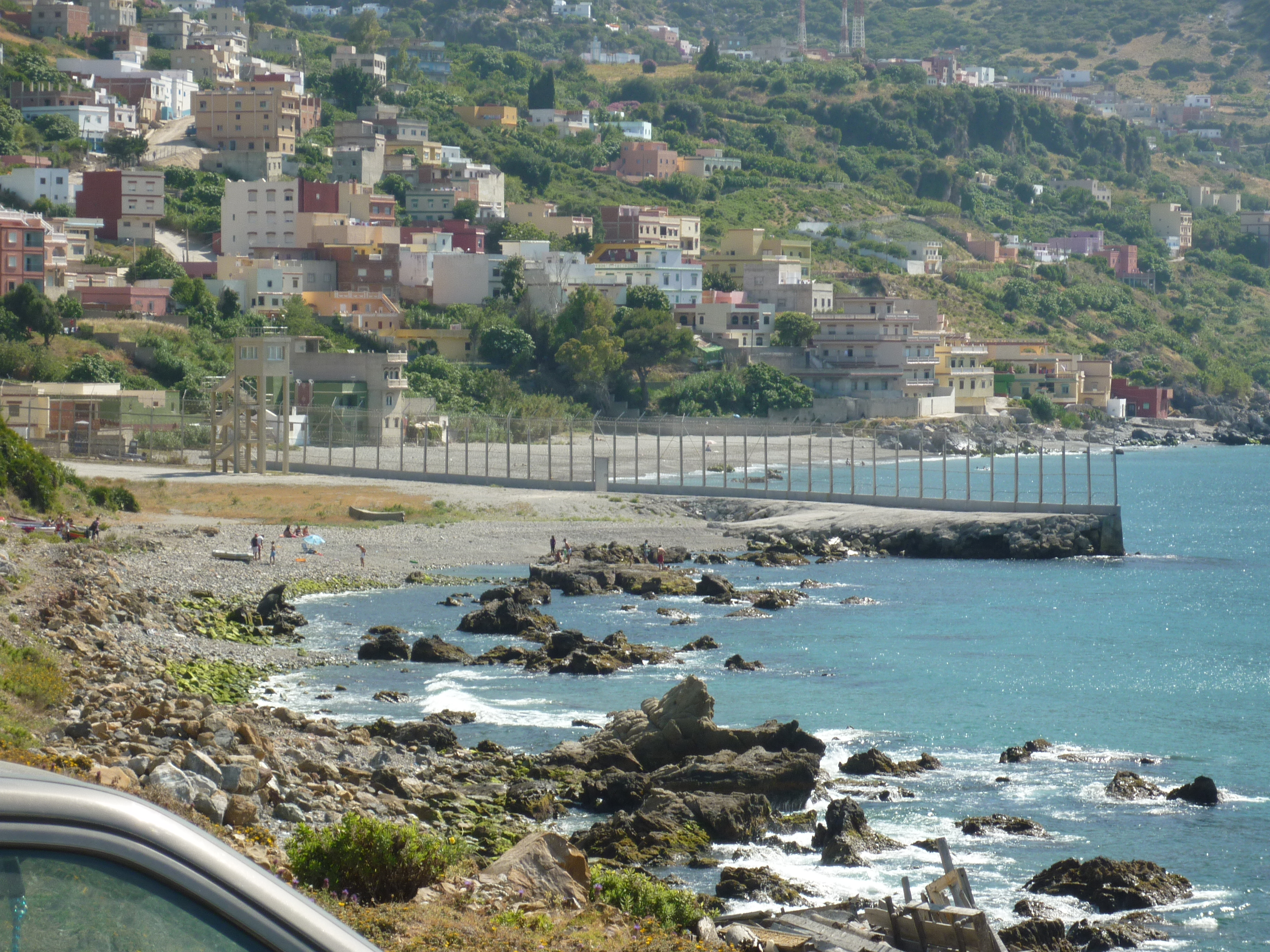
One of the fenced breakwaters, in Benzú (Ceuta), where the massive crossing took place.

On the night of 16 May 2021, a rumor broke out that the Moroccan security forces on the border between Morocco and the Spanish city of Ceuta had relaxed control and allowed the passage. According to statements by the Spanish police, they showed an "unusual passivity". According to foreign minister Nasser Bourita, the Moroccan gendarmerie had been exhausted following the celebration of Ramadan.

In the early hours of 17 May, at approximately 02:00 hours (GMT+1), a wave of migrants from Morocco began to arrive on the shores of Ceuta. Between 17 and 18 May more than 8,000 immigrants arrived in this city, among whom were approximately 1,500 minors. The vast majority of them swam across the border. The sudden arrival of immigrants caused a humanitarian crisis due to the inability of Spain to deal with the situation.

On the morning of 18 May, the President of the Spanish Government, Pedro Sánchez, announced that those who had arrived illegally would be "immediately returned" according to the bilateral agreement signed between Spain and Morocco. The Spanish Ministry of Defense also responded by moving 200 police officers to the area to support the 1,200 regular border patrol units, which would place armored vehicles along the beach to intercept new arrivals. Volunteers from the Spanish Red Cross also went to the scene to assist some immigrants suffering from hypothermia and severe fatigue after swimming across the breakwater area that marks the boundary between the two countries. The Spanish Government also enabled a fast processing system with the aim of speeding up the return process. Some migrants affirmed, through statements to Eldiario.es, that the Moroccan police had allowed them to cross the border. According to statements by some residents of Castillejos, a Moroccan city near the Ceuta border, young people from the city made the journey to the Spanish enclave encouraged by the false idea that famous soccer players were present in the Spanish city.

In the middle of the afternoon of the same day, the Spanish government announced that it had processed the expulsion of 4,000 immigrants. The minors were transferred to Piniés and to different naval bases in the area, where a quarantine was applied to them according to the regulation enabled due to the COVID-19 pandemic. Likewise, there was a greater flow of arrivals to the autonomous city of Melilla, also located in northern Morocco, where 80 immigrants crossed the double fence that separates the two nations.

=== De-escalation ===
19 May was the turning point in the border incident, after the Government of Morocco gave express orders to control the transit of immigrants from its side of the border. From the early hours of the day, after the Moroccan police reinforcement arrived at the border and the pushbacks by the Spanish security forces, the flow of arrivals had been significantly reduced, and, although these still occurred, they took place in small groups and spaced out over time. The Red Cross confirmed that the number of people served was lower than in the early morning hours of the previous days. Meanwhile, in the Moroccan cities near the border, there were clashes with the Moroccan security forces, led by groups trying to reach Spain.

On the night of 20 May, the government delegate in Melilla announced that the Armed Forces would be deployed on the border of the autonomous city with the aim of reinforcing border surveillance and security. The Spanish Government designed a distribution plan for the different autonomous communities for minors who were trapped in Ceuta. As of 23 May, there were at least 438 unaccompanied foreign minors being cared for by social services in the city.

== Reactions ==
=== Spain ===
Prime Minister Pedro Sánchez and Minister of Interior Fernando Grande-Marlaska visited Ceuta in response to the crisis. The Minister of Social Rights, Ione Belarra, warned that the devolutions "must be done with judicial surveillance." Unidas Podemos, as a government partner, asked that the actions of the army be detailed, especially in relation to the care of minors. The president of the Autonomous City of Ceuta, Juan Jesús Vivas, referred to the situation as "an invasion", and stated that the atmosphere in the city resembled "a state of exception".

The opposition Popular Party blamed the government for the crisis and demanded the "immediate devolution" of those who arrived. The leader of the Vox political party, Santiago Abascal, characterized the incident as a "Moroccan invasion" by "soldiers obeying their government," and called for action through the use of military force.

Various Spanish sources criticized Moroccan irredentism on Ceuta and Melilla.

=== Morocco ===
The incident was dubbed within Morocco as "Ghaligate". In a post on Facebook, human rights minister Mustafa Ramid stated that the incident was justified in response to Ghali's hospitalization in Spain, writing: "What did Spain expect from Morocco, which sees its neighbour hosting the head of a group that took up arms against the kingdom? [...] Morocco has the right to lean back and stretch its legs... so that Spain knows that underestimating Morocco is costly."

The conservative Istiqlal Party stated that Ghali's entry into Spanish territory "seriously tarnishes" Moroccan–Spanish bilateral relations. The Polisario Front questioned Istiqlal, reminding the Spanish government that the aforementioned party, in its relations, defends that "the territorial integrity of the Kingdom of Morocco will be incomplete without recovering all the occupied Moroccan lands, including Ceuta and Melilla".

Karima Benyaich, the Moroccan ambassador to Spain, stated in a statement about Ghali's hospitalization that "there are acts that have consequences and they have to be assumed", and described the Spanish action as "inconsistent with the spirit of friendship and good neighborly relations between the two countries." She would be called for consultation by both governments following her statement, action that is usually considered as a tense point in diplomatic relations between two nations. In a statement on 20 May 2021, the Moroccan Foreign Minister, Nasser Bourita, confirmed that the discomfort in Rabat had its origin in the transfer of Ghali and said that Ghali had travelled to Spain with a false passport and identity. Bourita added that Benyaich would not return to Spain while Ghali remained in Spanish territory, describing the matter as the "true cause" of the crisis, and accused Spanish media of leading a "campaign of media hostility" against Morocco.

=== International ===
The president of the European Commission, Ursula von der Leyen, expressed solidarity with Spain and called for consensus to produce a new pact on migration. The European Commissioner for Home Affairs, Ylva Johansson, stated that "Spanish borders are European borders". Charles Michel, President of the European Council, David Sassoli, President of the European Parliament, and European Commissioner Margaritis Schinas also responded to the incident.

The former vice president of the Italian council of ministers and leader of the far-right Lega Nord party, Matteo Salvini, applauded the action of the Spanish government on the border with Ceuta in a tweet that said in Italian: "Spain, with a leftist government, will send the army to the border to block the entry of illegal immigrants".

Amnesty International, describing the use of migrants as "political pawns", called for an investigation into alleged use of violence by the Spanish security forces and denounced the "long history of abuse of the rights of asylum seekers and migrants" by Morocco. It also called on Spain to guarantee the protection of minors and the European Union not to "make a blind eye" in face of possible abuses on the border.

=== Harassment of a Red Cross volunteer ===
After the event, several media outlets broadcast images in which a Red Cross volunteer hugged a migrant on the beach in Ceuta. Hours after they went viral, however, the volunteer closed her social media accounts due to a series of mass abuses and threats from anonymous users and figures linked to the Spanish far-right, such as Cristina Seguí, co-founder of Vox, and Hermann Tertsch. The volunteer later explained to RTVE that users had revealed her personal information and had racially insulted her. She described her hug as "the most normal thing in the world", adding that the migrant was crying from fatigue. In response to her comments, she received a multitude of messages of support through Twitter with the hashtag #GraciasLuna (translated as #ThanksLuna), among others, by the Minister of Economy, Nadia Calviño; the Minister of Labor, Yolanda Díaz; and the president of the International Federation of Red Cross and Red Crescent Societies, Jagan Chapagain.

== See also ==
- Perejil Island crisis
- 2007 Morocco–Spain diplomatic conflict
- 2014 Ceuta border incident
- 2022 Melilla border incident
- 2026 Ceuta migrant crisis
- Morocco-Spain relations
- Greater Morocco
- Refugees as weapons
