= Morocco–Spain border =

International border

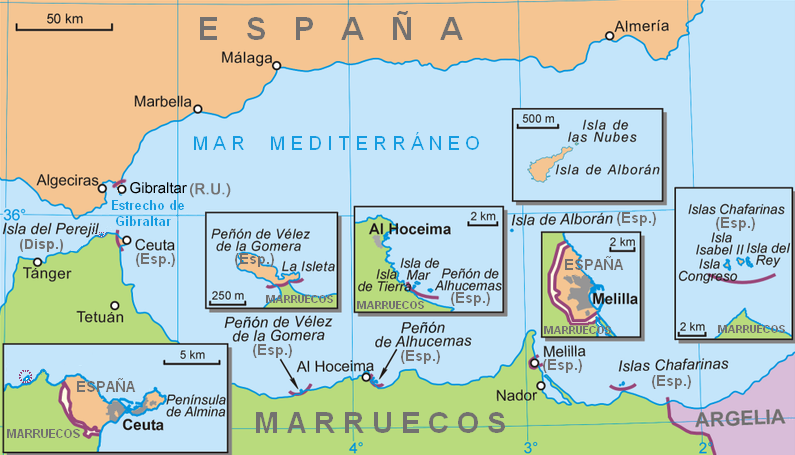

Characteristics
- Entities: Morocco Spain
- Length: 18.5 km (11.5 mi)

History
- Established: 1497; Conquest of Melilla
- Notes: Ceuta was conquered in 1415, earlier than Melilla, but it was conquered by Portugal and became regarded as a border between Portugal and Morocco. Ceuta only became a Spanish city, and consequently a border between Spain and Morocco, after the Portuguese Restoration War.

The border between Morocco and Spain consists of three non-contiguous lines totalling 18.5 km (11.5 miles) around the Spanish territories of Ceuta (8 km; 5 miles), Peñón de Vélez de la Gomera (85 metres; 279 feet) and Melilla (10.5 km; 6½ miles). Spanish islets such as the Chafarinas or the Alhucemas are located off the Moroccan coast.

== History ==
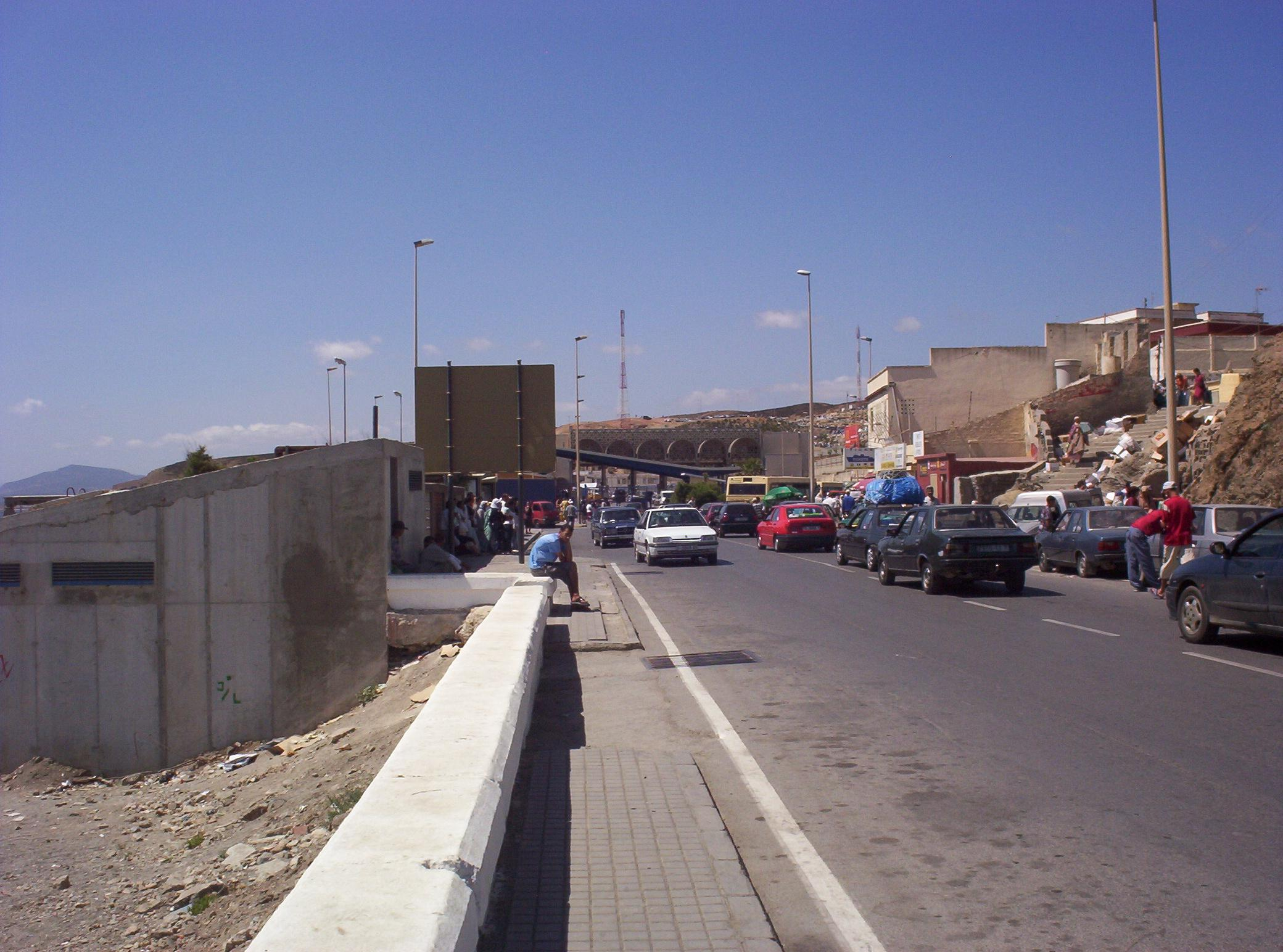
Spanish-Moroccan border in 2004

Historically the plazas de soberanía were part of various Muslim empires of north-west Africa. Ceuta was conquered by Portugal in 1415. Following the Reconquista of the Iberian Peninsula, Spain, looked south to the North African coast, capturing Melilla from the Sultanate of Fez in 1497, with Portugal's blessing. Spain took the then-island of Peñón de Vélez de la Gomera by force in 1508, with Portugal recognising this claim the following year with the Treaty of Cintra. Retaken by the Kingdom of Fez in 1554, Spain reconquered it in 1564, and it has remained in Spanish hands since that time.

During the period of Iberian Union (1580-1640) Ceuta attracted many Spanish settlers; as a result, when Portugal regained its independence from Spain in 1640 Ceuta opted to remain with Spain, a situation Portugal acquiesced to in 1668 with the Treaty of Lisbon. A treaty outlining Ceuta's boundary with the Alawi Sultanate of Morocco was signed 7 October 1844 and confirmed by another on 6 May 1845. A treaty outlining the Melilla-Morocco boundary, replete with a parallel 'neutral zone', was signed 24 August 1859.

Repeated Moroccan attempts to gain control of the two exclaves by force during the 18th-19th centuries failed, culminating in the Hispano–Moroccan War of 1859–60, which resulted in a Spanish victory. The subsequent Treaty of Wad-Ras (a.k.a. the Treaty of Tétouan) of 26 April 1860 expanded the border of Ceuta to its present limit. Melilla's border was supposed to be fixed by 'the range of a piece of cannon', however this proved impractical, and a further treaty was therefore signed on 30 October 1861 and confirmed on 26 June 1862 which outlined the modern boundary line. Localised disputes in Melilla continued however, and further treaties were signed in 1894–95.

By a Franco-Spanish treaty of 27 November 1912, Spain was granted a protectorate over Morocco's Mediterranean littoral, referred to as Spanish Morocco. Ceuta, Peñón de Vélez de la Gomera and Melilla thereafter were absorbed into the administration of this entity. When Morocco gained independence from France in 1956, Spain relinquished its protectorate in northern Morocco under the Hispano-Moroccan Joint Declaration of 7 April 1956. Spain retained the plazas de soberanía, which had not formed part of the protectorate established in 1912. Upon independence, Morocco laid claim to the Spanish-held territories, while Spain maintained that they were integral parts of Spanish territory.

In 1934, a huge storm created a tombolo between Peñón de Vélez de la Gomera and the Moroccan mainland, turning the island into a peninsula with an 85-metre (279-foot) international border.

Since Moroccan independence the dispute over the plazas de soberanía has flared up from time-to-time, most notably in 1975 when it was feared Morocco would attempt an invasion of the territories similar to the Green March invasion of Western Sahara conducted that same year. At present Spain remains in control of the plazas and refuses to discuss the issue of their sovereignty with Morocco.

In 1993, Spain began building the Ceuta and Melilla border fences, which were further strengthened in 1995. In response to an increase in the number of migrants' attempts to breach the fence, both were significantly fortified in 2005, creating a doubled-fence system replete with barbed wire and surveillance equipment. Since then there have been numerous attempts to cross the fences, resulting in several fatalities.

On 17 May 2021, more than 6,000 migrants crossed the border into Ceuta. It was widely speculated that Morocco permitted the sudden influx to punish Spain for allowing Polisario Front leader Brahim Ghali to be treated at a Spanish hospital. The next day, Morocco closed the border again. Most of the arrivals returned to Morocco.

On 24 June 2022, around 2,000 migrants and asylum seekers gathered in the early hours of the day to cross the Melilla border fence: 23 persons were killed after a crowd crush during a conflict with Moroccan and Spanish security forces.

In July 2026, the Spanish Interior Ministry announced that roughly 80,000 migrants had crossed the border and entered Ceuta, with 141 migrants dying. Many of the migrants subsequently returned to Morocco.

== Maritime borders ==
Morocco and Spain also share a maritime territorial border along the Strait of Gibraltar. At its narrowest point, the Strait of Gibraltar is 14.3 kilometres (8.9 mi; 7.7 nmi) wide.

The territorial seas are generally limited by the median-line rule under international law, unless specifically agreed.

The territorial seas between the Canary Islands and the Moroccan mainland do not meet, the shortest distance being approximately 96 kilometres (60 mi; 52 nmi), between Fuerteventura and the coast near Cape Juby. This exceeds the combined 24 nautical miles (44 km; 28 mi) maximum breadth of two territorial seas. Their potential exclusive economic zone entitlements nevertheless overlap, although no bilateral EEZ boundary has been agreed.

Spain and Morocco have likewise not concluded a comprehensive maritime-delimitation agreement in the Alboran Sea.

== Gallery ==
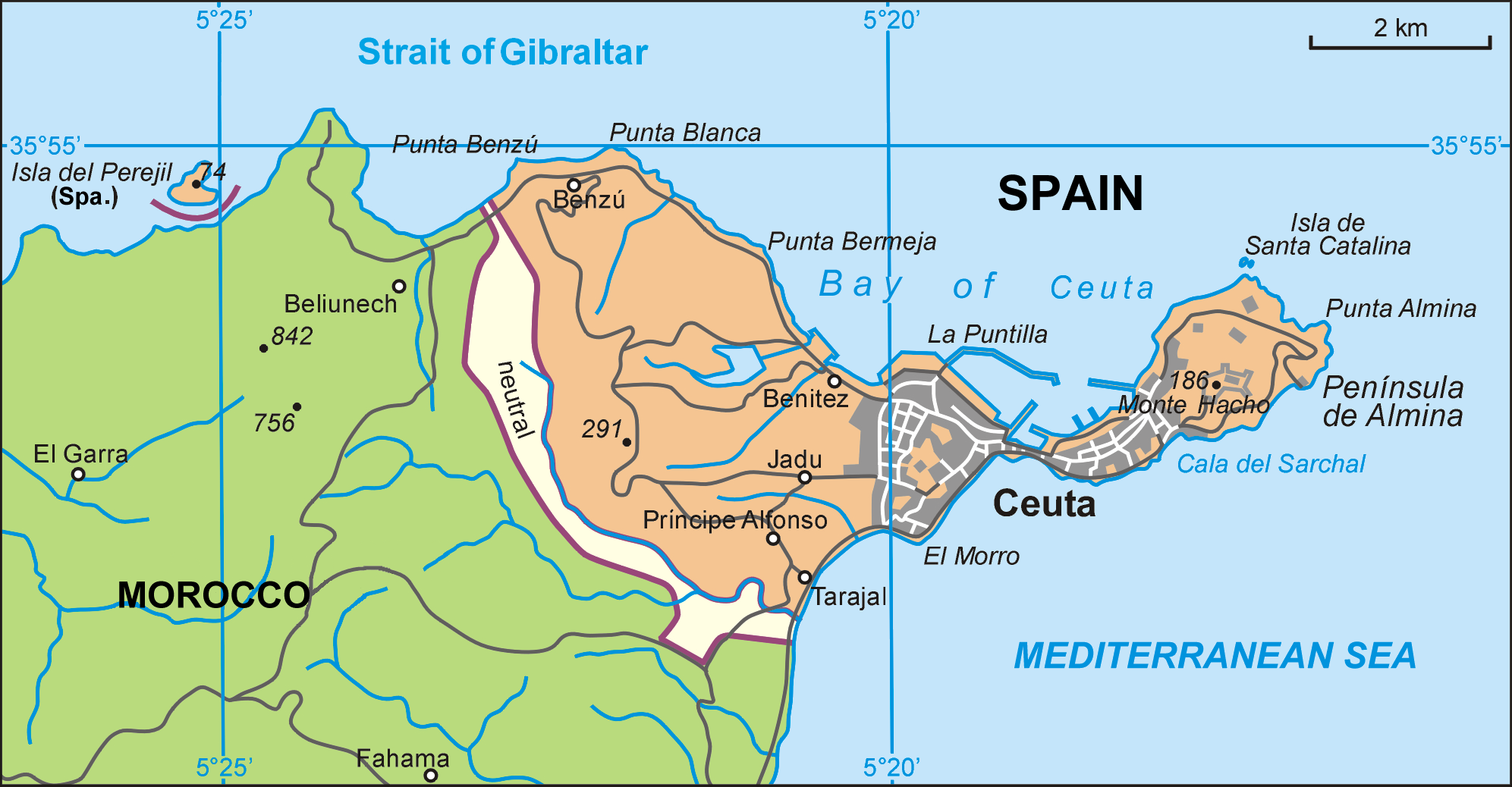
Map of Ceuta

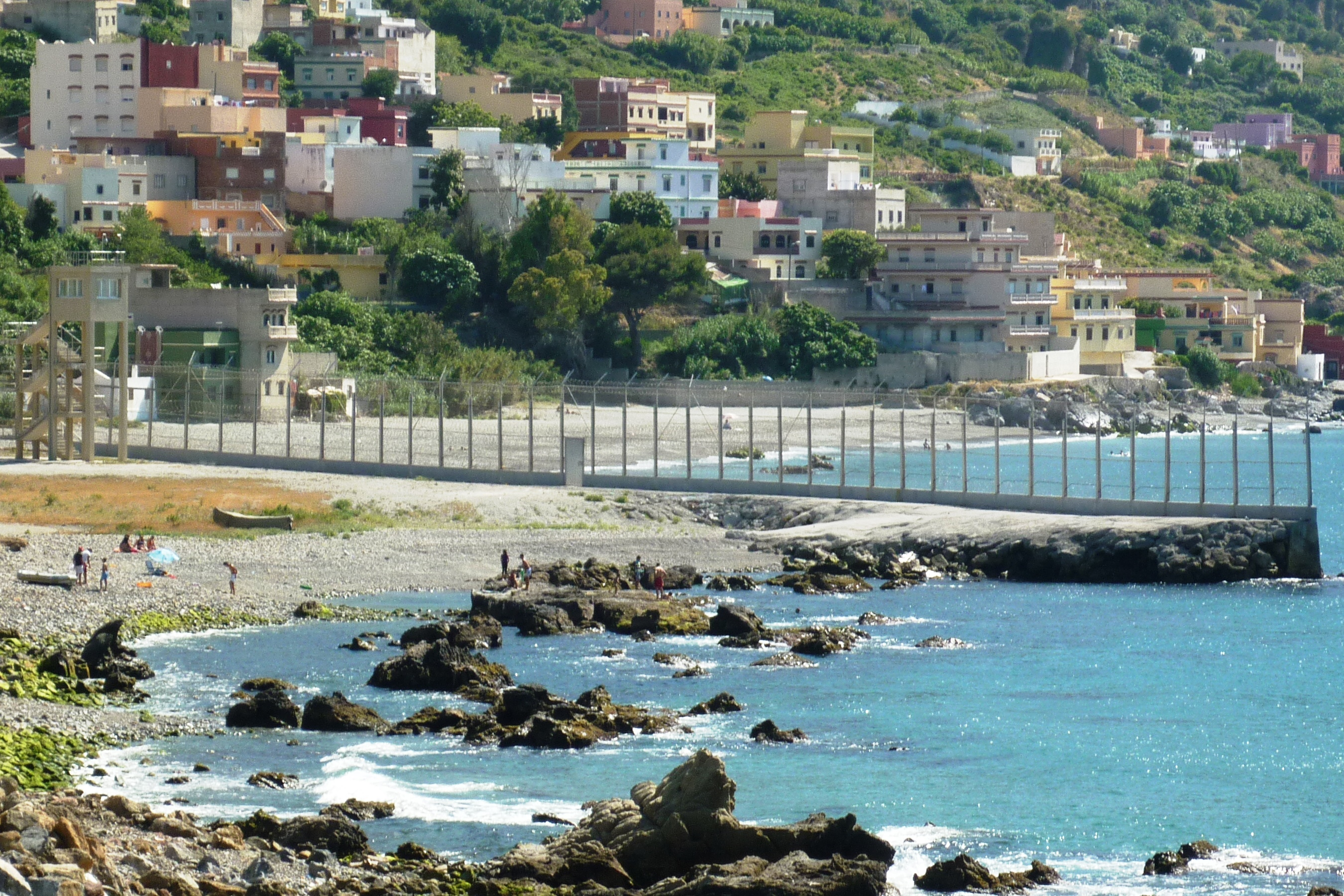
The Ceuta border fence as it enters the sea

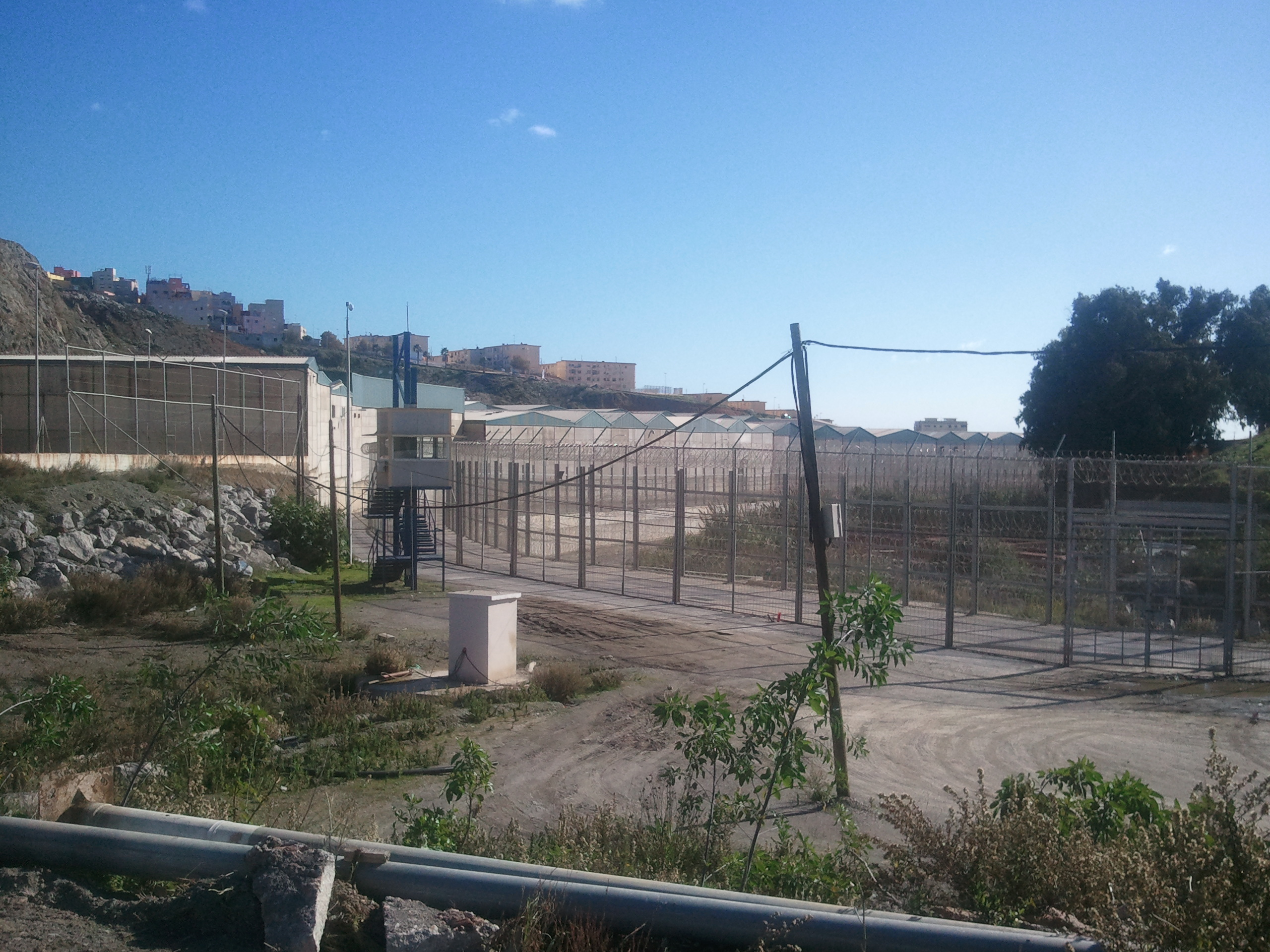
The Ceuta border fence

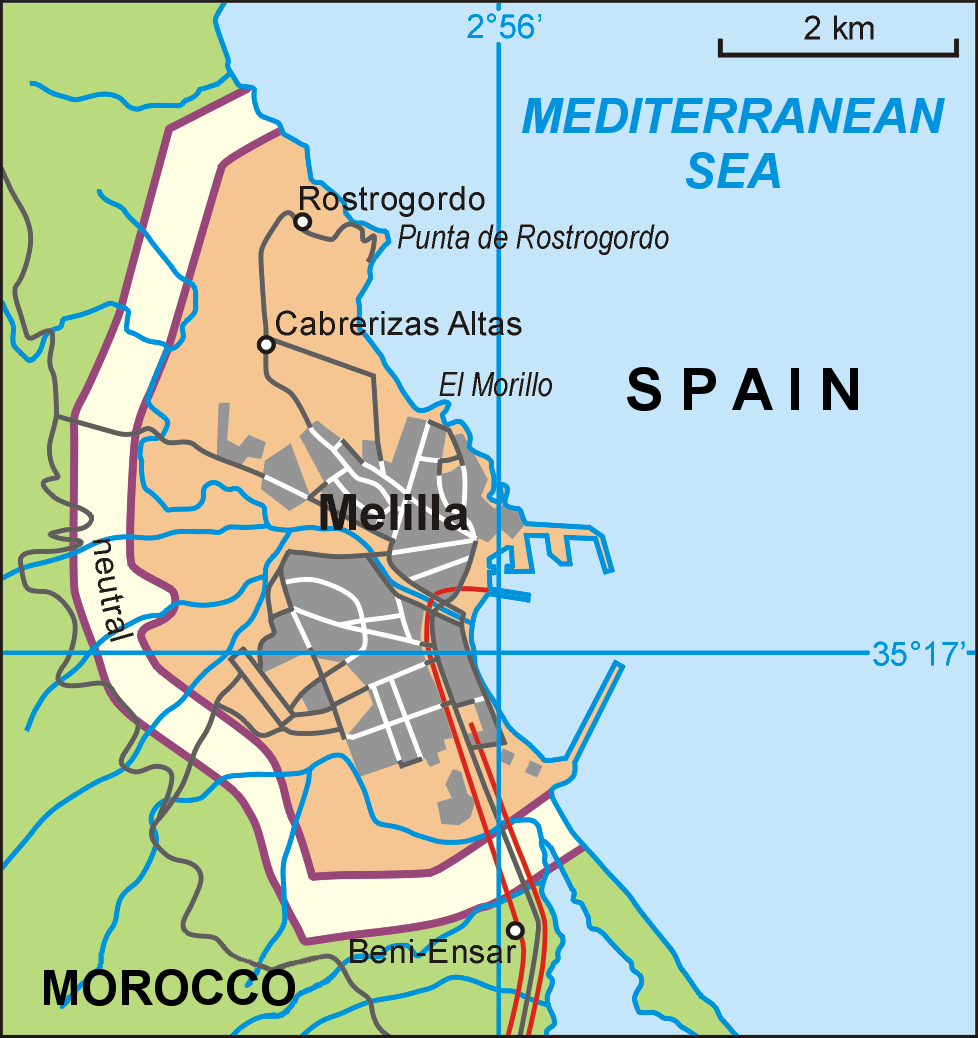
Map of Melilla

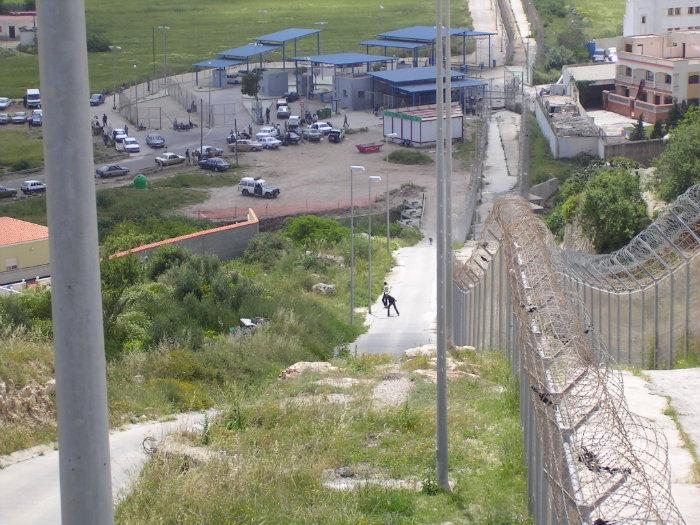
The Farjana–Melilla border crossing

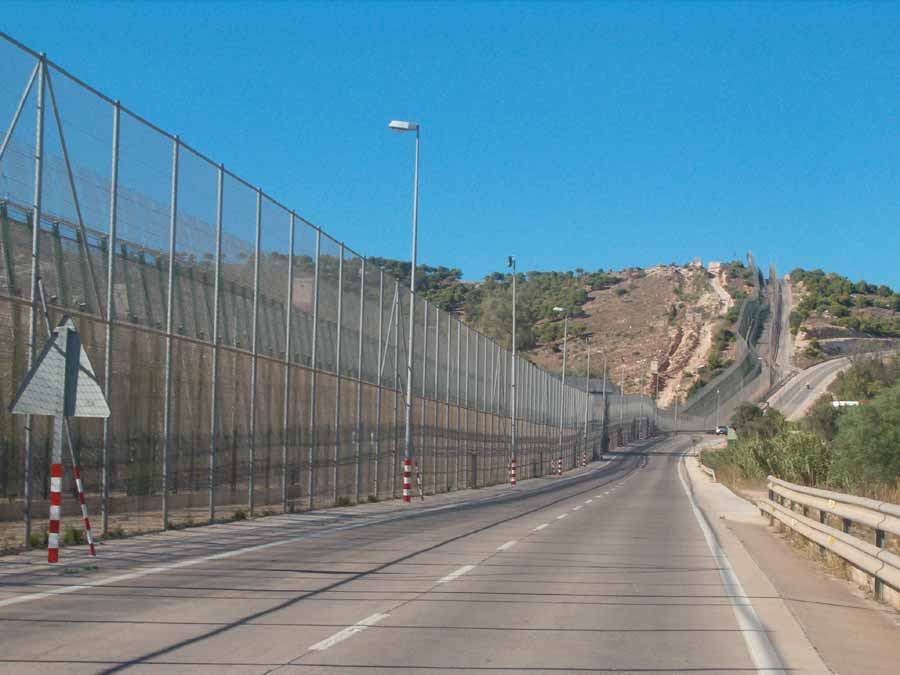
The Melilla border fence

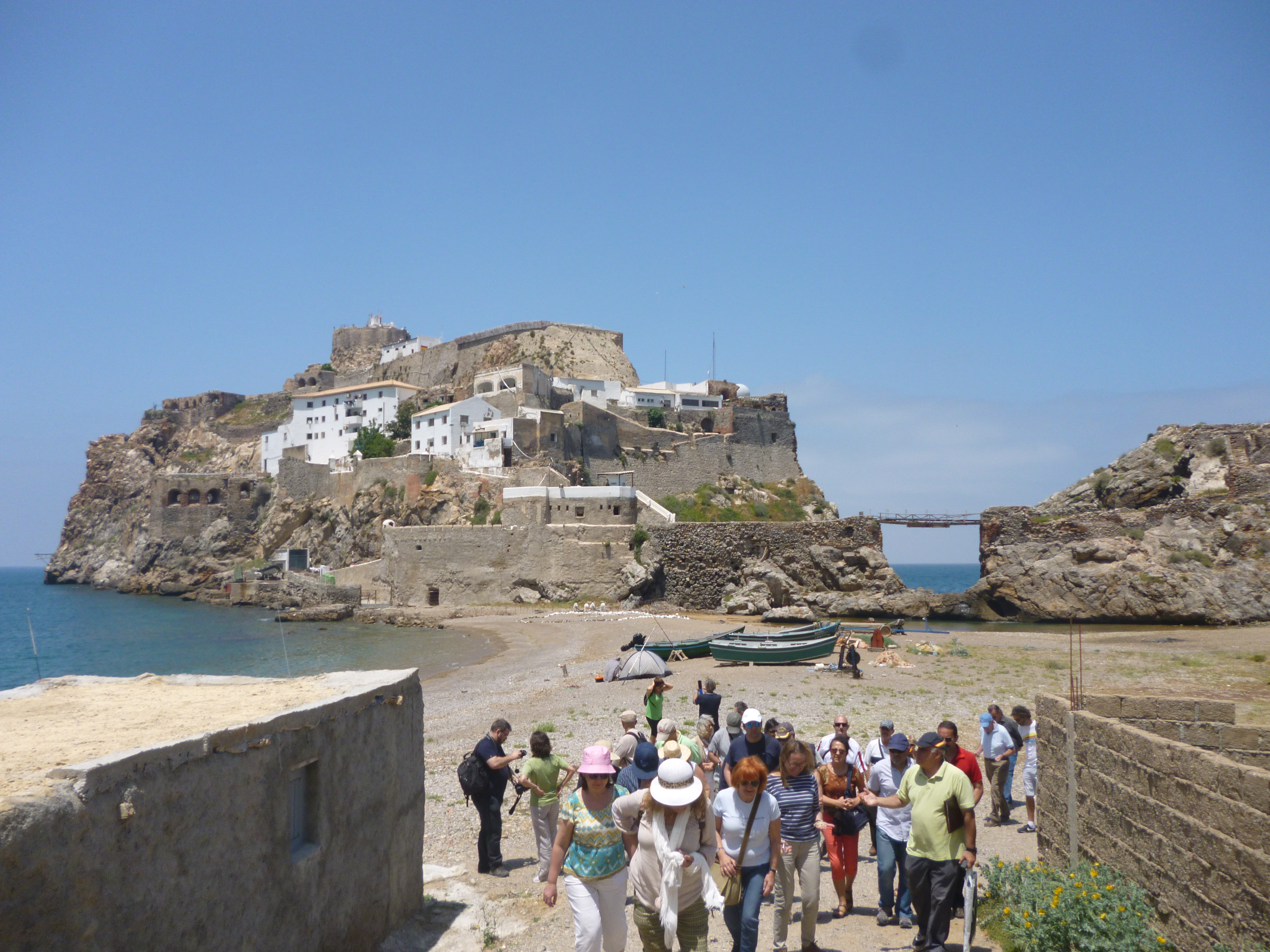
Peñón de Vélez de la Gomera; the border runs along the grey sand spit where the boats are laid

== See also ==
- Ceuta border fence
- Melilla border fence
- Morocco–Spain relations
- Plazas de soberanía
- Treaty of Wad Ras
