= Neo-medieval =

Neo-medieval may refer to:

- Medieval revival architecture, or neo-medieval architecture
- Neo-medieval music
- Neo-medievalism
- Neomedieval Forts in Ceuta, Spain
