= Morocco–Spain border incident =

Morocco–Spain border incident may refer to:

- 2021 Morocco–Spain border incident
- 2026 Morocco–Spain border incident
