= 2007 Morocco–Spain diplomatic conflict =

International incident

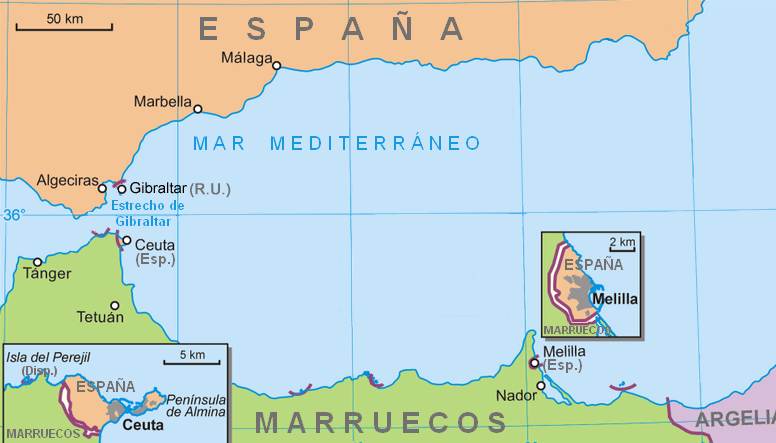
Ceuta and Melilla on the north coast of Africa.

The 2007 Morocco–Spain diplomatic conflict was a short-lived disturbance of international relations between Morocco and Spain that arose after the announcement of the impending visit of Juan Carlos I to the Spanish-ruled autonomous cities Ceuta and Melilla, which are claimed by Morocco.

The dispute formally began when the Government of Morocco recalled its ambassador to Spain, Omar Azziman. According to a diplomatic note from the Ministry of Foreign Affairs and Cooperation of Morocco, "The official announcement on Friday of the unfortunate visit of His Majesty King Juan Carlos I, on 5 and 6 November to the two occupied cities of Ceuta and Melilla is a regrettable initiative, whatever are the motives and objectives."

After reporting of calls of queries from the Ambassador, the Chief Moroccan Government Spokesperson said,"The ball is in the countryside of Spain and we hope that that country takes into consideration the sentiments of the Moroccan people and the interest of bilateral ties and cooperation."

The royal visit occurred on the scheduled dates, registering an influx of thousands of citizens, who cheered the King in both Ceuta and Melilla. During those days, statements against the visit continued to be made by the Moroccan authorities. In this regard, the Prime Minister of Morocco, Abbas El Fassi, compared the situation in both cities with the Israeli occupation of Palestinian Territories and King Mohammed VI himself described the visit as an "outdated and nostalgic act of a dark era." The Spanish government, just before the visit, and after the reporting of the Moroccan opposition, told through the Deputy Prime Minister Maria Teresa Fernandez de la Vega that the visit of the King of Spain was an act of 'institutional normality." Days later, at the initiative of certain groups in Morocco, some hundreds of people carried out protests in Tetuan, as well as front of the border with Ceuta and Melilla. Moroccan authority also discontinued high-level visits of Spanish authorities to their country.

Finally, the Minister of Foreign Affairs of Spain, Miguel Angel Moratinos, visited Rabat to meet his Moroccan counterpart, Taib Fassi Fihri on January 3, 2008, and presented him a personal letter from Prime Minister Jose Luis Rodriguez Zapatero to King Mohamed VI, which advocated for closer relations between both countries. Four days later, the Moroccan Foreign Ministry announced the return of its ambassador to Madrid, thus terminating the conflict.

== Royal visit ==
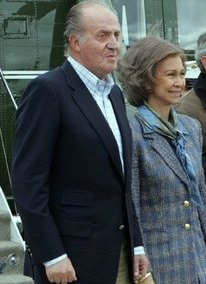
Juan Carlos I and Queen Sofia.

On October 30, the Government of Spain announced the visit of King Juan Carlos I and Queen Sofia to Ceuta and Melilla from 5 and 6 November. The day before, the Spanish Prime Minister Jose Luis Rodriguez Zapatero, had told that fact to the opposition leader Mariano Rajoy during an official ceremony, which Rajoy welcomed.

The King of Spain had not visited Ceuta and Melilla in his reign. The most immediate antecedent of the stay of King Juan Carlos I in these cities dates back to 1970, when he undertook a visit to Ceuta in his capacity as Prince of Asturias on the occasion of the fiftieth anniversary of the Spanish Legion.

The last visit of a Head of State of Spain to Ceuta and Melilla was by king Alfonso XIII, who was last seen in 1927, and President of the Second Republic, Niceto Alcala Zamora, on 4 November 1933.

The king of Spain was scheduled to visit to the autonomous city of Melilla in 1997 on the occasion of the five hundredth anniversary of the founding of the city, but the pressure of the Moroccan authorities led to the cancellation of the visit.

On November 5, the King and the Queen of Spain stayed in Ceuta for five hours, where they spoke to the Assembly of the Autonomous City, where the monarch said that he "had an pending commitment to Ceuta". Neither the king nor the Minister of Public Administration who accompanied him, Elena Salgado, or any other Spanish authority made any mention of the situation in Morocco. The King was welcomed by 25,000 people.

On November 6, the king came to Melilla, in which the Spanish monarch intervened the Assembly. There he acknowledged the loyalty of Melillans to the Crown. He made specific reference to Morocco, but said that "Spain through mutual respect cultivates relations of sincere friendship with its neighbors." The number of people who gathered to welcome the King was estimated at 30,000.

== Additional background of the conflict ==
A month before the announcement of the royal visit, the judge of the National Court of Spain, Baltasar Garzón, had opened a file to investigate an alleged genocide of Sahrawis by Morocco, accepting to process the lawsuit filed in 2006 by various associations defending human rights and relatives of prisoners and disappeared Saharawis, which accused 31 senior officials of Moroccan security. Morocco, meanwhile, was accused of siding with the positions of the Polisario Front. Moroccan spokesman said that "it would be good that Judge Garzon deal a bit of respect for human rights in Tindouf." Among the accused were Driss Basri and former Interior Minister and General Housni Benslimane.

As stated by Yassine Mansouri, Foreign Secret Service Chief of Morocco, during a stay in Mallorca, the deterioration of relations is also related to the active position of the Spanish Government and local authorities to untie Muslim believers of Ceuta and the Ministry of Religious Affairs of Morocco; and to bet on movements like the Tablig (Congregation for the Propagation of Islam) or the Muslim Brotherhood. Mansouri informed this to Alberto Saiz, Director of National Intelligence of Spain.

The position was due to the wrath of King Mohamed VI, according to Mansouri, he remembered that Moroccan King is the Commander of the Faithful and many mosques in Ceuta had been attached to the Union of Islamic Communities of Spain (UCIDE) (36 of 40 Islamic communities of Ceuta). The image of the UCID leader in Ceuta, Laarbi Maateis, is associated with radical Islamist movements by Morocco. For his part, Laarbi Maateis denied any involvement with fundamentalist movements, indicating that no member of Tablig had ever been arrested or identified as a suspect in connection with jihadism. He also said the prosecution were not understandable "because the Maliki rite is practiced both here and in the rest of Spain and Morocco and no one has tried to change that, especially because it seems to be the best for the city."

== Position of the Moroccan government ==
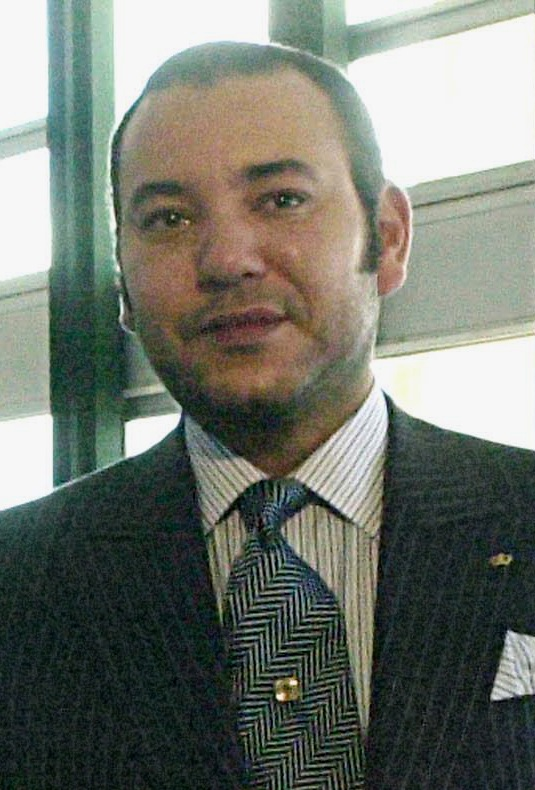
Mohamed VI.

The Prime Minister of Morocco, Abbas El Fassi, reported to the Moroccan parliament that his government would not spare efforts to regain the two cities (Ceuta and Melilla). The next day, November 1, Abbas el Fassi asked the King of Spain to "waive" the trip, while the Minister and Speaker of the Moroccan government, Khalid Naciri, expressed the "total rejection and condemnation" of the royal visit to "despoiled Moroccan cities." Abbas el Fassi, however, at the time said the Spanish press that there was no coercion and that the conflict "must be approached with intelligence, mutual respect, dialogue and concertation."

On November 5, while King Juan Carlos I was visiting Ceuta, Abbas el Fassi compared the situation of Ceuta and Melilla to the Israeli occupation of Palestine during a special session of the Moroccan Parliament to discuss the issue.

Decolonization continues to be topical in the few spots that remain in the world, including occupied Palestine, the cities of Ceuta and Melilla ....

The same opinion was pronounced by the leader of the Moroccan Islamist Justice and Development Party, Mustafa Ramid, by manifesting in the Parliament that "the Moroccans living under Spanish colonization are as our fellow Palestinians under Israeli colonization."

=== Manifestations of King Mohamed VI ===
On November 6, after holding a Council of Ministers before intervening in the acts of commemoration of the Green March in the Parliament, Moroccan King Mohamed VI issued a harsh condemnation through a personnel spokesman:

Strongly we express our strong condemnation and as firmly denounce this unprecedented visit. [...] Given this act was to overcome a nostalgic and dark era, the Spanish authorities must assume their responsibility for the consequences that could jeopardize the future and the development of relations between both countries. [...]

In the same statement Mohamed VI called for the formal opening of negotiations on the two cities:

It is well established that the best way to resolve conflict and manage this land requires respect for the virtues of an honest dialogue, frank and open about the future, a dialogue that ensures our right to sovereignty and to take into account the interests of Spain. [...] Morocco has continued to demand an end to the Spanish occupation of Ceuta and Melilla and nearby islands in the plundered north of the kingdom.

=== Reactions of the Moroccan government after the visit of the King ===
On 15 November, the government spokesman Khalid Naciri, after a Governing Council, stated that he hoped that the Spanish "place their hand into ours to overcome the crisis and privileging our bilateral relationship. The Spanish-Moroccan relations have undergone a crisis." Do not set a date for the return of the ambassador to Madrid, insist on the need for a dialogue between the parties about the future of the Spanish autonomous cities and it is expected for the future that "our Spanish friends will consider our feelings, our sensitivity and our claims; the purpose is not to create difficulties but to preserve our relations." However, on 16 November, the Government of Morocco suspended two high-level visits of Spanish authorities:that of the Minister of Public Works, Magdalena Álvarez, who had planned to deal with the Moroccan Minister of Equipment and Transport Karim Ghellab about the Gibraltar rail tunnel to link the two countries across the strait (an issue on which both are officially working since 2005 when Tangier was treated evolving the fixed links between Europe and Africa and Chief of Staff of the Army of Spain, Admiral Sebastian Zaragoza.

== Position of the Spanish Government ==
On the same day, November 1, the Minister of Foreign Affairs of Spain, Miguel Angel Moratinos, who was visiting the Moroccan city of Marrakesh, reported orally to the Moroccan Foreign Minister Taieb Fassi-Fihri, despite the manifestations of the Prime Minister, that the King of Spain would visit the cities of Ceuta and Melilla on 5 and 6 November as planned. That same day, in the usual appearance of the Government of Spain after the conclusion of the regular meeting of the Council of Ministers, the Second Deputy Prime Minister Maria Teresa Fernandez de la Vega said that relations with the Moroccan government "were extraordinary" and the journey of the Kings fell within the "institutional normality." Foreign Affairs Minister, Moratinos ruled out an action similar withdrawing the ambassador of Spain in Rabat, Spanish diplomatic sources said.

On November 3, Defense Minister José Antonio Alonso, in a statement to the Cadena SER said that he hoped the gesture of calling the ambassador-step prior to the breakdown of diplomatic relations, he repeated the words said by Deputy Prime Minister the previous day on the normality of the visit.

The Minister of Foreign Affairs expressed on November 14 its confidence in the return of the Moroccan ambassador in Madrid "as soon as possible."

== Political reactions ==
=== Political reactions in Spain ===
The People's Party and United Left political parties, through Angel Acebes and Gaspar Llamazares, respectively, announced their support for the visit of the King of Spain to Ceuta and Melilla. Gustavo de Arístegui, of the People Party, termed Mohamed VI's reaction as "excessive" and criticized the Spanish Prime Minister for failing to make clear, in his view, the 'red lines' that Morocco could not cross. Meanwhile, Elena Valenciano, International Relations Secretary of the Spanish Socialist Workers' Party, stressed that the visit was part of "the most absolute institutional normality."

The President of Melilla, Juan José Imbroda, said that "it is not the time to make opposite sounding declarations", in reference to the Moroccan position. Coalition for Melilla, the prime Muslim-based opposition party in the autonomous city, manifested itself as extremely pleased with the visit the King, adding that the presence of the King of Spain was a "historic debt in this city and which, from this formation, we always advocate for the occurrence of the visit." For his part, the President of Ceuta, Juan Jesús Vivas, merely issued an edict in which he urged the citizens to welcome the King, honor him by the presence of Ceutans, and "you will honor yourselves, our city and our beloved country."
