= Playa El Tarajal =

Beach in Ceuta, Spain

Coordinates: 35°52′18.43″N 5°20′36.43″W

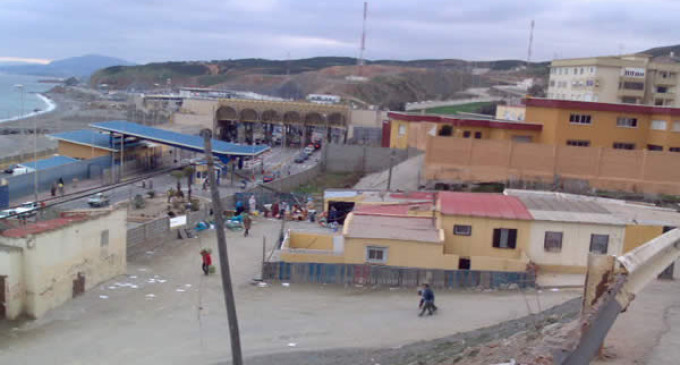
Morocco–Spain border

Playa El Tarajal is a beach of Ceuta, bordering northern Morocco. The beach is about 250 metres in length with an average width of about 15 metres.

The beach is at the southern tip of Ceuta where the N13 coastal road leaves for Morocco.

== History ==
On 6 February 2014, 14 illegal immigrants died while trying to reach Spain when Spanish authorities attacked them using riot gear.
