= 2022 Melilla border incident =

Event in Melilla, Spain

- Part of Morocco–Spain relations
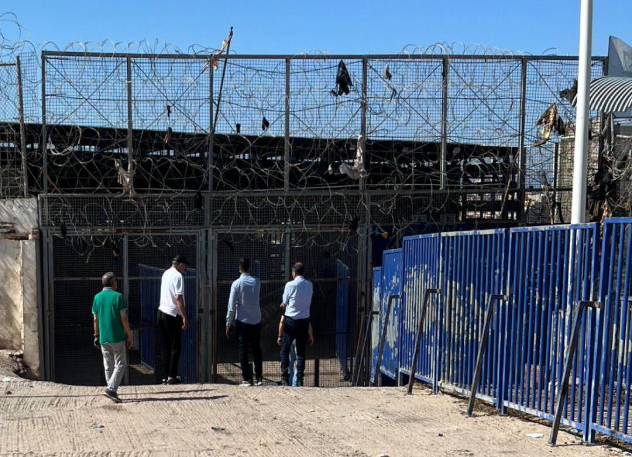
- The gates of the buffer zone the day after the incident
- Date: 24 June 2022
- Location: Barrio Chino border crossing between Morocco and Spain
- Deaths: 23 migrants
- Injuries: 140 law enforcement officers; 77 migrants
- Missing: 0-70 migrants (Higher number according to Moroccan Association for Human Rights)

On 24 June 2022, 23 migrants and asylum seekers were killed after a crowd crush at the Melilla border fence during a conflict with Moroccan and Spanish security forces. The conflict broke out as around 2,000 migrants and asylum seekers gathered in the early hours of the day to cross the border into Spain.

== Incident ==
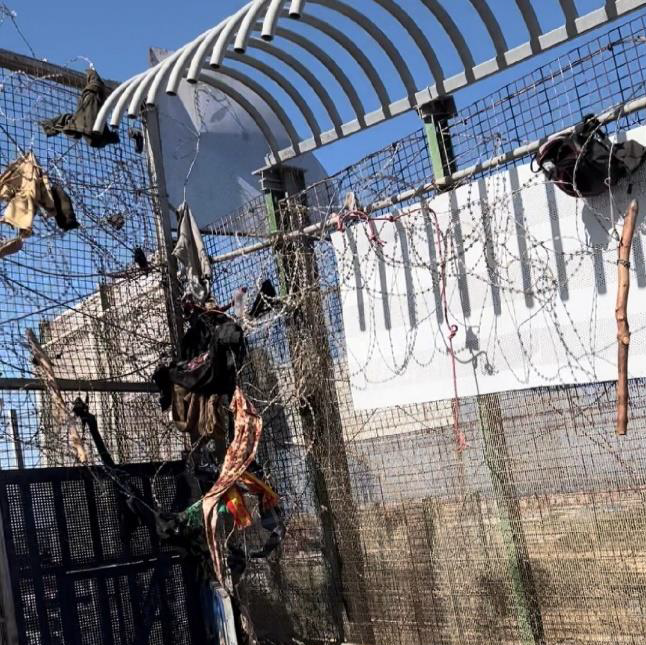
Remnants of clothing, wooden sticks and backpacks stuck to the barbed wire at the border crossing

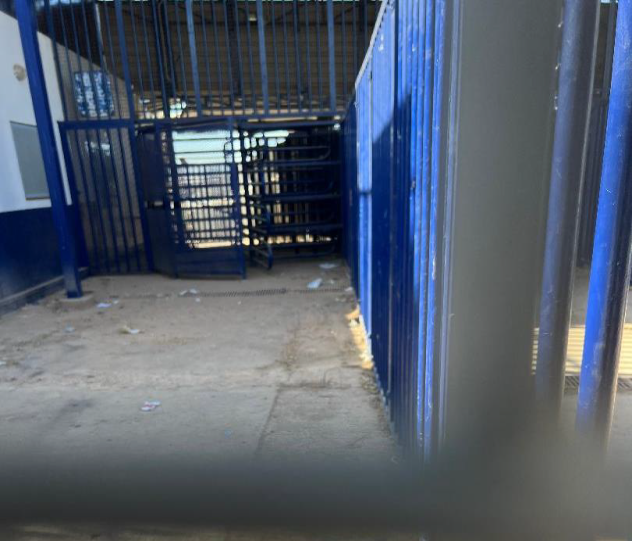
Turnstiles where migrants were trapped at the crossing

The incident happened when close to 2,000 migrants and asylum seekers, mostly from Sudan, a country known for numerous human rights' violations, moved on foot from the Aznouden forest near Nador towards Melilla. Security forces from both nations arrived to disperse the crowd but their efforts resulted in violent fighting with the migrants lasting for two hours. Spanish and Moroccan officials said that their border guards had been assaulted with weapons and had to fight back in self-defense.

Some migrants and asylum seekers forced open a gate after reaching the border crossing, while others tried to climb over the border fence. After climbing the fence, many people got stuck in courtyards with turnstile doors that could not be opened from inside. The areas quickly got overcrowded, causing people to trample over each other, causing a crush. Several others fell from the fence onto the ground.

Twenty-three migrants and asylum seekers were killed, 5 of whom died during the crossing attempt and 13 who died from their injuries in the hospital. 77 other sustained injuries and 140 Moroccan officers were wounded, five seriously, and 49 Spanish Civil Guards were lightly injured. 133 people reached Spanish territory. 470 were pushed back to the border. A preliminary examination of the migrants and asylum seekers' bodies demonstrated that every dead person showed signs of cervicofacial congestion and cyanosis on the face.

The Moroccan Association for Human Rights said that 29 people had been killed and 70 were missing. The NGO Colectivo Caminando Fronteras (lit. "Walking Borders Collective") estimated at least 37 killed. NGOs also reported that two Moroccan gendarmes were killed.

Prime Minister of Spain Pedro Sánchez said that the incident was a "well-organized, violent assault" by organized crime groups and thanked Spanish and Moroccan security forces for their actions.

Sidi Salem cemetery operators prepared several graves where Moroccan authorities buried the deceased.

Among the migrants held in custody in Nador, the Moroccan public prosecutor's office charged 29 migrants with felonies, including "organizing and facilitating the clandestine entry and exit of people to and from Morocco on a regular basis", "kidnapping and retention of a civil servant to use them as a hostage", "setting a fire in a forest", and "insults and violence against law enforcement agents". 36 migrants were charged with misdemeanors. Four of the 65 detainees are Chadian, while the rest are Sudanese. The Public Prosecutor's office ordered autopsies and identification of the deceased through DNA.

== Reactions ==
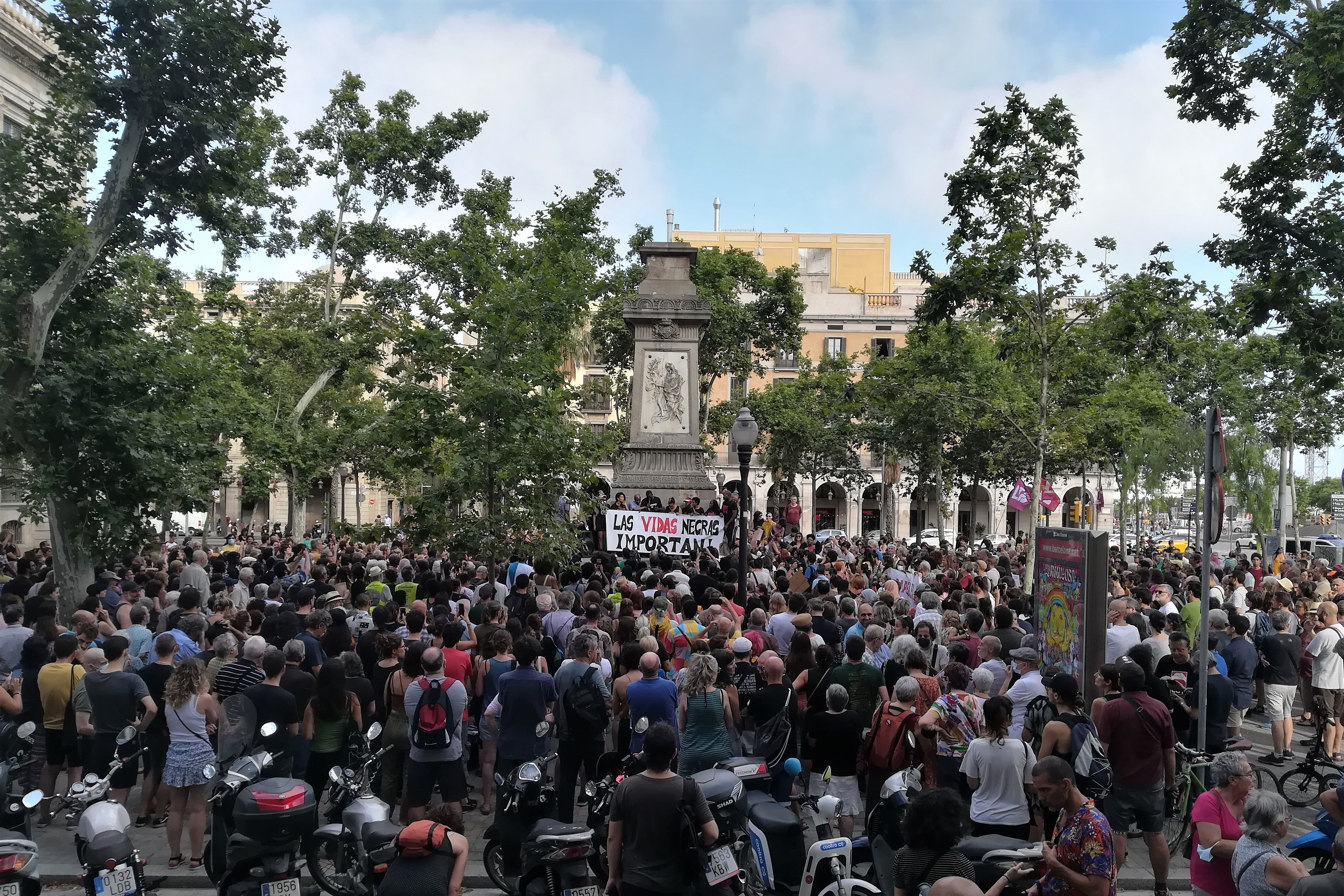
Protestors in Barcelona after the incident

Faced with silence throughout the day of the events and the leaking of videos and photographs of several unconscious, neglected, bloody, crowded and dead migrants in police custody, the situation took on a lot of international media coverage and dismay. The Prime Minister of the Government of Spain, Pedro Sánchez (PSOE) justified the intervention and pointed out that “it is necessary to recognize the extraordinary work that the Moroccan Government has done in coordination with security of the State of Spain to try to avoid a violent assault, it has been well fixed by the two security forces", in addition to recognizing and thanking the importance of having relations with a strategic partner such as Morocco "and pointing out the mafias as the only culprits of the events that occurred". Several of the actions condemned by human rights organizations have also occurred in Spanish jurisdiction and not only in Morocco, as initially pointed out. The Spanish Civil Guard denied in statements to France Presse that it knew anything about this matter. According to Moroccan police sources, it was an action measured "by the use of very violent methods" by migrants and that they died "only by the avalanche of people" while crossing it.

Algerian President Abdelmadjid Tebboune publicly accused Morocco of having committed "a carnage" in Melilla. President-elect of Colombia Gustavo Petro expressed his solidarity with the families of the "massacred victims" and reaffirmed his commitment "to all African peoples fighting hunger and for life." Due to media pressure, the Moroccan Ministry of Foreign Affairs convened an emergency meeting with representatives of African states to justify the punitive action alleging the violence perpetrated by migrants when crossing the prison. In the case of the European Commission, its spokeswoman for Foreign Affairs and Security, Nabila Massrali, postulated that the European authorities had contacted the Moroccans to try to understand the event, but avoided demanding any report or research commission. On 27 June the African Union Commission called for an investigation into the Melilla tragedy.

10 NGOs requested the identification and return of the remains to their families instead of a swift burial in the Sidi Salem cemetery near Nador.

On 26 June hundreds of people demonstrated in Madrid, Barcelona and other Spanish cities against the "massacre" of at least 37 migrants and asked for explanations for what happened, both from the Spanish and the Moroccan governments.

== Aftermath ==
In September 2022, the General Directorate of Cadastre (DGC) and the National Geographic Institute (IGN), the two State institutions responsible for the delimitation of the territory in Spain, determined that the Melilla incident was perpetrated entirely on Spanish soil. Despite the fact that the incident occurred beyond the Melilla fence, the territory forms part of the "security zone" (not "no man's land"), which officially forms an integral part of Spanish territory, despite the fact that de facto, the Moroccan authorities are the ones that control the area even without having their sovereignty. That the Cadastre and the National Geographic Institute recognize as part of the national territory the place where all or a large part of the sub-Saharans died could have legal consequences since it would give the Spanish justice powers to investigate what happened. However, spokesmen for the Ministry of the Interior declared that "no one, neither the State security forces nor the Moroccan authorities, nor the Prosecutor's Office nor the Ombudsman, has the slightest doubt that the deceased were in Moroccan territory" and that "It is clear that the deaths occurred in the area of action of the Moroccan authorities, in which the civil guards did not have access."

Morocco’s National Human Rights Institution established a fact-finding commission on 27 June, the commission released a preliminary report on 13 July. The Spanish Ombudsman released their preliminary findings in October. The Moroccan Association for Human Rights accused the Moroccan authorities of trying to cover up the deaths, noting that six days after the tragedy, no autopsy had been performed and no effort had been made to identify the deceased. The Moroccan courts subsequently sentenced thirteen of the immigrants who failed to reach Spanish territory to two and a half years in prison and a fine of 10,000 dirhams.

Subsequently, El País carried out an investigation, analyzing the videos and with various interviews, in which it was stated that the death of at least one immigrant had occurred on the Spanish side. It also confirmed that they received tear gas and beatings by the police of both countries. Also, according to relatives, they counted 70 missing.

On 23 December 2022 the Spanish Prosecutor's Office decided to close the investigation into the deaths of emigrants in June at the Melilla border, exonerating the Ministry of the Interior, the Civil Guard and the agents who were on the border that day from any responsibility. According to elDiario.es, "the decree of the Public Ministry does not specify whether any of the deaths took place in Spanish territory, it states that 'the events that led to the avalanche occurred in Moroccan territory' and that 'the crowding of people occurred between both sites border'. The Prosecutor's Office understands that the actions of the guards were proportionate and informs the Civil Guard that several agents threw stones at the migrants, in case there was any type of disciplinary infraction."

== See also ==
- 2014 Ceuta border incident
- 2021 Morocco–Spain border incident
- 2026 Ceuta migrant crisis
