= Torre de Piniés =

Monument in Ceuta, Spain

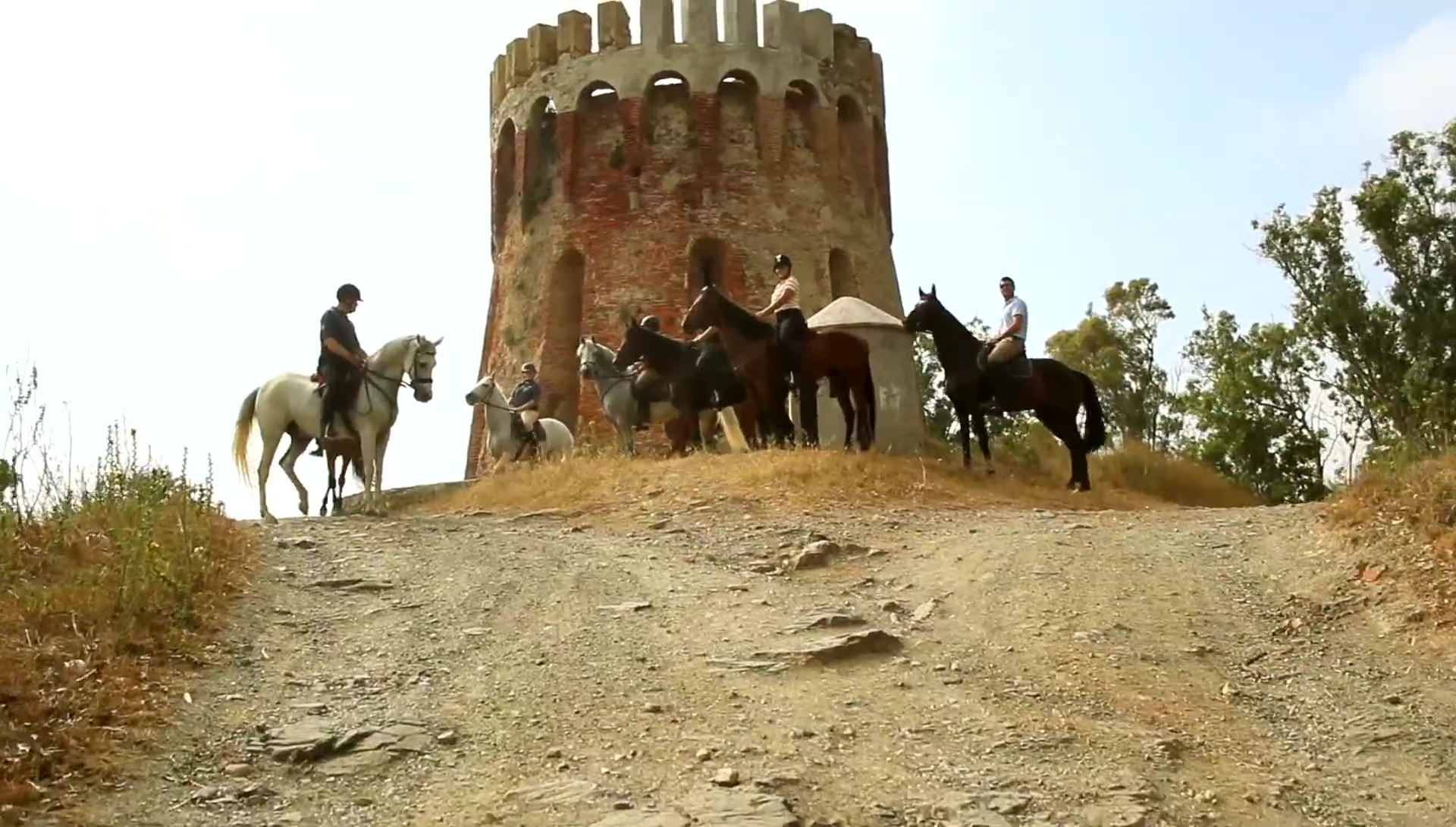
- Torre de Piniés
- Interactive map of the Torre de Piniés area

General information
- Type: monument
- Location: Ceuta; Spain
- Coordinates: 35°52′58″N 5°21′52″W

The Torre de Piniés is one of the 19th-century Neomedieval Forts built to secure the border of the Spanish city of Ceuta. It is a BIC.

== History ==
It was built between 1862 and 1864, reformed in 1866, and would adopt the definitive morphology in 1877. It was designed by the Commander of Engineers Mendicuti. It was named in honor of Antonio de Piniés y Lasierra, a Spanish nobleman and military man, died during the War of Africa

== Description ==
It is a neo-medieval style fort for 40 men, built with a high-rise circular tower typology, two floors and a battery, with a central staircase. It has a dry circular moat, machicolations and battlements.

It is built in concrete and lime, masonry, solid brick and ashlar.
