= Neomedieval Forts =

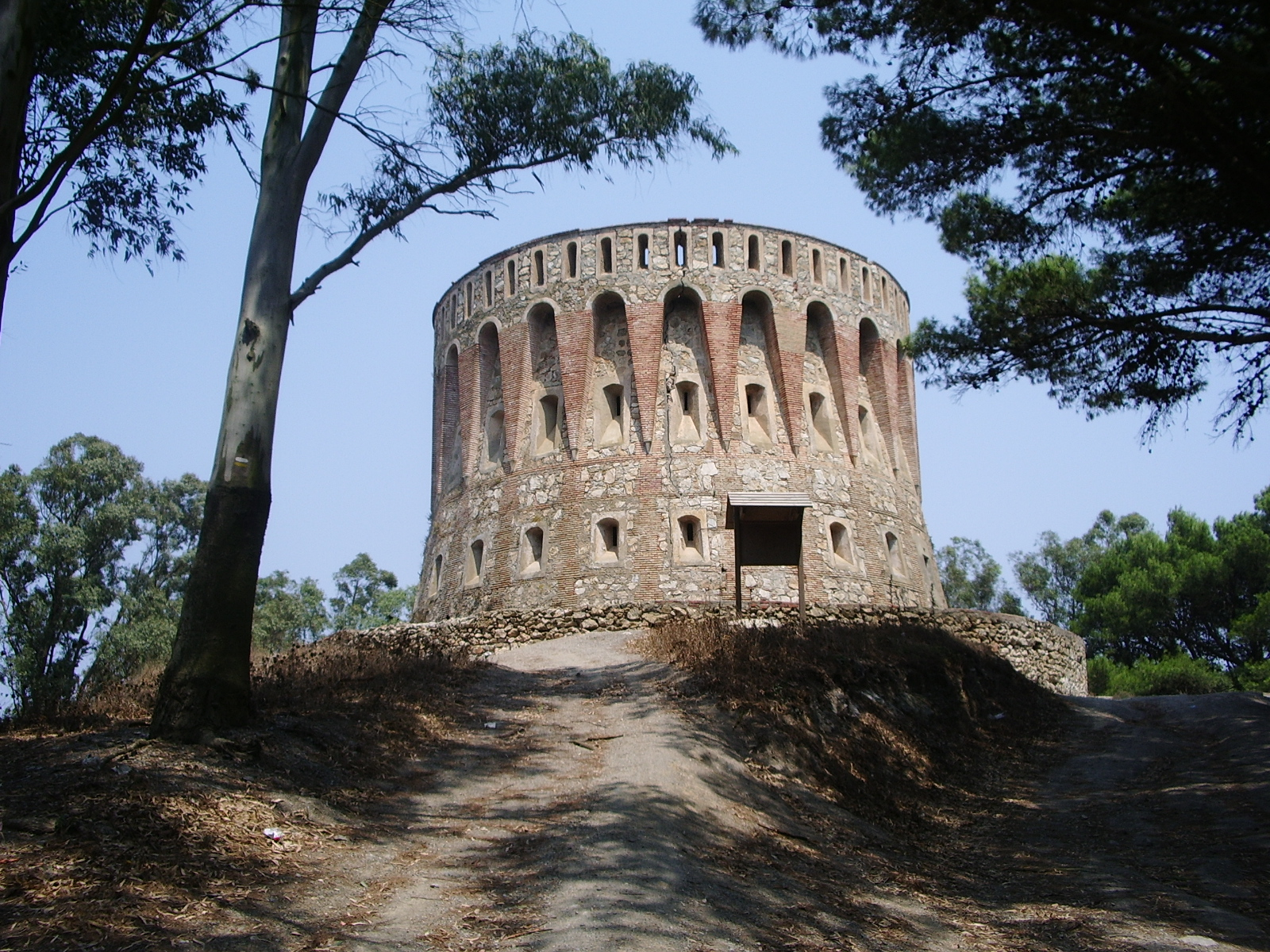
- Torre de Aranguren, Ceuta

General information
- Type: Historical complex
- Location: Ceuta; Spain

The Neomedieval Forts are a complex of fortifications in the mountainous area that closes the Ceuta peninsula on its border with Morocco.

== History ==
They were built in the mid-nineteenth century when, after the War of Wad-Ras with Morocco and sealed peace with the Treaty of Wad-Ras, it was considered appropriate to secure the border with a series of watchtowers to prevent possible aggression from the exterior. In this way, the towers of: Aranguren, Yebel Ányera, Renegado, very transformed, Isabel II, Francisco de Asís, Piniés and Mendizábal were raised, in addition to the Fort of Principe Alfonso.
