= Weaponized migration =

Moving refugees to cause political issues

Weaponized migration, or refugees as weapons, is a term used to describe a hostile government organizing, or threatening to organize, a sudden influx of refugees into another country or political entity with the intent of causing political disturbances in that entity. The responsible country (or sometimes a non-state actor) usually seeks to extract concessions from the targeted country and achieve some political, military, and/or economic objective.

The U.S. Army Center for Army Lessons Learned released a handbook entitled "Commander's Guide to Support Operations Among Weaponized Displaced Persons, Refugees, and Evacuees". The handbook provides a basic overview of considerations and methods of reaction should CBRN warfare be executed using dislocated civilians.

== Migration coercion ==
Migration coercion is the utilization, or threatens to utilize, migration as an instrument to induce behavioral changes, or to gain concessions from the receiving target. In 1966, Teitelbaum and Weiner stated that in foreign policy governments create mass migrations as a tool to achieve non migrant goals. An example during Afghanistan conflict (1978–present) is Soviet attempt to influence Pakistani decision-making by driving Afghans to seek asylum across the Durand Line.

=== Operation Peter Pan & Rafter crisis ===
Cuban exiles fled from or left the island of Cuba after the Cuban Revolution of 1959. Between November 1960 and October 1962, over 14,000 children were sent to the U.S. by their parents with Operation Peter Pan in response to the CIA and Cuban dissidents spreading rumors of a project by the castrist government to remove the parents' custody of their children to indoctrinate them. Authors John Scanlan and Gilburt Loescher note how the United States acceptance of Cuban emigrants after the 1959 Cuban Revolution was done in hopes they could help the United States forcibly remove the Fidel Castro government from Cuba. The acceptance of Cuban emigrants during the Freedom Flights was done in hopes of weakening the Cuban economy by draining it of workers. The United States also was generally able to paint a negative picture of Cuba by participating in the mass emigration of many who disliked Cuba and wished to flee the island. The Department of State painted Cuban emigrants in the 1960s as freedom-seeking refugees. The United States had lost its total aggressive foreign policy towards Cuba and instead viewed the island as a nuisance rather than a security threat after the Mariel boatlift. The Mariel boatlift was soon canceled after it was initiated and received little public American support. The 1994 Cuban rafter crisis was the emigration of more than 35,000 Cubans to the United States via makeshift rafts. In response to the crisis Bill Clinton would enact the Wet feet, dry feet policy where only Cuban rafters that make it to U.S. soil will be allowed to remain. The U.S. will also only approve 20,000 immigration visas a year for Cubans. Fidel Castro benefited from the exile because he was able to remove disloyalty by directly removing disloyal citizens from Cuba, which is migration exportive. After sending more than 100,000 Cuban migrants to Florida, Fidel Castro coerced the United States into foreign policy concessions.

== Several cases or alleged cases ==
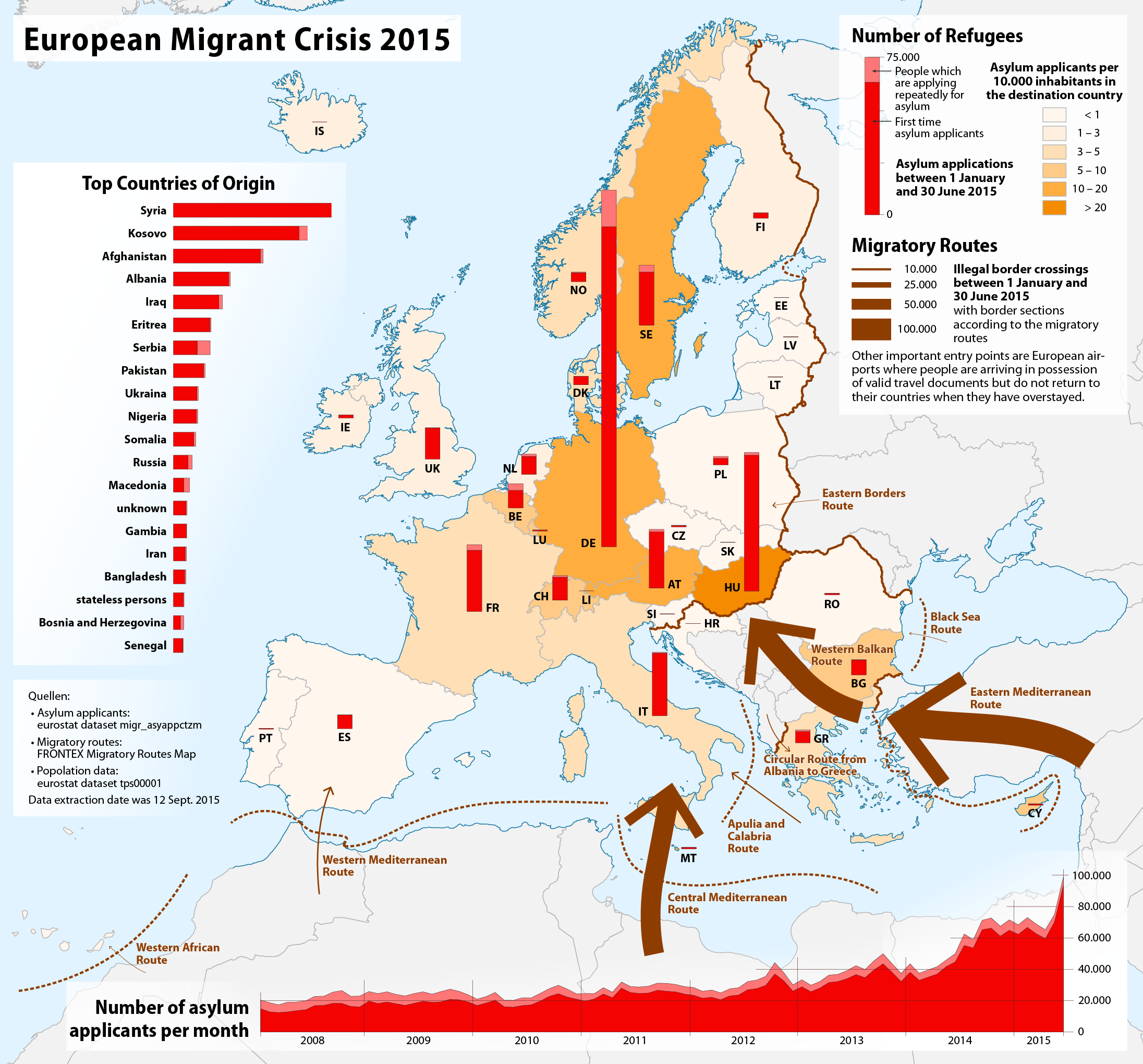
European migrant crisis basis for EU-Turkey Joint Action Plan and Valletta Summit on Migration which ended with an Emergency Trust Fund (€1.8 billion in aid and development assistance of €20 billion every year) to help development of African countries and to take back their migrants.

=== First Libyan Civil War (2011) ===
During the 2011 Libyan civil war, Muammar Gaddafi threatened to "flood" the European Union with migrants if it continued supporting the protesters.

=== Syrian Civil War ===
The Syrian Civil War was a multi-sided civil war in Syria fought from 2011 to 2024, between the Ba'athist Syrian Arab Republic led by then-President Bashar al-Assad, along with domestic and foreign allies, and various domestic and foreign forces opposing both the Syrian government and each other in varying combinations. NATO's four-star General in the United States Air Force commander in Europe stated on the issue of indiscriminate weapons used by Bashar al-Assad, and the non-precision use of weapons by the Russian forces - are the reason which cause refugees to be on the move.

Together, Russia and the Assad regime are deliberately weaponizing migration in an attempt to overwhelm European structures and break European resolve.

— Gen. Philip Breedlove to United States Senate Committee on Armed Services.

=== Morocco ===
Morocco has repeatedly been accused of encouraging thousands of migrants to move to Spain, with the goal on putting pressure on the Spanish government and the European Union in order to obtain political concessions, such as supporting Morocco's territorial claim over Western Sahara, and money. Notable large-scale breaches occurred in 2021 (approximately 8,000 illegal immigrants), and 2026 (approximately 60,000 illegal immigrants).

=== Great Lakes refugee crisis ===
The Great Lakes refugee crisis saw the exodus of over two million Rwandans to neighboring countries of the Great Lakes region of Africa. Many of the refugees were Hutu ethnics fleeing the predominantly Tutsi Rwandan Patriotic Front (RPF), which had gained control of the country at the end of the Rwandan genocide. Reversal of this process is the repatriation of the refugees, which is the process of returning to their place of origin or citizenship. That happened after the First Congo War, when RPF-supported rebels invaded Zaire.

=== South Ossetia ===
The Russo-Georgian War was between Georgia, Russia and the Russian-backed self-proclaimed republics of South Ossetia and Abkhazia. The war took place in August 2008 following a period of worsening relations between Russia and Georgia, both formerly constituent republics of the Soviet Union. The fighting took place in the strategically important Transcaucasia region. Humanitarian impact of the Russo-Georgian War was devastating on the civilians. In the aftermath, ethnic Georgians were expelled from South Ossetia and most of the Georgian villages were razed. Ethnic cleansing of Georgians in South Ossetia was a mass expulsion of ethnic Georgians conducted in South Ossetia and other territories occupied by Russian and South Ossetian forces. According to the 2016 census conducted by the South Ossetian authorities, 3,966 ethnic Georgians remained in the breakaway territory, constituting 7% of the region's total population of 53,532.

Russia is pushing for the international recognition of Abkhazia and South Ossetia (will be satellite states). Abkhazia and South Ossetia are disputed territories in the Caucasus. The central government of Georgia considers the republics under military occupation by Russia. They are partially recognized as independent states by Russia, Venezuela, Nicaragua, and Syria. Russia's initial recognition of the independence of Abkhazia and South Ossetia occurred in the aftermath of the Russo-Georgian War in 2008.

=== Hong Kong ===
83,000 Mainland Chinese with fake identities migrated to Hong Kong during transition from British to Chinese control, they served as Beijing's "invisible hand".

=== Indonesia ===
In 2006, the Indonesian Army manipulated the voyage to Australia of 43 West Papuan asylum seekers in a secret psychological warfare operation. Between 2009 and 2013, more than 50,000 asylum seekers made their way to Australia by boat, with the help of Indonesian transporters. In 2017, it was discovered that Indonesian security forces provided security for immigrant smuggling operations. In 2015, an Indonesia minister warned Australia that Indonesia could release a “human tsunami” of 10,000 asylum seekers to Australia if Canberra continues to agitate for clemency for the death row pair of the Bali Nine.

=== Latin America ===
In an article for Chatham House, Christopher Sabatini argues that Latin American migrants have become a geopolitical weapon, used by state and non-state actors for political leverage and to destabilize target countries.

=== Turkey ===
In February 2016, Erdoğan threatened to send the millions of refugees in Turkey to EU member states, saying: "We can open the doors to Greece and Bulgaria anytime and we can put the refugees on buses ... So how will you deal with refugees if you don't get a deal? Kill the refugees?" In November 2019, again Erdoğan threatened to send millions of refugees in Turkey to EU member states. In late February 2020, migrants started to gather at the Greece–Turkey border after Turkish president Recep Tayyip Erdoğan announced that he would no longer "block" refugees and migrants' "access to the border", and claimed that the border with Greece was "open". Turkey's government was accused of pushing refugees into Europe for political and monetary gain.

=== Belarus (2021–present) ===
President of Belarus Alexander Lukashenko has been accused by Germany and the European Union of weaponising the flow of Middle Eastern refugees into Poland, as revenge for European Union sanctions against his government. On 26 March 2025, after Belorussian and Russian authorities had helped migrants, looking to request asylum in European Union, to cross the heavily fortified border into Poland, president Andrzej Duda signed a law, restricting access to asylum. The law limits the access to asylum for 60 days for foreigners who have entered Poland illegally and is based on an allowance to do so by the EU commission from December 2024. In April 2025, Lukashenko announced a plan to open Belarus to 150,000 migrant workers from Pakistan. Lukashenko's migration plans have raised concerns in Poland.

=== Russia (2023–present) ===
Since 2023, the Finnish government has also accused Russia of deliberately using refugees as weapons as part of its hybrid warfare strategy.

=== United States ===
In 2022, several Republican state governors from states with large immigrant populations sent buses and planes of migrants and asylum seekers to Democratic-controlled states and cities. Accusing President Joe Biden of lax border security, Texas Governor Greg Abbott sent busloads of migrants to Washington, D.C. and New York City. Arizona Governor Doug Ducey also sent migrants to Washington. Florida Governor Ron DeSantis sent a plane of 50 primarily Venezuelan asylum seekers from San Antonio, Texas, to Martha's Vineyard in Massachusetts.

== See also ==
- Self-defence in international law
