= 2026 Ceuta migrant crisis =

Ongoing international incident

- Part of Morocco–Spain relations
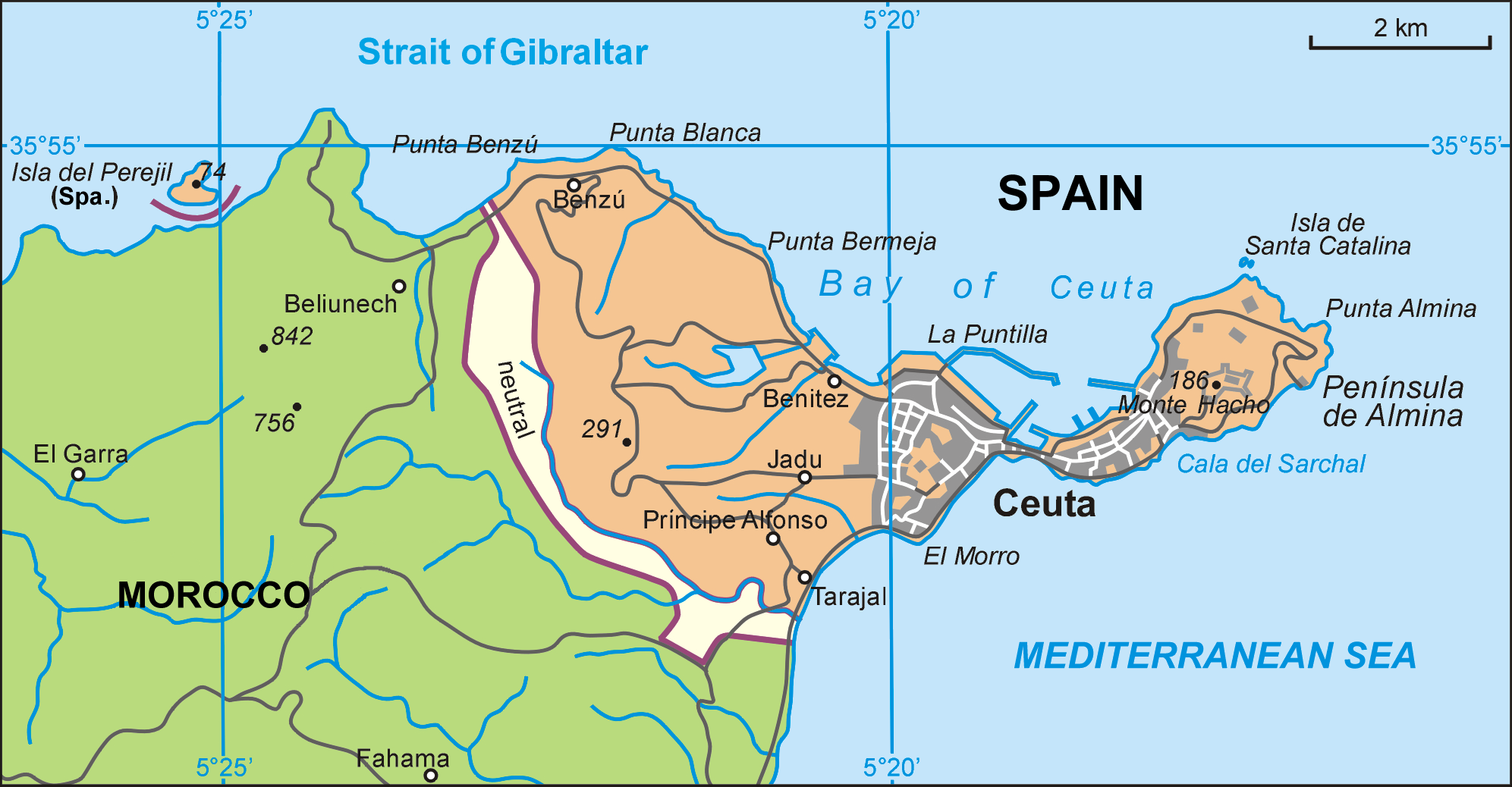
- Map of Ceuta
- Date: 30 July 2026 – present
- Location: Spain; Ceuta (primary incident); Melilla (minor incursion)
- Type: International incident
- Cause: Disputed
- Participants: c. 80,000 migrants
- Deaths: At least 141 in or in the waters around Ceuta, Spain and Fnideq, Morocco

In late July 2026, an estimated 80,000 people, mainly young men originating from Morocco, illegally breached and crossed the border from Morocco into the Spanish autonomous city of Ceuta in North Africa, with smaller numbers attempting to cross to Melilla, another Spanish autonomous city about 400 kilometres (250 mi) away along the Mediterranean coastline. This overwhelmed local reception facilities, and also prompted the government of Ceuta to request that the Spanish government declare a national emergency. Most entered by swimming around the breakwaters of Tarajal and Benzú or by crossing on foot along the shoreline.

The crisis followed the decision in January 2026 by Prime Minister Pedro Sánchez of the PSOE to introduce a mass regularisation programme for migrants who had been living illegally in Spain, including many of Moroccan origin. Sánchez's decision, which the opposition criticised at the time as unconstitutional and unlawful, was later identified by the heads of state from 22 of the EU’s remaining 26 member states as a "pull factor" leading to the Ceuta crisis.

The European Commission stated that those who enter the Spanish cities of Ceuta and Melilla irregularly will not be able to enter mainland Europe through the Schengen Area. However, the Sánchez government said it intended to transfer 500 unaccompanied migrant girls from Ceuta to mainland Spain—ignoring the European Commission.

By 3 August, Spanish government officials said about 70,000 people had voluntarily returned to Morocco. Thousands, largely from sub-Saharan Africa, have been estimated to still be remaining in Ceuta. By 3–4 August, at least 111 migrants were reported to have died as a result of the incident. After initially rejecting offers of operational and legal assistance from the European Union, Spain asked Frontex to assist with the screening of migrants who remained in Ceuta on 28 August. Thousands of migrants, including many children, remained in Ceuta as of early September, causing a crisis in the city. According to Spanish ministers, despite earlier promises, the government plans to welcome "most" of the illegal migrant children to Spain rather than return them.

On 2 September on Ceuta Day, tens of thousands of people across Spain joined mass protests against Sánchez in support of the city of Ceuta.

== Background ==
=== Morocco–Spain border ===
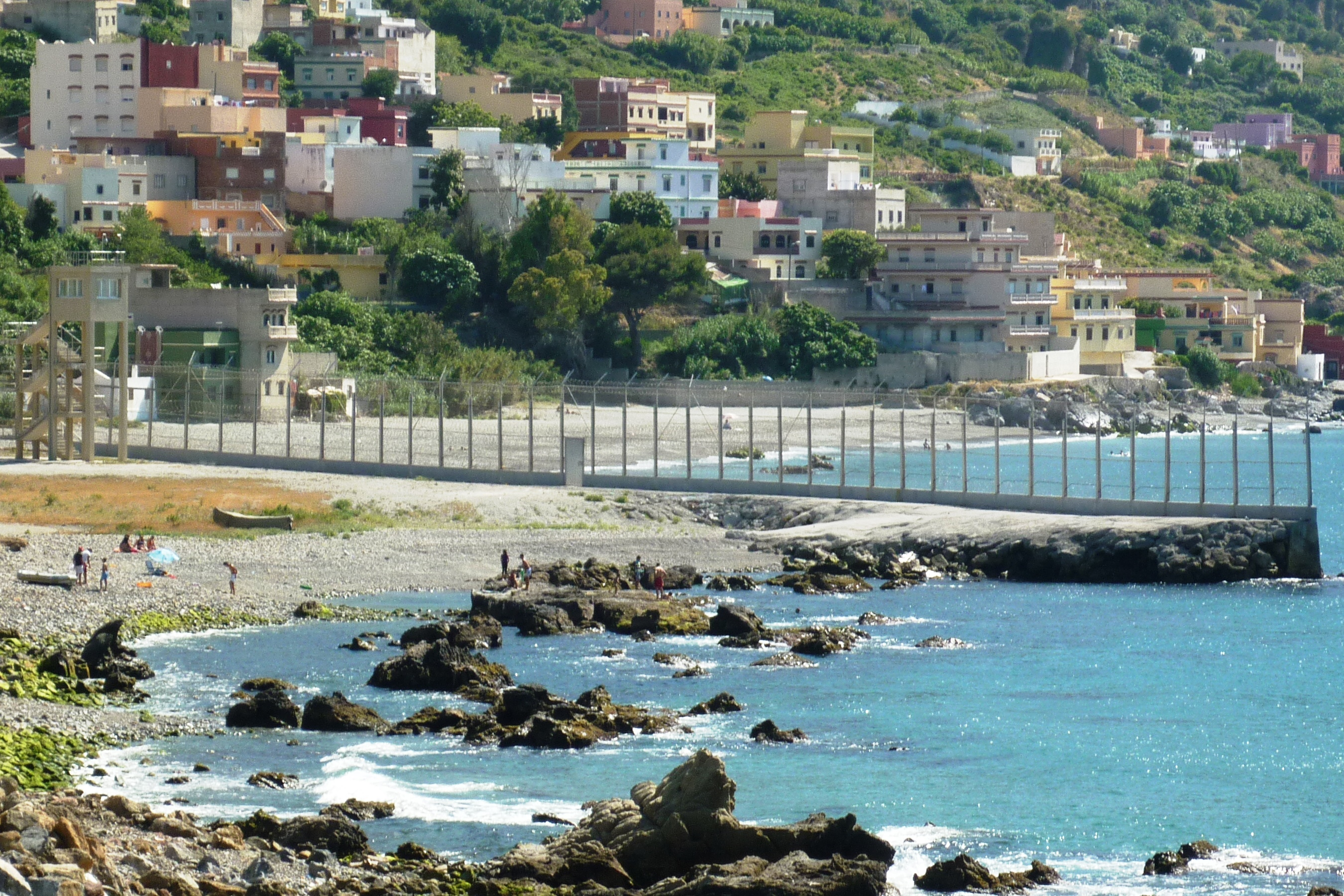
One of the fenced breakwaters in Ceuta in 2012

Ceuta and Melilla are two autonomous cities of Spain located on the north coast of Africa. These Spanish cities (along with Peñón de Vélez de la Gomera) form the European Union's only external land border in Africa. Ceuta and Melilla have a special regime, under which travellers from the cities to mainland Spain and the rest of the Schengen area are subject to border controls. Under a special condition of the Schengen Agreement, border checks are done on exit from the cities – no one can travel from Ceuta or Melilla to mainland Spain without being identified by the National Police at the port or the airport. Morocco claims sovereignty over both cities, while Spain regards them as having been an integral part of its national territory since 1400. Ceuta was conquered by the Portuguese in 1415 and only became a Spanish territory de facto in 1640; that year, Portugal regained its independence from the Spanish crown. Ceuta decided to remain as part of the Spanish kingdom instead of Portugal.

Their location has repeatedly made them focal points for migrant entry into Spain and the wider EU, although in most years the majority of such arrivals to Spain have come via maritime routes to the Canary Islands rather than through Ceuta or Melilla. Practically, the flow of people across the border is controlled by the governments of both Spain and Morocco. Morocco has periodically exerted political pressure on Spain by temporarily increasing the border's permeability, as with a previous migration wave in 2021. Prior to the 2026 incident, it had been suggested that US–Spain tensions and Morocco's growing alignment with the US and Israel created a geopolitical opportunity for Morocco to further assert its claim on the territories.

Moroccans are generally driven to migrate due to dissatisfaction with the country's economy, public services, its politics and governance. A 2024 survey found that 35% of Moroccans wanted to emigrate from the country, with 45% citing economic reasons as the main factor, 18% education opportunities and 15% corruption. Youth unemployment was almost 40% in 2025. Morocco has high levels of inequality, and between 2019 and 2022, inequality and poverty increased. In September and October 2025, large scale youth protests took place over poor public services, socio-economic conditions in the country and corruption. Morocco's politics is dominated by its king and its powerful elite class, and freedom of expression and protest are restricted. Climate change is another major factor. Drought was identified as a major problem by 44% of young Moroccans. North Africa is warming much faster than the average.

=== Prior border incidents ===
The main precedent for the 2026 crisis was the May 2021 border incident, during which around 8,000 people entered Ceuta from over the border within two days, most by swimming around the breakwaters, and among whom were numerous unaccompanied minors. That episode followed a diplomatic crisis triggered by Spain's hospitalisation of Brahim Ghali, secretary-general of the Polisario Front (an armed resistance group to Moroccan occupation of Western Sahara), who was treated in northern Spain (at the Hospital San Pedro in Logroño) for COVID-19; Spain had not issued a prior notice to Morocco. The initially limited response of Moroccan security forces was widely interpreted in Spain as a form of diplomatic pressure. It exposed the limits of Ceuta's reception capacity and Spain's dependence on Moroccan border cooperation.

On 24 June 2022, around 2,000 migrants and asylum seekers gathered in the early hours of the day to cross the Melilla border fence; 23 migrants and asylum seekers were killed after a crowd crush during a conflict with Moroccan and Spanish security forces. Collective attempts to enter by land and sea continued in subsequent years. In August 2024, several hundred people attempted to reach Ceuta by swimming around the breakwaters, taking advantage of fog. The following month, Moroccan authorities deployed a large security operation to prevent a mass crossing that had been organised via social media, which had urged thousands of young people to gather near the border and attempt to enter Spanish territory together. In July 2025, at least 54 unaccompanied minors and around 30 adults reached Ceuta by swimming from Morocco, again exploiting poor visibility.

=== Mass regularisation and Supreme Court ruling ===
In January 2026, Prime Minister Pedro Sánchez of the PSOE announced a mass regularisation programme for migrants who had been living illegally in Spain; more than one million people primarily of Latin American and Moroccan origin subsequently applied, exceeding government projections by roughly a quarter. The move was criticised at the time by the opposition as unconstitutional and unlawful. On 1 August 2026, 22 European Union heads of government, led by the governments of Italy and Denmark, wrote to the European Commission President Ursula von der Leyen, describing Spain's regularisation scheme as a potential "pull factor" contributing to the Ceuta border crisis. On the same day, Sánchez also wrote to EU institutions criticising the positions of governments that had called for Spain to be excluded from the Schengen Area and describing those positions as contrary to European and humanitarian law and the principle of solidarity. On 4 August, European Commissioner for Internal Affairs and Migration Magnus Brunner said that the EU could not see a direct link at that point between Spain's regularisation plan and the events in Ceuta.

The Supreme Court of Spain ruled, on 29 June 2026, that the legal procedure known as summary return ("hot return", regulated under the tenth additional provision of Organic Law 4/2000) could not be applied to migrants intercepted while attempting to reach Ceuta or Melilla by sea, requiring instead the use of the ordinary immigration procedure. The case arose from an Algerian national who had been intercepted at sea in 2024 and handed straight back to Moroccan authorities without the ordinary return procedure being followed. The court found that summary return could only apply to people attempting to breach the physical containment elements of the land perimeters of Ceuta and Melilla, such as border fences, and that surveillance systems like cameras or drones did not by themselves qualify as such barriers.

Minor girl from Morocco making a victory sign after swimming into Ceuta in 28 July 2026. The footage garnered an estimated 32 million views and was cited among the viral videos helping spur the subsequent mass crossings.

In July 2026, many social media posts in Morocco encouraged crossings of the border into Spain and offered practical advice for prospective migrants. False claims that the border was effectively open and misrepresentations of the Spanish Supreme Court ruling circulated widely. Among the footage that circulated widely was a video published by El Faro de Ceuta showing minor girl from Morocco, smiling and making a victory sign after swimming into Ceuta. The footage helping fuel the subsequent mass border crossings. Human smuggling groups exploited the situation, and made offers via posts on Facebook and WhatsApp to help facilitate border crossings.

=== Sánchez's visit to Algeria in July ===
As in 2021, the 2026 Ceuta incident has been linked to the dispute over the political status of Western Sahara. Algeria and Morocco have strained relations because Algeria opposes Morocco's occupation of Western Sahara and supports the Sahrawi Polisario Front independence movement. In 2022, Algeria suspended its friendship treaty with Spain because Spain reversed its decades-long neutrality in the Western Sahara conflict by endorsing Morocco's autonomy proposal for the annexation of the territory. After four years of frozen relations, Spain and Algeria reconciled, with Spanish Prime Minister Pedro Sánchez visiting Algeria on 20 July 2026.

== Course of events ==
=== Rise in sea arrivals ===
In late July 2026, there was a sustained increase in irregular entries into Ceuta from nearby Moroccan localities, often by swimming around the Tarajal and Benzú breakwaters, while some arrived by small boats. Between 20 and 29 July, around 1,500 people arrived in the city, an abnormally high figure for such a short period. The overwhelming majority were young men of Moroccan nationality; however, a few women and Algerian migrants who had previously been in Morocco were also identified, alongside numerous unaccompanied minors and some families with children. Spain's Interior Ministry stated that migrant-smuggling networks had exploited the June Supreme Court ruling to encourage sea crossings. Humanitarian organisations noted that sea crossings had been occurring for months and years beforehand.

On 30 July, Juan Jesús Vivas, the city's mayor-president, requested the Spanish government to declare a national emergency, but was refused by the interior ministry. Reception centres, particularly those for unaccompanied minors, exceeded capacity, leaving thousands of migrants without accommodation. Vivas said facilities for foreign unaccompanied minors were operating at around 2,400% of their ordinary capacity and that roughly a thousand adults remained outside the Temporary Immigrant Reception Centre or had been placed in provisional accommodation. The Civil Guard, National Police Corps, Maritime Safety and Rescue Society and the Spanish Red Cross deployed vessels and assistance teams to rescue people from the water and heat exhaustion, hypothermia and injuries sustained during the crossings.

=== Mass crossing of 30–31 July ===
On 31 July, the Spanish government declared that 49,000 migrants had entered Ceuta within a matter of hours, following several days of sustained arrivals, while Juan Jesús Vivas gave a figure of 60,000. The BBC separately reported officials' estimate of around 49,000 arrivals within 24 hours. Because of the speed and disorder of the crossings, figures were considered provisional and subject to revision. The scale of the crossing changed significantly on the morning of 30 July, when several thousand people gathered on the coast and at crossing points near Ceuta; some swam around the breakwaters, while others crossed on foot through the Tarajal area after passing checkpoints on the Moroccan side. Overnight arrivals continued, with thousands of people also moving towards the Moroccan border town of Fnideq. Press reports described an inconsistent initial response from Moroccan security forces, with some groups passing through monitored areas unhindered before a larger containment operation was mounted. Some migrants reported they had been encouraged to cross into Spain by Moroccan police.

Achraf Maimouni of the Moroccan Association for Human Rights hinted that the border at Tarajal had been opened under "unusual circumstances". Analysts told The New York Times that while the reason for the migration surge was still unclear, the Moroccan government may have felt scorned by Spain's recent overtures to Algeria, amid reports that Moroccan authorities actively encouraged the crossing. Spanish officials denied that Madrid's improving ties with Algeria had damaged its relationship with Morocco. The migrants were predominantly young men. Many arrived by inner tube with their mobile phones zipped in waterproof pouches. Upon reaching the shore, they cheered for Spain and kissed the ground. Given the scale of the entries, the Spanish government ordered Army units already stationed in Ceuta to provide logistical and surveillance support to the Civil Guard while policing duties and direct contact with migrants remained the responsibility of the security forces.

By 2 August, at least 72 had been confirmed dead. Some of them drowned, and some were crushed trying to climb the breakwater with the border fence. Sky News reported that local government officials put the death toll at 86. Various media outlets also reported the discovery of dozens of bodies in the vicinity of the Ceuta coastline and northern Morocco during the preceding weeks, associated with attempts to cross by sea, although not all deaths could be directly linked to the events of the July 2026 crisis. Diving teams from the Civil Guard, Salvamento Marítimo and emergency services continued search operations near the breakwaters, and numerous survivors were treated for exhaustion, injuries and prolonged immersion in the water. Explosions were reported on the Moroccan side of the border. Several arson attacks were reported in Beni Ansar, near the border with Melilla.

=== Melilla ===
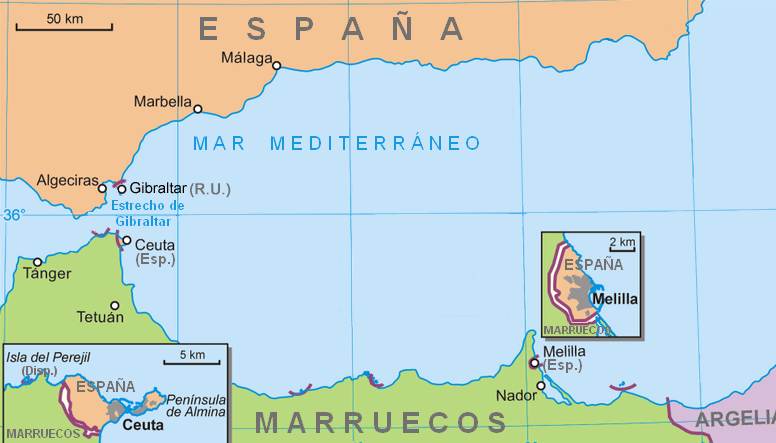
Melilla is located about 225 kilometres (140 mi) to the east of Ceuta.

Migratory pressure also extended to Melilla. On 30 July, groups gathered near Beni Ansar on the Moroccan side of the border and attempted to approach the crossing point and the city's perimeter, prompting clashes with Moroccan security forces trying to prevent a collective entry. The Government Delegation ordered the temporary closure of the Beni Ansar crossing, the only border post still operating between Melilla and Morocco, affecting both vehicle and pedestrian traffic. The switch from July to August is usually a high season for Moroccans residing in Europe who drive south to visit their family for the summer holidays, but the crisis disrupted the strait crossing. Although the pressure was lower than in Ceuta and no comparable mass crossing occurred, the episode prompted reinforced land and maritime surveillance around Melilla.

=== Containment and returns to Morocco ===
Security footage of migrants returning to Morocco

During 31 July, Spain and Morocco reinforced their respective deployments and coordinated measures to prevent further crossings; Moroccan security forces closed access routes towards Fnideq and dispersed crowds near the border, while Spain kept troops, Civil Guard and National Police Corps officers deployed in Ceuta. A return movement to Morocco also began during the day: according to the Spanish government, around half of those who had entered went back voluntarily, in many cases after remaining for hours in Ceuta without accommodation or sufficient resources, with press estimates putting the number of returnees at around 25,000 by the afternoon of 31 July. By evening, the number increased to around 48,300. Many returned to Morocco after not being able to obtain food or water, with supermarkets closed out of fear and Spanish authorities unable or unwilling to provide supplies to most migrants.

The two countries also agreed to speed up identification and returns of those who did not meet the requirements to remain in Spain, though execution of returns remained constrained by the need to follow the ordinary immigration procedure required for people who had arrived by sea.

The Spanish government rejected Ceuta's request to declare a national emergency, arguing that migration does not fall within the legal framework governing such declarations. Instead, it announced additional police deployments and closer coordination with the Moroccan authorities. Interior Minister Fernando Grande-Marlaska travelled to Ceuta to oversee the government's response. The government also said it would examine legal reforms and new physical barriers at the breakwaters to adapt the management of sea crossings to the Supreme Court's ruling, and set up temporary facilities to identify new arrivals, assist asylum seekers and speed up the return of those without legal grounds to remain.

=== Remaining migrants and subsequent investigations ===
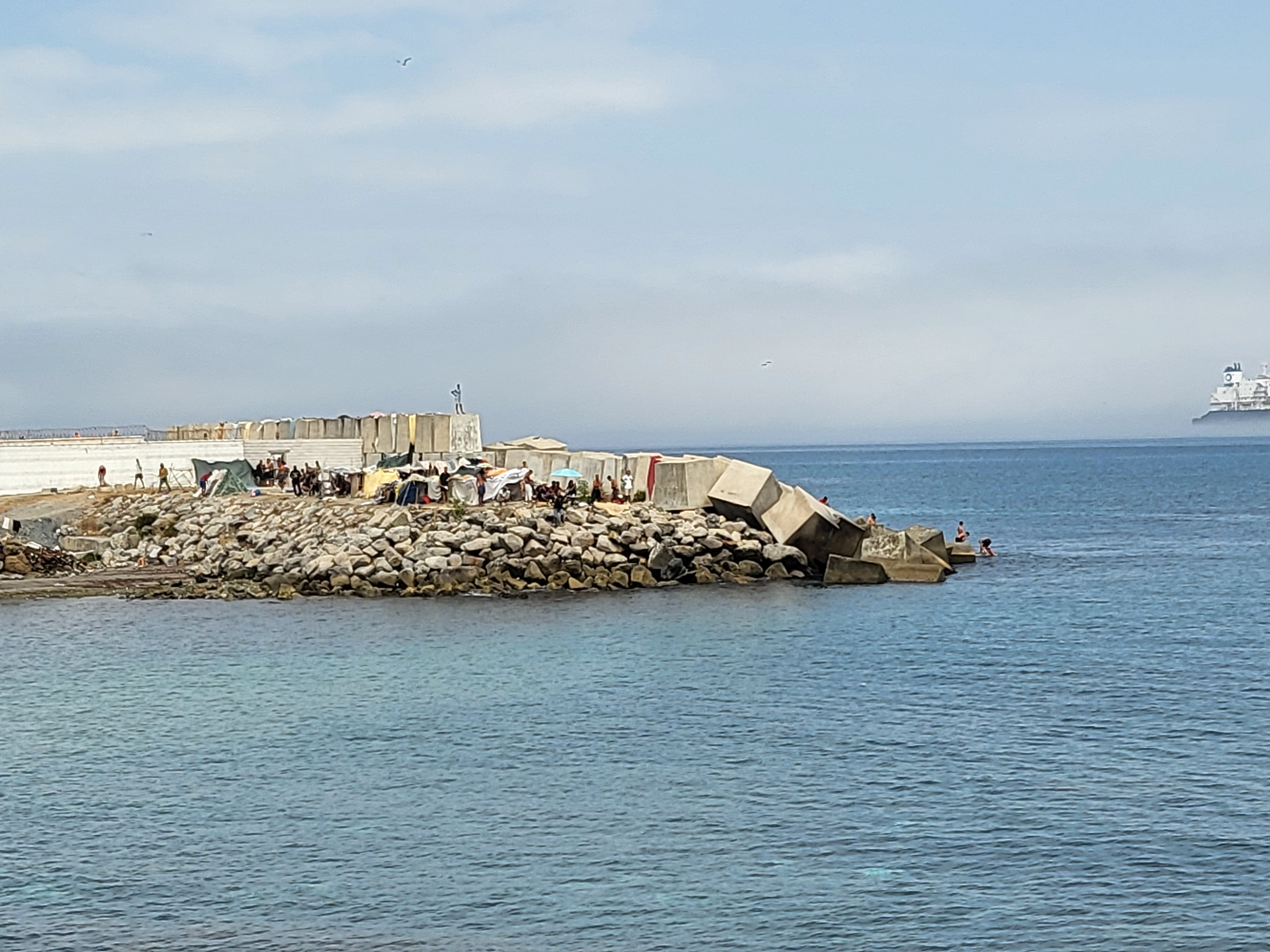
Encampment at Benítez beach breakwater

While the majority of the estimated 80,000 who arrived in Spain were returned to Morocco in the days following the crisis, it was estimated that 3,000–5,000 illegal migrants remained in Ceuta as of 4 August. The remaining group consisted largely of men from Sub-Saharan Africa, who refused to leave and set up camp on the beach in Ceuta. It also included 862 migrant minors who have special protection from deportation. This led Ceuta authorities to declare that their migrant processing centres had "collapsed".

On 29 July, it was reported that the authorities had begun transferring some migrants from Ceuta to mainland Spain and that the first group of 39, mostly Sudanese, migrants had already been moved to Algeciras in Andalusia.

The following humanitarian crisis in the hosting facilities have led to putting under risk of violence women and children. It was noted that other children may be at risk due to a lack of space in children's homes, forcing many to sleep outdoors. On 15 August, the Civil Guard announced that they were investigating among migrants 15 alleged rapes, including one of a 10-year-old girl by three males. They also announced the arrest of a man with prior offences for terrorism. The University Hospital of Ceuta reported at least five migrant girls arrived with injuries suggesting prior sexual assault.

Ceuta's chief prosecutor, Silvia Rojas, reported that 23 sexual assaults, including nine against children, has been recorded in Ceuta since the mass migrants influx at the end of July, amounting to almost one case a day. Rojas said migrant girls are particularly vulnerable due to their irregular status in the territory, and that the surge in arrivals has led to a sharp rise in sexual assaults, with many victims reluctant to report attack out of fear or due to their precarious status in the city. Suspects identified include four Moroccan nationals, three Spaniards and one Belgium national. The Spanish society of Epidemiology said the crisis had exposed the difficulty in identifying and addressing violence against migrant women and girls. A 24 year old Moroccan woman told the BBC she had "put her life in danger" by travelling to Ceuta, describing being sexually assaulted while sleeping among a group of men and women, and said she would not have come had she known.

On 19 August, the Spanish government announced plans to transfer 500 unaccompanied migrant girls from Ceuta to mainland Spain. On 21 August, the government said it considered the transfer feasible within a few weeks. On 31 August, Minister for Youth and Children Sira Rego said that 500 particularly vulnerable girls could be transferred through agreements with childcare organisations and accommodated in small centres in different parts of mainland Spain, but that the plan required the consent of the government of Ceuta. By early September, the transfer had not taken place and the government was still seeking to secure authorisation from Ceuta.

Residents started to protest against the handling of the crisis in August 2026, citing security concerns and demanding a removal of the remaining migrants. On 27 August 2026 violent protesters set fire to migrant makeshift shelters on the beach, while 50 individuals blocked Red Cross aid from being delivered at Trampolín Beach. Ultimately police had to separate protestors and migrants. At the time, it was reported that the Spanish government estimated between 3,500 and 7,000 migrants were still in Ceuta. However, the president of Ceuta Juan Jesús Vivas estimated that over 10,000 illegal migrants remained in the enclave representing 15% of the population and demanded that they return them "in accordance with the law".

By early September 2026 Spanish police had conducted several ID checks and identified 10 Islamists among the remaining migrants in Ceuta, who had previously been deported from Spain. On 2 September, immigrants pulled a baby dolphin out of the water and beat it to death with a stick, with several people taking part. The incident was reported by the Association for the Defense of Urban Trees, Biodiversity, and the Environment (DAUBMA). On 25 September, three Moroccan immigrants were arrested for allegedly kidnapping two immigrant girls.

While originally most migrants arriving in Ceuta had given an economic motivation for their attempted move to the European Union, reasons stated in requests for asylum in the enclave by mid October 2026 had shifted and some 70% of the claimants stated to be in danger of persecution for being lesbian or gay. ABC reporters stated police sources who suspected migrants had learned via social media, or had been tutored by NGO's, about higher rates of success if a persecution for sexual orientation is claimed.

== Reactions and analysis ==
Writing in El País, Carmen Morán Breña summarised the kaleidoscope of reactions in Ceuta and more widely in Spain: "Taxi drivers called it an invasion; NGOs described it as a humanitarian crisis; local politicians faced with handling the situation labelled it a national emergency." Video of the incident at the beachhead was rapidly shared worldwide, and triggered wider commentary from across Europe, as well as in other countries.

=== Spain ===
==== Ceuta ====
Ceuta's mayor-president, Juan Jesús Vivas, initially described the situation as a "humanitarian and social emergency" and warned that the city's public resources could not sustain the increasing pace of arrivals. He called on the Spanish government to declare a "national emergency", establish a single command structure and immediately send police, military and humanitarian resources, arguing the crisis exceeded Ceuta's ordinary capacities. After meeting Prime Minister Pedro Sánchez on 31 July, Vivas reiterated that Ceuta needed a structural response rather than emergency measures alone; while he thanked the government for additional resources, he said the reaction had come only once the city's services were already overwhelmed, and sought guarantees against a repeat of the situation. Vivas also laid blame for the crossings with Morocco, stating: "It is impossible for 60,000 people to enter without the approval of the Moroccan government. We have been mistreated and held in contempt."

Public reaction in Ceuta was tense. Sánchez's visit was met by protests near the heliport and the seat of the city assembly, with the prime minister greeted by boos and chants calling for his resignation and declaring that "Ceuta is not for sale". The protests reflected frustration over the perceived slowness of the central government's response, the strain on public services, and the presence of thousands of migrants sleeping in the streets; tensions between residents and migrant groups near the city hall required local police intervention to prevent confrontations, and several public events, including part of the city's annual fair (1–8 August), were suspended because of the crisis. Most shops had closed due to uncertainty, but opened partially on 2 August. On 1 August, visits by mainlander far-right MEP Alvise Pérez and neo-Nazi group National November were met with protests by Ceutans claiming for unity and coexistence. Pérez took shelter in a bar as residents banged on its windows, and police later escorted him away.

==== Government ====
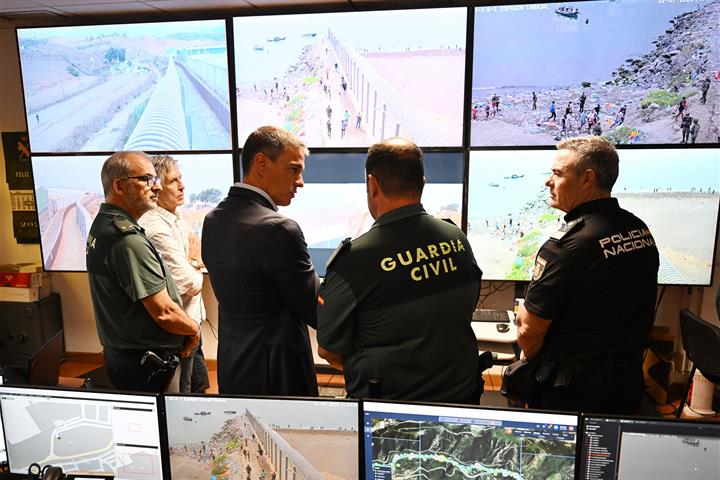
Pedro Sánchez, with representatives of law enforcement at the Tarajal border

While Prime Minister Pedro Sánchez's government had previously positioned itself as permissive on immigration, Sánchez promised "an immediate response to the situation in Ceuta". On 31 July, Sánchez and Interior Minister Grande-Marlaska travelled to Ceuta, visiting the Tarajal crossing and holding a coordination meeting with Vivas, the government delegate, regional heads of the Civil Guard and National Police, and representatives of reception services and the Spanish Red Cross.

Sánchez described the mass entry as an "attack" and a "violation of Spain's territorial integrity", and said the state would use every available means to restore control of the border. He partly attributed the mobilisation of migrants to smuggling networks that he said had spread a self-serving interpretation of the Supreme Court's recent ruling on sea-crossing returns. At the same time, the government defended its cooperation with Morocco and avoided directly blaming Morocco for facilitating the crossings, with Sánchez saying communication with Morocco had been fluid and that Moroccan forces had subsequently acted to halt further gatherings near Ceuta and Melilla. The prime minister lashed out at fellow EU heads of state who blamed his extraordinary regularisation program for illegal migrants, saying it had driven the crossings. Sánchez also rejected comparisons with Spain's migration policies, noting that unauthorised migration into Spain had been lower over the previous five years than in Italy and Greece. Sánchez rejected the criticism and argued on X that Italy had received significantly more migrants than Spain since 2021, citing approximately 478,000 undocumented migrants arriving in Italy as opposed to 234,000 in Spain. Italian Foreign Minister Antonio Tajani noted in response that in Italy, "Irregular sea arrivals as of July 15, 2026, were 15,323, down 54 percent from 2025 and 50 percent from 2024." Following Italy's decision to reintroduce temporary border controls on travellers arriving from Spain, the Spanish government criticised the measure as contrary to European interests and solidarity, noting that Italy had recorded higher numbers of irregular crossings than Spain in recent years.

Juan Fernando López Aguilar, Spanish S&D MEP and former justice minister, argued that criticism of Spain's migration policies was opportunistic, claiming that right-wing forces increasingly portray migrants as a threat and are marginalising the humanitarian approach promoted by governments such as that of Sánchez. The Spanish government criticised other countries in response to comments following the incident. It rejected Italian statements and summoned Italy's ambassador to Madrid. Foreign Minister José Manuel Albares called the Italian government's remarks inappropriate. Óscar Puente suggested Israel was involved in the Ceuta incident, saying in response to an Israeli government post about the incident that it was "all starting to become quite clear". Gabriel Rufián, the parliamentary spokesperson for the Republican Left of Catalonia, stated that the crisis served interests of the United States and Israel by "blackmailing" Spain and Europe under the Moroccan government. In an attempt to relieve the Ceuta facilities, a Spanish government delegation ordered a shipment of 39 migrants to be brought to Algeciras on mainland Spain on 29 July 2026. Sumar's deputy Nahuel González demanded that Spain not co-host the 2030 FIFA World Cup with Morocco in retaliation for the crisis in Ceuta, stating that Morocco "uses desperate people for its own geostrategic interests". Subsequently, the coalition formally presented a proposal for Spain not to host the World Cup jointly with Morocco.

The Italian decision to suspend Schengen with Spain due to Sánchez's failure to secure the border, contributed to a rapid deterioration in relations between Rome and Madrid. The Spanish government rejected the suggestion that Spain had failed to protect the European border and argued that migrants in Ceuta could not simply travel onward to mainland Spain without undergoing identification and other controls. Spanish officials also disputed Italian criticism of Spain's migration policies and argued that the Italian restrictions were disproportionate. Spain subsequently introduced reciprocal checks on travellers arriving from Italy, producing a diplomatic dispute in which two major EU member states temporarily reintroduced internal border controls against one another. Although temporary internal border controls are permitted under EU law in exceptional circumstances, the extensive use of such controls has long been regarded as a potential threat to the principle of free movement.

For the 862 unaccompanied minors, still present in Ceuta on 3 August, only 29 child-specific accommodations could be provided by the local government. El País reported the majority will therefore be transported to the Spanish mainland, as they are entitled to by law. On 4 August 2026, prior to an emergency meeting of EU interior ministers, Spanish government officials claimed no migrants would be able to travel from Ceuta to mainland Spain. The Ministry of Youth and Children announced an emergency allocation of €25 million to Ceuta for migrant minors. A communications officer at the National Security Department was fired by the government after she published a message reporting the number of migrants who had entered Ceuta, a figure the government had not yet acknowledged and was still treating the situation as a minor crisis.

In late August 2026, Spanish prime minister said that Israel and Russia undertook a covert social media influence campaign to spread disinformation on the crisis. Both countries denied the accusations, and Russia urged Sánchez to present evidence for his allegations.

==== Opposition ====
The People's Party blamed the government for reacting too late and linked the crisis to its migration policy and the deterioration of relations with Morocco, calling for greater diplomatic pressure on Morocco, a permanent reinforcement of the Ceuta and Melilla borders, and a review of regularisation policy. Santiago Abascal of the Vox party accused Sánchez of having orchestrated the "invasion" to keep himself in power; the Vox party demanded a total border closure, immediate returns and mobilisation of the armed forces. Other parties criticised this framing and called for a distinction between border protection and the humanitarian care owed to migrants, particularly minors. Later, Vox presented a motion to exclude Morocco as a co-host of the 2030 FIFA World Cup, stating that Morocco offers no security guarantees and uses weaponized migration as a means of coercion.

The head of the police union for Spain's Civil Guard called the situation "absolute chaos". Isabel Díaz Ayuso, president of the Community of Madrid, posted on X, saying, "Sánchez allows Spain to be invaded through Ceuta." The Objective, a Spanish news site, claimed that the government had been warned of possible mass border crossings by Spanish intelligence services days prior to the events, but failed to act.

==== Other ====
In September 2026, footballers from nearly all La Liga clubs wore t-shirts in the pre-match warm-up bearing the slogan "Todos somos caballas" ("We are all Ceutans"); fans of Real Madrid also organised a display of Ceuta's coat of arms in the Bernabéu stadium ahead of the team's UEFA Champions League fixture with Inter Milan on 8 September.

=== Ceuta Day public protests ===
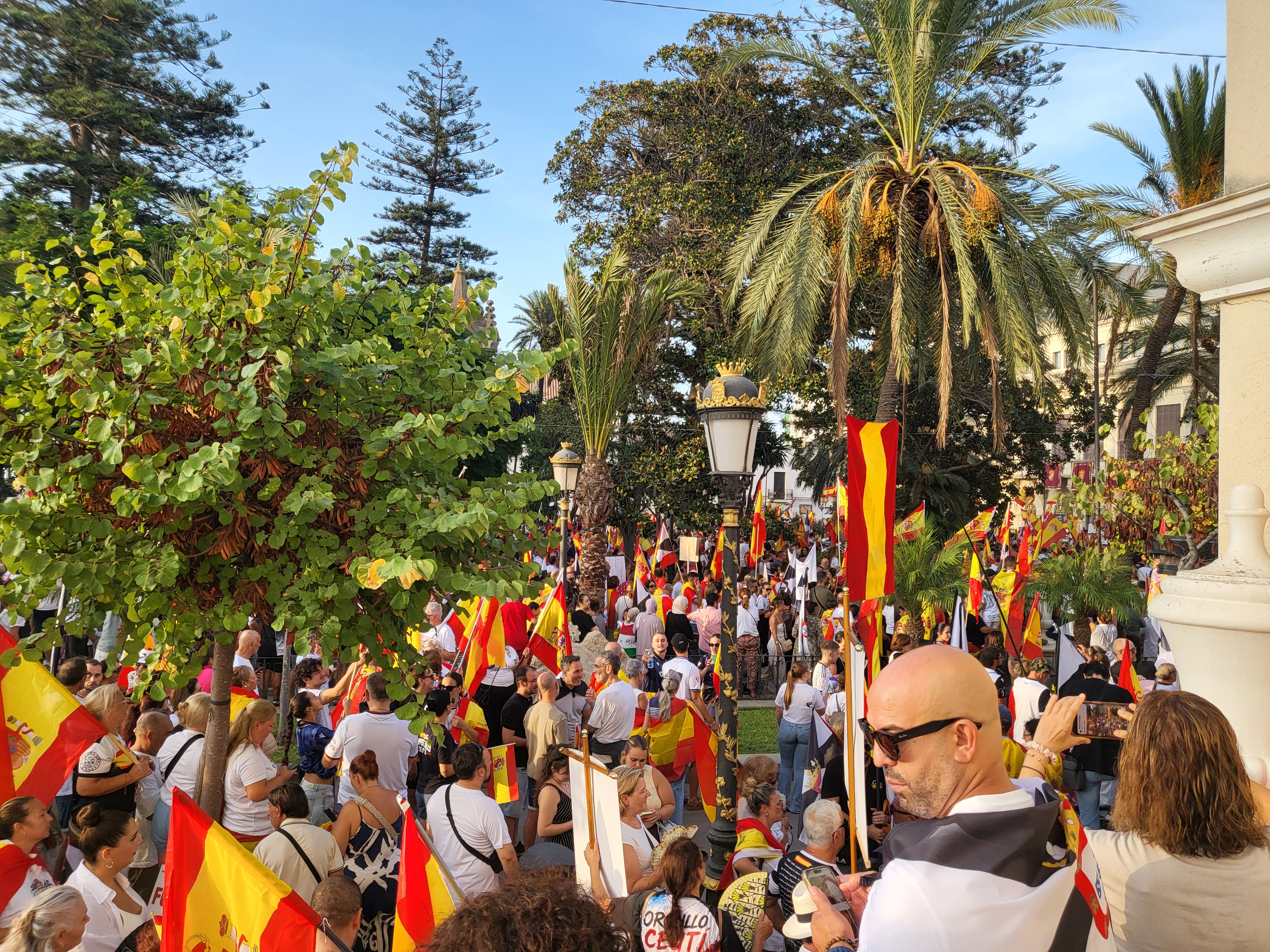
Demonstrations of support in Ceuta

On 2 September, usually celebrated as Ceuta Day, mass demonstrations were held across Spain in solidarity with Ceuta against the Sánchez government. Protests were held across Spain with hundreds of thousands of Spanish citizens protesting responding to a call by the nonpartisan Spanish Federation of Municipalities and Provinces. Protesters demanded accountability from Sánchez and his government because of their responsibility in creating the crisis with many calling for his resignation or prosecution.

Protests in cities across the country included Ceuta where around 20,000 citizens participated. In Madrid alone, around 50,000 citizens took part in the protest. In Valencia, there were around 25,000 protestors. In Malaga, local police estimated that there were between 120,000 and 140,000 citizens participating in the protest. In total, protests were held in over 200 towns and cities across Spain.

On 26 September, A right-wing demonstration in Madrid over the migrant crisis draws tens of thousands of people.

=== Morocco ===
Moroccan authorities reinforced police deployments around Fnideq and Beni Ansar and used riot-control equipment to disperse crowds and prevent further crossing attempts. Morocco's ambassador to Spain expressed regret over the events and said his country supported legal and orderly migration.

The Moroccan government denied having deliberately encouraged or tolerated the mass entry, attributing it instead to smuggling networks, rumours circulating about an alleged relaxation of border controls, and the interpretation of the Spanish Supreme Court's ruling. Several analysts nonetheless pointed to the purported initial passivity of some Moroccan forces, arguing it was unfeasible for the Moroccan government to be unaware of such mass movements of people, and they linked the crisis to wider tensions in relations between Spain, Morocco and Algeria.

=== European Union ===
==== Calls to suspend Spain from Schengen ====
Following the crisis, members of the European Council made calls for Spain to be suspended from Schengen. Italy's prime minister Giorgia Meloni called for Spain to be suspended from the EU's visa-free Schengen Area, claiming that "uncontrolled illegal immigration poses a real threat to the security of Europe's borders" on X. Domestically, she received support from her governing coalition, including Deputy Prime Minister Matteo Salvini, the leader of Lega. Foreign Minister Antonio Tajani, the leader of Forza Italia, also supported Meloni's call for Spain to be suspended from Schengen while blaming the crisis on Sánchez's left-wing migration policy.

The governments of Finland, the Czech Republic, Sweden, Denmark, and Austria supported Meloni's call to suspend Spain from Schengen. Finland's interior minister Mari Rantanen wrote on X that "Spain has completely failed to protect the Schengen Area's external border from infiltration. This cannot continue. All European countries must support Meloni's proposal. Countries that do not fulfill their obligation to protect the external border cannot be members of Schengen." Sweden's prime minister Ulf Kristersson called on the Spanish government to regain control of its border and stated that Sweden was "prepared to take the measures required to safeguard order and control". He also expressed a willingness to suspend Schengen with Spain "to ensure that 2015 does not happen again".

Denmark's prime minister Mette Frederiksen backed Meloni's call for Spain to be suspended, providing Agence France-Presse with the statement, "It goes without saying that the EU must immediately take all necessary measures and consider all options, including a suspension of Schengen cooperation. Uncontrolled immigration poses a threat to Europe and to Denmark." Austrian chancellor Christian Stocker criticised Spain's migration policies, arguing that regularisations encouraged illegal migration, and warned that Austria could temporarily close its Schengen borders if migration pressure increased. Austria's family minister Claudia Bauer accused Spain of "effectively handing out entry tickets to the European Union" and stated that the Austrian government backed Meloni's stance. Germany, Belgium, and the Netherlands were among other Schengen countries that called on Spain to guarantee control of the EU's external border. Malta also joined in with the EU group and requested border measures to safeguard Schengen. By 4 August, Italy and Portugal had deployed police officers in the port of Ceuta. They assisted Spanish National Police in inspecting travellers boarding ferries to Algeciras.

A letter signed by 22 European Union heads of government accused Spain of creating a "pull factor" for migrants by implementing a mass regularisation scheme. Describing the events as a threat to the Schengen open travel area, the leaders called for emergency talks and asserted their readiness to reinforce or reintroduce "temporary border controls" against Spain. The letter was led by Italy and Denmark, and additionally signed by the leaders of Austria, Belgium, Bulgaria, Croatia, Cyprus, the Czech Republic, Denmark, Estonia, Finland, Greece, Hungary, Latvia, Lithuania, Malta, the Netherlands, Poland, Romania, Slovakia, Slovenia and Sweden.

==== Suspension of Schengen with Spain ====
On 31 July 2026, Italy announced that it would temporarily suspend the application of Schengen free-movement arrangements to travellers arriving from Spain by air and sea. The measure was initially announced for one month and involved targeted and selective checks on non-EU nationals rather than a general closure of the Italian-Spanish border. As of end of August 2026 the block is still in place. EU citizens, including Spanish citizens, were not subject to the same restrictions.

The Italian government justified the decision on security and migration grounds. Foreign Minister Antonio Tajani argued that the scale of the Ceuta crossings represented a threat to the integrity of the Schengen system and that Italy had a responsibility to prevent irregular migrants from subsequently moving through Europe. The government also supported strengthening controls along Italy's land border with France.

==== European Commission ====
European Commission president Ursula von der Leyen described the images from Ceuta as "unacceptable", expressed the Commission's support for Spain, and called for an immediate end to illegal crossings, offering operational and financial assistance and saying the Commission was in contact with both Spanish and Moroccan authorities. European Commissioner for Migration and Home Affairs Magnus Brunner said the Ceuta border was also an external border of the European Union and offered support from Frontex to reinforce surveillance, register migrants and assist with returns, while noting that Ceuta and Melilla have a particular status within the Schengen area and that entry into the autonomous cities does not automatically grant access to continental Europe. Von der Leyen urged Spain to fully re-establish control of the border and ensure rapid identification, asylum and return procedures, while respecting EU law and the special protection owed to minors.

==== Other EU countries ====
Former Portuguese Secretary of State for European Affairs and political commentator Bruno Maçães stated on X that the United States and Israel were "deeply involved and intensely active" in using the incident to criticise Sánchez's government. The party LIVRE urged the Prime Minister not to host the 2030 FIFA World Cup alongside Morocco, claiming it "lacks both the capacity and the trustworthiness" to organise the event. LIVRE pointed to the crisis as a violation of international law by Morocco, characterising it as an "exploitation of Moroccan citizens" and an attack on the Spanish border, in addition to the "decades of systematic human rights violations against its own people, the denial of self-determination, and the violent repression of the Sahrawi people".

On 31 July, France reimposed checks at its border crossings with Spain in response to the crisis, because of concerns expressed in an announcement made by French Interior Minister Laurent Nuñez that some migrants might move on to other European states. Emmanuel Macron, President of France, expressed solidarity with Pedro Sánchez and Spain, offering French and European support, including assistance from Frontex, while stressing the need to protect the EU's external borders. Macron also announced reinforced French border controls with Spain and praised cooperation with Morocco on returns. Marine Le Pen and Jordan Bardella, leaders of the National Rally, criticised Spain's migration policies, accusing the government of encouraging illegal migration and calling for stronger border controls. Le Pen urged France to reinforce its borders and restrict Schengen free movement to EU nationals, while Bardella warned that Ceuta represented a potential future scenario for Europe if migration policies were not changed, calling for tougher measures and questioning Spain's Schengen membership. Sarah Knafo, French European Parliament member from Reconquête, argued that migrants were making calculated decisions rather than arriving randomly, claiming they were aware of the benefits offered by European migration policies and were influenced by the incentives created by them.

Germany expressed solidarity with Spain and called for a coordinated European response. Chancellor Friedrich Merz urged Spain to quickly restore control of Ceuta, stressing that protecting the European Union's external borders was essential to combating illegal migration. He also called on Morocco to immediately implement return agreements and welcomed EU support through Frontex. Interior Minister Alexander Dobrindt called for continued internal border controls due to ongoing migration pressure and urged Spain to secure the EU's external border and return migrants who entered illegally. Foreign Minister Johann Wadephul emphasised cooperation with Morocco to ensure border security and the rapid return of migrants, while CDU/CSU lawmaker Günter Krings warned that Europe needed stricter enforcement of returns to weaken human-smuggling networks.

In Germany, Alice Weidel, co-chair of the Alternative for Germany party, stated that borders "must now be closed" and "rejections rigorously enforced", before adding that the 2015 European migrant crisis "must not repeat itself!" Moreover, she called for stronger border controls, warning that Schengen could be suspended if necessary. Other German politicians also reacted to the crisis. Johannes Volkmann, a CDU member of the Bundestag, criticised the Spanish government's handling of the situation and warned that failure to return migrants could undermine public support for Europe's open-border system. Clara Bünger, the Left Party's spokesperson on domestic policy, called for EU support for Spain through humanitarian assistance, accommodation and asylum procedures, arguing that responsibility should not fall only on countries located at the EU's external borders. Sebastian Fiedler, an SPD member of the Bundestag's Interior Committee, said the main concern was the "signaling effect" of migration routes appearing successful and supported additional EU assistance through Frontex.

=== Other countries ===
Argentine President Javier Milei, a staunch opponent of Prime Minister Sánchez, posted images supposedly showing people in Ceuta carrying out citizen's arrests of migrants and handing them over to the police. Milei added that "when the people wake up, the end of socialism gets closer. Keep it up, Spain!" Karina Milei, a sister of President Milei and the General Secretariat of the Presidency of Argentina, defended the position taken by Italian Prime Minister Giorgia Meloni and reposted a statement by Meloni, further stating on X that "what happens in Spain proves us to be right, as expressed by Meloni. We have to defend our homeland." Milei's comments come amid an executive order by her brother cracking down on immigration in Argentina, further deteriorating relations between Argentina and Spain.

British Prime Minister Andy Burnham spoke to Pedro Sánchez and offered help with the situation. In response to the events, Burnham promised to be "relentless" in restricting small boat arrivals into the UK, also commenting that the country would need to stay in regular dialogue with the EU on this issue. Nigel Farage, leader of the party Reform UK, criticised Spain's migration policies, arguing they encouraged illegal migration and warning that similar situations could spread to the United Kingdom and Europe, calling for stricter border controls and describing the crisis as a broader challenge for European security and governance.

==== Israel ====
Israel's Permanent Representative to the United Nations, Danny Danon, said that Spain "never misses an opportunity to lecture Israel" and claimed that it had declared a state of emergency in Ceuta because of its immigration policies. He added that, before continuing to criticise Israel, Spain should explain "why it still maintains colonial enclaves in Africa". Spanish Minister Óscar Puente suggested Israel was involved in the Ceuta incident, in response to this statement. Israel's Ambassador to Spain Dana Erlich later issued a statement saying, "The comment made by Israel's Ambassador to the UN on the issue does not represent the position of the State of Israel."

Israeli minister of national security Itamar Ben-Gvir mocked Spain on X, sarcastically congratulating Prime Minister Sánchez and Spain for their "deep commitment to welcoming immigration and 'human diversity'." Ben-Gvir also urged Spain to welcome Gazans who request refugee status in Spain, linking the Spanish government to having sympathy for Hamas. Israel and Morocco have been close politically, with Israel being one of the few countries to recognise Morocco's claim on Western Sahara, while Prime Minister Sánchez has been a vocal critic of Israel's Gaza war.

==== United States ====
President of the United States Donald Trump said that when he saw what had happened in Spain, he thought that "it would be a topic of discussion for our November elections", adding that thousands of people are "invading (Spain) due to weak laws, a bad government, and too left politics." A spokesperson for the US government stated that President Trump has repeatedly warned European countries about implementing "far-left and globalist" immigration policies, calling Spain's immigration policies "destructive" and warning about civilisation crises in Europe. Vice President JD Vance presented the crisis as a consequence of mass migration and criticised what he described as "radical left-wing globalist" immigration policies. Senator Ted Cruz accused "the socialist prime minister of Spain" of granting amnesty to millions of military-age men coming from Africa, adding that "the left hates the West and actively works to destroy it."

Former officials of previous US administrations, including Mark Levin and Michael Rubin, condemned Spain for its immigration policies. In March 2026, Rubin had written that "Morocco should send a new Green March into Ceuta and Melilla", in reference to the government-coordinated incursion of Western Sahara in 1975 by around 350,000 Moroccans. The US reaction comes amid a background of strained Spain-US relations under Sánchez and Trump, with clashes over Sánchez's criticism of Israel and opposition to the US−Israeli attacks on Iran. In April 2026, the US House Appropriations Committee stated that the "Spanish-administered cities of Ceuta and Melilla are located in Moroccan territory", while approving $40 million in security and military financing to Morocco. The US has long supported Morocco, with the Trump administration working to advance Morocco's Western Sahara autonomy proposal. On 6 August 2026, US State Department spokesman Tommy Pigott stated that his country "unequivocally supports Spain's sovereignty over Ceuta and Melilla", and that the congressional report was not part of US law. Pigott blamed the crisis on "the Spanish government's refusal to defend their sovereignty, secure their borders, and protect their people".

=== Other ===
The Polisario Front, an organization advocating for the independence of the disputed Western Sahara territory, stated through its representative to the UN, Sidi Mohamed Omar, that Morocco has "long weaponised migrant influx for political blackmailing and regional destabilisation." He added that the issue shows "internal sociopolitical tensions" in Morocco, further stating that Morocco is an "autocratic country" that deprives its citizens of rights and uses them as "cannon fodder to blackmail and destabilise neighbours." Another official of the Polisario Front, Abdullah Arabi, wrote an opinion piece for El Confidencial, urging Spain to "stop ignoring the deep disagreements and recurrent tensions with Morocco", adding that Morocco is not "a strategic ally for Spain" and echoing the Polisario Front's position that Morocco has "historically weaponised immigration" against Spain.

The Riffian National Party directly accused the Moroccan government and held it responsible for the crisis, ruling out a spontaneous situation and describing it as a "deliberate criminal policy". The party also questioned European funding for Morocco, arguing that rather than helping to prevent migration, it ends up funding a government that uses migration as a tool to exert diplomatic pressure.

UNICEF expressed particular concern over the high number of unaccompanied minors and called for them to be identified and housed separately from adults in appropriate facilities, and protected from potential trafficking or exploitation.

Save the Children called for urgent registration of any unaccompanied minors in Ceuta, particularly highlighting the plight of girls. They called for authorities to transfer minors throughout mainland Spain to "alleviate the pressure on the city's protection system and guarantee adequate care for all minors."

=== Public commentary and conspiracy theories ===
Commentators across the political spectrum including Hasan Piker and Candace Owens published accusations that Israel orchestrated the migrant crisis in Ceuta. According to an analysis published by The Guardian, some of these narratives, described by media analysts as antisemitic conspiracy theories, have been linked to Russian bots, which were also linked to propagating Islamophobic and white nationalist conspiracy theories about the border crossings being part of the Great Replacement and white genocide plots. Speculation about possible Israeli involvement was also voiced by some Spanish commentators and political figures. An Associated Press fact check reported claims that US President Donald Trump and Israel had encouraged Morocco to facilitate the migrant crossings as retaliation for Spain's positions on the war in Gaza and the 2026 Iran war, but found no evidence of US or Israeli involvement.

As for the claim that Morocco intentionally opened the border, the Associated Press fact check noted that Spain initially said Moroccan officials tried to stop migrants. However, these efforts proved ineffective, and a freelance photographer working for Associated Press reported seeing thousands of migrants proceeding unhindered, with Moroccan officials passively standing by. Morocco did subsequently deploy tear gas and other crowd control measures to disperse migrants. In November 2026, Spain's National Intelligence Centre (CNI) reported to the National Court that it had found no evidence that the migrant crossings had been instigated, planned or coordinated by Moroccan authorities. The agency instead attributed the surge to viral calls on social media, finding no identifiable organiser or connection to the Moroccan state. A separate investigation by the Civil Guard reached similar conclusions, reporting that Moroccan security forces had demonstrated a willingness to contain the crossings.

== See also ==
- 2014 Ceuta border incident
- 2021 Morocco–Spain border incident
- 2022 Melilla border incident
- Green March
- Immigration to Europe
- Immigration to Spain
- Migration and asylum policy of the European Union
- Migration diplomacy
- Weaponized migration § Morocco
