= Mülheim – Essen I =

Federal electoral district of Germany

117 Mülheim – Essen I
- Electoral district for the Bundestag
- Mülheim – Essen I in 2025
- State: North Rhine-Westphalia
- Population: 253,200 (2019)
- Electorate: 182,895 (2021)
- Major settlements: Mülheim; Essen (partial)
- Area: 115.8 km^{2}

Current electoral district
- Created: 1949
- Party: SPD
- Member: Sebastian Fiedler
- Elected: 2021, 2025

Mülheim – Essen I is an electoral constituency (German: Wahlkreis) represented in the Bundestag. It elects one member via first-past-the-post voting. Under the current constituency numbering system, it is designated as constituency 117. It is located in the Ruhr region of North Rhine-Westphalia, comprising the city of Mülheim and northwestern parts of the city of Essen.

Mülheim – Essen I was created for the inaugural 1949 federal election. Since 2021, it has been represented by Sebastian Fiedler of the Social Democratic Party (SPD).

== Geography ==
Mülheim – Essen I is located in the Ruhr region of North Rhine-Westphalia. As of the 2021 federal election, it comprises the independent city of Mülheim and the Stadtbezirk IV (Borbeck) from the independent city of Essen.

== History ==
Mülheim – Essen I was created in 1949, then known as Mülheim. It acquired its current name in the 2002 election. In the 1949 election, it was North Rhine-Westphalia constituency 29 in the numbering system. From 1953 through 1961, it was number 88. From 1965 through 1976, it was number 86. From 1980 through 1998, it was number 87. From 2002 through 2009, it was number 119. In the 2013 through 2021 elections, it was number 118. From the 2025 election, it has been number 117.

Originally, the constituency comprised only the city of Mülheim. In the 2002 election, it acquired Stadtbezirk IV (Borbeck) from the city of Essen.

Election	No.	Name	Borders
1949	29	Mülheim	Mülheim city
1953	88	Mülheim	Mülheim city
1957	88	Mülheim	Mülheim city
1961	88	Mülheim	Mülheim city
1965	86	Mülheim	Mülheim city
1969	86	Mülheim	Mülheim city
1972	86	Mülheim	Mülheim city
1976	86	Mülheim	Mülheim city
1980	87	Mülheim	Mülheim city
1983	87	Mülheim	Mülheim city
1987	87	Mülheim	Mülheim city
1990	87	Mülheim	Mülheim city
1994	87	Mülheim	Mülheim city
1998	87	Mülheim	Mülheim city
2002	119	Mülheim – Essen I	Mülheim city; Essen city (only IV (Borbeck) Stadtbezirk)
2005	119	Mülheim – Essen I	Mülheim city; Essen city (only IV (Borbeck) Stadtbezirk)
2009	119	Mülheim – Essen I	Mülheim city; Essen city (only IV (Borbeck) Stadtbezirk)
2013	118	Mülheim – Essen I	Mülheim city; Essen city (only IV (Borbeck) Stadtbezirk)
2017	118	Mülheim – Essen I	Mülheim city; Essen city (only IV (Borbeck) Stadtbezirk)
2021	118	Mülheim – Essen I	Mülheim city; Essen city (only IV (Borbeck) Stadtbezirk)
2025	117	Mülheim – Essen I	Mülheim city; Essen city (only IV (Borbeck) Stadtbezirk)

== Members ==
The constituency has been held by the Social Democratic Party (SPD) during all but two Bundestag terms since 1949. It was first represented by Otto Striebeck of the SPD from 1949 to 1953, followed by Gisela Praetorius of the Christian Democratic Union (CDU) for a single term. Fellow CDU member Max Vehar then served from 1957 to 1961, before former member Striebeck regained the constituency for the SPD. Willi Müller of the SPD was representative from 1965 to 1980, when he was succeeded by Thomas Schröer. Dieter Schloten served from 1990 to 2002, followed by Anton Schaaf until 2013. Arno Klare was elected in 2013 and re-elected in 2017. He was succeeded by Sebastian Fiedler in 2021 and re-elected in 2025.

Election	Member	Party	%
1949	Otto Striebeck	SPD	34.9
1953	Gisela Praetorius	CDU	42.6
1957	Max Vehar	CDU	45.5
1961	Otto Striebeck	SPD	48.1
1965	Willi Müller	SPD	52.6
1969	Willi Müller	SPD	57.5
1972	Willi Müller	SPD	63.0
1976	Willi Müller	SPD	58.0
1980	Thomas Schröer	SPD	56.5
1983	Thomas Schröer	SPD	54.1
1987	Thomas Schröer	SPD	51.7
1990	Dieter Schloten	SPD	46.7
1994	Dieter Schloten	SPD	49.8
1998	Dieter Schloten	SPD	57.5
2002	Anton Schaaf	SPD	53.5
2005	Anton Schaaf	SPD	52.6
2009	Anton Schaaf	SPD	41.4
2013	Arno Klare	SPD	42.2
2017	Arno Klare	SPD	34.9
2021	Sebastian Fiedler	SPD	36.3
2025	Sebastian Fiedler	SPD	32.6

== Election results ==
=== 2025 election ===
Federal election (2025): Mülheim – Essen I
Notes:	Blue background denotes the winner of the electorate vote. Pink background denotes a candidate elected from their party list. Yellow background denotes an electorate win by a list member, or other incumbent. A ✓ or ✗ denotes status of any incumbent, win or lose respectively.						
Party	Candidate	Votes	%	±%	Party votes	%	±%
SPD	✓ Sebastian Fiedler	47,047	32.6	▼3.7	34,203	23.6	▼9.6
CDU	Astrid Timmermann-Fechter	41,707	28.9	▲4.9	40,689	28.1	▲4.5
AfD	Reinard Zielke	25,140	17.4	▲8.9	24,695	17.0	▲9.0
Greens	Björn Maue	13,280	9.2	▼4.9	15,927	11.0	▼3.6
Left	Andreas Johren	9,854	6.8	▲4.2	11,360	7.8	▲4.6
BSW					6,214	4.3	
FDP	Joachim vom Berg	4,958	3.4	▼5.2	6,189	4.3	▼6.7
FW	Maximilian Eitner	2,370	1.6	▲0.8	730	0.5	0.0
Tierschutzpartei					2,090	1.4	▼0.1
PARTEI				▼2.1	882	0.6	▼0.6
Volt					770	0.5	▲0.3
Team Todenhöfer					289	0.2	▼0.6
dieBasis				▼1.1	249	0.2	▼0.7
PdF					219	0.2	▲0.1
BD					148	0.1	
MLPD				▼0.1	81	0.1	▼0.1
Values					80	0.1	
MERA25					58	0.0	
Pirates							3
Gesundheitsforschung							▼0.1
Humanists							▼0.1
Bündnis C							▼0.1
ÖDP							▼0.1
SGP						0.0	0.0
Informal votes		1,277			760		
Total valid votes		144,356			144,873		
Turnout		145,633	82.1	▲5.7			
SPD hold	Majority	5,340	3.7				

=== 2021 election ===
Federal election (2021): Mülheim – Essen I
Notes:	Blue background denotes the winner of the electorate vote. Pink background denotes a candidate elected from their party list. Yellow background denotes an electorate win by a list member, or other incumbent. A ✓ or ✗ denotes status of any incumbent, win or lose respectively.						
Party	Candidate	Votes	%	±%	Party votes	%	±%
SPD	Sebastian Fiedler	50,168	36.3	▲1.4	46,084	33.3	▲3.8
CDU	Astrid Timmermann-Fechter	33,090	24.0	▼7.4	32,698	23.6	▼4.5
Greens	Franziska Krumwiede-Steiner	19,547	14.1	▲8.0	20,232	14.6	▲7.9
FDP	Joachim vom Berg	11,884	8.6	▼0.4	15,188	11.0	▼2.0
AfD	Alexander von Wrese	11,704	8.5	▼3.0	11,135	8.0	▼3.4
Left	Eliseo Francesco Maugeri	3,663	2.7	▼3.9	4,494	3.2	▼4.2
Independent	Horst Bilo	2,243	1.6				
Tierschutzpartei					2,126	1.5	▲0.6
PARTEI	Pascal Plew	2,870	2.1		1,613	1.2	▲0.3
dieBasis	Nicole Weber	1,584	1.1		1,224	0.9	
Team Todenhöfer					1,080	0.8	
FW	Joachim Kluft	1,105	0.8		677	0.5	▲0.3
Pirates					450	0.3	▼0.1
Volt					338	0.2	
Gesundheitsforschung					186	0.1	0.0
LIEBE					184	0.1	
NPD					125	0.1	▼0.1
LfK					120	0.1	
Humanists					98	0.1	0.0
V-Partei3					88	0.1	0.0
Bündnis C					87	0.1	
ÖDP					81	0.1	0.0
MLPD	Hannes Stockert	158	0.1	▼0.1	72	0.1	▼0.1
DKP	Peter Köster	139	0.1		58	0.0	0.0
du.					56	0.0	
LKR					40	0.0	
PdF					34	0.0	
SGP					21	0.0	0.0
Informal votes		1,503			1,069		
Total valid votes		138,155			138,589		
Turnout		139,568	76.4	▲0.3			
SPD hold	Majority	17,078	12.3	▲8.8			

=== 2017 election ===
Federal election (2017): Mülheim – Essen I
Notes:	Blue background denotes the winner of the electorate vote. Pink background denotes a candidate elected from their party list. Yellow background denotes an electorate win by a list member, or other incumbent. A ✓ or ✗ denotes status of any incumbent, win or lose respectively.						
Party	Candidate	Votes	%	±%	Party votes	%	±%
SPD	✓ Arno Klare	49,226	34.9	▼7.3	41,731	29.5	▼8.7
CDU	Astrid Timmermann-Fechter	44,219	31.3	▼4.2	39,847	28.1	▼5.7
AfD	Alexander von Wrese	16,221	11.5	▲7.6	16,200	11.4	▲6.8
FDP	Joachim vom Berg	12,729	9.0	▲6.6	18,337	12.9	▲8.4
Left	Marc Scheffler	9,210	6.5	▲1.0	10,546	7.4	▲1.0
Greens	Franziska Krumwiede-Steiner	8,690	6.2	▼0.2	9,465	6.7	▼0.4
Tierschutzpartei					1,297	0.9	
PARTEI					1,234	0.9	▲0.5
AD-DEMOKRATEN					570	0.4	
Pirates					552	0.4	▼1.7
DIE VIOLETTEN	Elisabeth Walther	430	0.3				
NPD					309	0.2	▼1.2
FW					274	0.2	▲0.1
DiB					179	0.1	
MLPD	Hannes Stockert	339	0.2	▲0.1	163	0.1	0.0
V-Partei³					151	0.1	
BGE					135	0.1	
ÖDP					134	0.1	0.0
Gesundheitsforschung					126	0.1	
DM					117	0.1	
Volksabstimmung					116	0.1	▼0.1
Die Humanisten					79	0.1	
DKP					62	0.0	
SGP					27	0.0	0.0
Informal votes		1,794			1,207		
Total valid votes		141,064			141,651		
Turnout		142,858	76.1	▲2.5			
SPD hold	Majority	5,007	3.6	▼3.0			

=== 2013 election ===
Federal election (2013): Mülheim – Essen I
Notes:	Blue background denotes the winner of the electorate vote. Pink background denotes a candidate elected from their party list. Yellow background denotes an electorate win by a list member, or other incumbent. A ✓ or ✗ denotes status of any incumbent, win or lose respectively.						
Party	Candidate	Votes	%	±%	Party votes	%	±%
SPD	Arno Klare	58,741	42.2	▲0.8	53,275	38.2	▲2.7
CDU	Astrid Timmermann-Fechter	49,487	35.6	▲3.4	47,247	33.9	▲6.8
Greens	Tim Giesbert	8,824	6.3	▼1.4	9,837	7.1	▼2.5
Left	Sylvia von Häfen	7,664	5.5	▼3.2	8,968	6.4	▼3.1
AfD	Martin Fritz	5,383	3.9		6,404	4.6	
FDP	Susanne Rittershaus	3,412	2.5	▼6.1	6,388	4.6	▼8.6
Pirates	Carsten Trojahn	3,093	2.2		2,858	2.0	▲0.6
NPD	Marcel Haliti	2,339	1.7	▲0.3	2,029	1.5	▲0.4
PARTEI					491	0.4	
PRO					469	0.3	
REP					227	0.2	▼0.2
Volksabstimmung					217	0.2	▲0.1
BIG					209	0.1	
FW					167	0.1	
Nichtwahler					151	0.1	
ÖDP					142	0.1	0.0
MLPD	Frank Stierlin	222	0.2		108	0.1	0.0
Party of Reason					78	0.1	
RRP					77	0.1	▼0.1
Die Rechte					53	0.0	
PSG					42	0.0	0.0
BüSo					41	0.0	0.0
Informal votes		1,796			1,483		
Total valid votes		139,165			139,478		
Turnout		140,961	73.6	▲1.4			
SPD hold	Majority	9,254	6.6	▼2.7			

=== 2009 election ===
Federal election (2009): Mülheim – Essen I
Notes:	Blue background denotes the winner of the electorate vote. Pink background denotes a candidate elected from their party list. Yellow background denotes an electorate win by a list member, or other incumbent. A ✓ or ✗ denotes status of any incumbent, win or lose respectively.						
Party	Candidate	Votes	%	±%	Party votes	%	±%
SPD	✓ Anton Schaaf	57,547	41.4	▼11.2	49,498	35.5	▼12.1
CDU	Andreas Schmidt	44,653	32.1	▼0.7	37,762	27.1	▼0.4
Left	Nina Eumann	12,143	8.7	▲3.6	13,226	9.5	▲3.2
FDP	Ulrike Flach	11,852	8.5	▲5.2	18,416	13.2	▲5.1
Greens	Tim Giesbert	10,801	7.8	▲3.7	13,253	9.5	▲2.0
Pirates					2,054	1.5	
NPD	Marcel Haliti	1,940	1.4	▲0.5	1,458	1.0	▲0.3
Tierschutzpartei					1,018	0.7	▲0.3
FAMILIE					698	0.5	▼0.2
REP					538	0.4	▲0.1
RENTNER					518	0.4	
RRP					227	0.2	
MLPD					139	0.1	0.0
Volksabstimmung					108	0.1	0.0
ÖDP					97	0.1	
DVU					83	0.1	
Centre					66	0.0	0.0
BüSo					60	0.0	0.0
PSG					32	0.0	0.0
Informal votes		1,722			1,407		
Total valid votes		138,936			139,251		
Turnout		140,658	72.4	▼7.3			
SPD hold	Majority	12,894	9.3	▼10.5			

=== 2005 election ===
Federal election (2005): Mülheim – Essen I
Notes:	Blue background denotes the winner of the electorate vote. Pink background denotes a candidate elected from their party list. Yellow background denotes an electorate win by a list member, or other incumbent. A ✓ or ✗ denotes status of any incumbent, win or lose respectively.						
Party	Candidate	Votes	%	±%	Party votes	%	±%
SPD	✓ Anton Schaaf	81,810	52.6	▼0.9	74,069	47.6	▼3.9
CDU	Andreas Schmidt	51,021	32.8	▲2.0	42,744	27.5	▼0.1
Left	Jürgen Soppa	7,918	5.1	▲3.8	9,801	6.3	▲5.0
Greens	Hartmut Kremer	6,385	4.1	▼2.1	11,676	7.5	▼1.0
FDP	Ulrike Flach	5,149	3.3	▼3.7	12,595	8.1	▼0.5
Familie	Peter Wülfing	1,477	1.0		1,033	0.7	▲0.5
NPD	Marc Witt	1,326	0.9		1,174	0.8	▲0.5
Tierschutzpartei					706	0.5	▲0.1
GRAUEN					554	0.4	▲0.1
REP					512	0.3	▼0.1
MLPD	Gerhard Schweizerhof	377	0.2		230	0.1	
PBC					150	0.1	
From Now on... Democracy Through Referendum					113	0.1	
Socialist Equality Party					41	0.0	
Centre					38	0.0	
BüSo					38	0.0	0.0
Informal votes		1,827			1,816		
Total valid votes		155,463			155,474		
Turnout		157,290	7l.6	▼1.0			
SPD hold	Majority	30,789	19.8				
