= 2026 in Europe =

This is a list of events that have taken or will take place in Europe in 2026.

== Incumbents ==
=== European Union ===
- Presidency of the Council of the EU:
  - Cyprus (January–June)
  - Ireland (July–December)

== Events ==
=== January ===
- 1 January – Bulgaria adopts the euro and becomes the 21st member state of the eurozone.
- 6 January – The 2025 Jubilee will end on this day.
- 12 January – Hungary grants asylum to former Polish justice minister Zbigniew Ziobro.
- 17 January – In Asunción, Paraguay, EU-commission-president Ursula von der Leyen signs EU–Mercosur Association Agreement with Mercosur.
- 18 January/8 February – 2026 Portuguese presidential election
- 21 January – EU–Mercosur Partnership Agreement, The European Parliament approves a measure by a vote of 334–324 to ask the European Court of Justice to rule on whether the free trade agreement between the EU and Mercosur can be applied before full ratification by all member states and whether its provisions restrict the EU's ability to set environmental and consumer health policies – a move that could delay the deal by two years.
- 26 January - EU-commission-president Ursula von der Leyen signs free treaty agreement, India–European Union Free Trade Agreement, with India.
- 27 January – 23 April – 2026 Slovak–Ukraine oil dispute
  - The Spanish government announces amendments to immigration laws granting unauthorized migrants (potentially 500,000 migrants) legal residency of up to one year along with work permits.
- 29 January - EU sets more sanctions against government ministers of Iran, for example Iranian Interior minister and European Union sets Islamic Revolutionary Guard Corps on list of terror.

=== February ===
- 6–22 February – The Winter Olympics are held in Milan and Cortina d'Ampezzo, Italy.
- 10 February - The European Parliament voted for a new asylum policy and a EU-List of safe countries of origin.

=== March ===
- 6 March – The European Commission rebukes Ukrainian President Volodymyr Zelenskyy over remarks that Hungary interpreted as a threat against Hungarian Prime Minister Viktor Orbán.
- 6–15 March – The Winter Paralympics are held in Milan and Cortina d'Ampezzo, Italy.
- 22 March – 2026 Slovenian parliamentary election
- 24 March – 2026 Danish general election
- 24 March - The EU and Australia concluded negotiations on a comprehensive Free Trade Agreement (FTA) on March 24, 2026, aimed at removing over 99% of tariffs on EU exports and 98% of Australian goods exports to the EU.

=== April ===
- 12 April – 2026 Hungarian parliamentary election
- 19 April – 2026 Bulgarian parliamentary election
- 21 April – European Commission v Hungary
- 30 April – The Parliament of Europe adopted a resolution, calling for a ban on conversion therapies in all member states of EU.

=== May ===
- 24 May - 2026 Cypriot legislative election
- 30 May - 2026 Maltese general election

=== June ===
- 7 June – 2026 Armenian parliamentary election
- 7 June – 2026 Kosovan parliamentary election
- 12 June – The EU Migration Pact takes effect.
- 19 June – Polish president Karol Nawrocki strips Ukrainian president Volodymyr Zelenskyy of the Order of the White Eagle, Poland's highest state honour, after Zelenskyy honored a special operations forces unit with the name "Heroes of the Ukrainian Insurgent Army", a Nazi-collaborating organization that conducted a genocide against Poles in Volhynia and Eastern Galicia.

=== July ===
- 2 July – Almost 1.2 million of Spain's undocumented migrants apply for legal status for the Spanish government amnesty plan. More than twice the expected number of 500,000.
- 30 July – Tens of thousands of migrants enter the Spanish enclave city of Ceuta from its border with Morocco. At least 18 people die in the process.
- 23 July – 2 August – 2026 Commonwealth Games

=== August ===
- 19 August – Portugal bans face coverings in public.

=== September ===
- 2 September –
  - 2026 Estonian presidential election
  - On Ceuta Day, tens of thousands of people across Spain joined mass protests against Sánchez in support of the city of Ceuta becouse of the 2026 Ceuta migrant crisis.
- 7 September – Thousands in Serbia, attended genocide convict Ratko Mladic's funeral in Belgrade, with the service being led by the Serbian Patriarch Porfirije.
- 13 September – 2026 Swedish general election
- 15 September – The European Parliament lifts the legal immunity of extreme right-wing Polish deputy Grzegorz Braun.
- 20 September – 2026 Russian legislative election
- 26 September – A right-wing demonstration in Madrid over the 2026 Ceuta migrant crisis draws tens of thousands of people.
- 27 September – The European Union pledges more than 710 million euros ($810 million) to aid those impacted by crises, natural disasters, or conflicts around the world, especially in Africa.

=== October ===
- 3 October – 2026 Latvian parliamentary election
- 4 October – 2026 Bosnian general election
- 12 October – The European Union forms a new support mission for Lebanon.
- 22 October – The European Union grants the Sakharov Prize to the International Criminal Court.
- 25 October – 2026 Bulgarian presidential election
- 25 October – 2026 Serbian parliamentary election

=== November ===
- 6 November – Officials throughout Europe reports a new wave of bomb threats against several planes and media outlets, following a number of hoaxes that have prompted flight delays that week, with European governments and officials pointing to a possible Russian-backed hybrid operation.
- 19 November - Meeting of 42 governments in Berlin, Germany, to help Ukraine in war against Russia

==== Scheduled and confirmed events ====
- 29 November – 2026 Spanish general election

== See also ==
- 2026 in the European Union
- 2026 in politics
