= 2026 in the European Union =

- Decades: 2000s; 2010s; 2020s
- See also: Other events of 2026; Timeline of EU history

Events from 2026 in the European Union.

== Incumbents ==
=== European Union ===
- (European Union) President of the European Council
  - (Portugal) António Costa
- (European Union) Commission President
  - (Germany) Ursula von der Leyen
- (European Union) Presidency of the Council of the EU:
  - Cyprus (January–June)
  - (Republic of Ireland) Ireland (July–December)
- (European Union) Parliament President
  - (Malta) Roberta Metsola
- (European Union) High Representative
  - (Estonia) Kaja Kallas

== Events ==
=== January ===
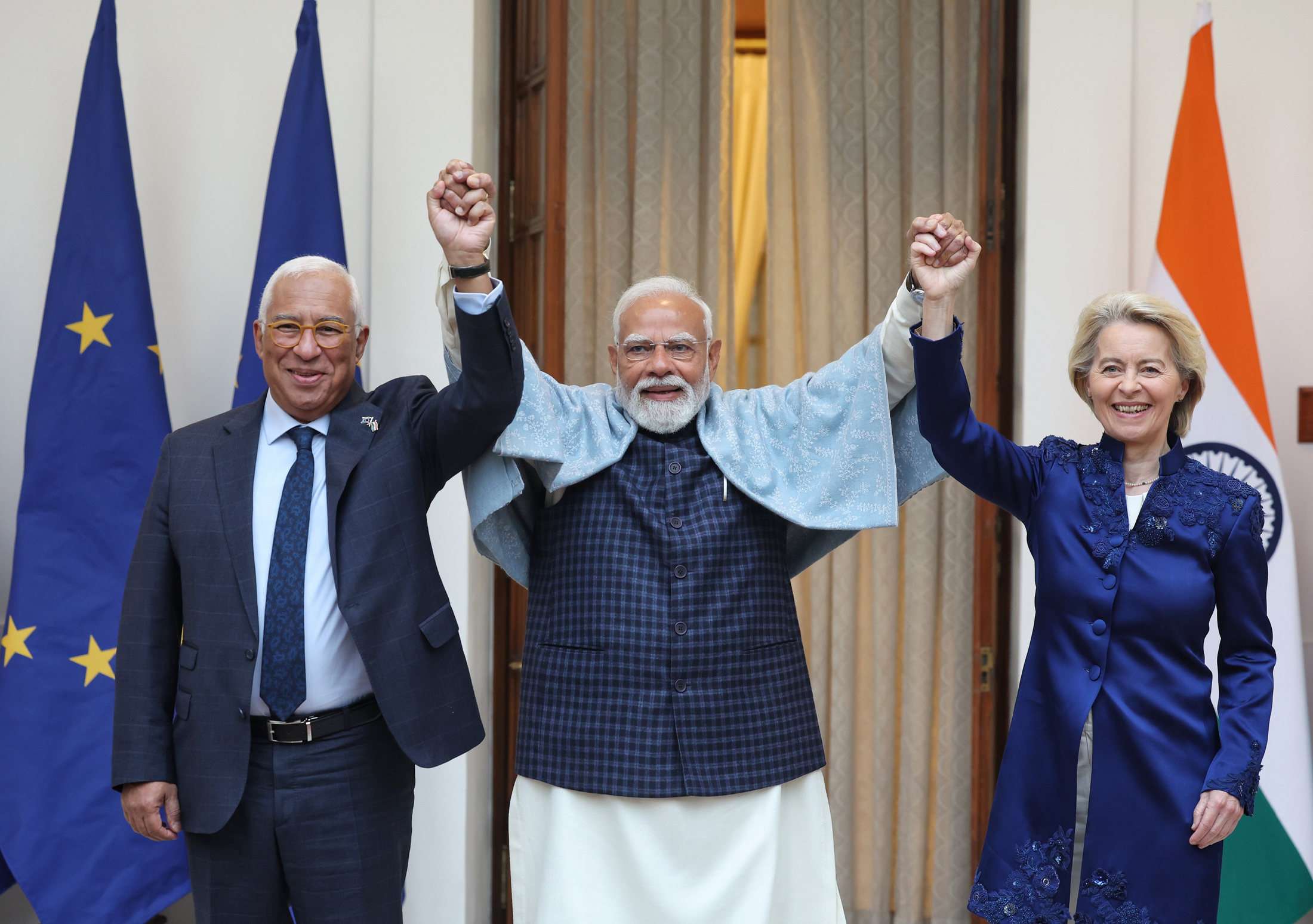
Ursula von der Leyen, Indian Prime Minister Narendra Modi, and António Costa during the signing of the free trade and mobility agreement in New Delhi on 27 January 2026

- 1 January – Bulgaria adopts the euro and becomes the 21st member state of the eurozone.
- 12 January – Hungary grants asylum to former Polish justice minister Zbigniew Ziobro.
- 17 January – In Asunción, Paraguay, EU-commission-president Ursula von der Leyen signs the EU–Mercosur Partnership Agreement with Mercosur.
- 18 January/8 February – 2026 Portuguese presidential election
- 21 January – Regarding the EU–Mercosur Partnership Agreement, the European Parliament approves a measure by a vote of 334–324 to ask the European Court of Justice to rule on whether the free trade agreement between the EU and Mercosur can be applied before full ratification by all member states and whether its provisions restrict the EU's ability to set environmental and consumer health policies, a move that could delay the deal by two years.
- 24 January - The India–European Union Free Trade Agreement (simply called the India–EU FTA) is a comprehensive free trade agreement concluded between the Republic of India and the European Union (EU) on 27 January 2026, following negotiations that spanned nearly two decades.
- 27 January – India and the European Union signed a memorandum of understanding on mobility to facilitate opportunities for skilled workers, students and researchers.
- 27 January -
  - European Commission president Ursula von der Leyen signs a free treaty agreement, India–European Union Free Trade Agreement with India
  - The Spanish government of Pedro Sánchez announces amendments to immigration laws granting unauthorized migrants (potentially 500,000 migrants) legal residency (amnesty) of up to one year along with work permits.
- 2026 Slovak–Ukraine oil dispute 27 January 2026 – present
  - The Spanish government announces amendments to immigration laws granting unauthorized migrants (potentially 500,000 migrants) legal residency of up to one year along with work permits.
- 29 January - The EU announces more sanctions against government ministers of Iran, including the Interior minister and lists the Islamic Revolutionary Guard Corps as a terrorist organisation.

=== February ===
- 6 February – 22 February – The Winter Olympics are held in Milan and Cortina d'Ampezzo, Italy.
- 10 February - The European parliament votes in favour of a new asylum policy and a EU-list of safe countries of origin.
- 20 February - Hungary announces it would block a €90 billion EU loan to Ukraine until the resumption of oil supplies to the country via the Druzhba pipeline.
- 23 February - Slovakia joins Hungary in blocking the European Union’s 20th sanctions package against Russia, preventing its adoption ahead of the fourth anniversary of the full-scale invasion of Ukraine. Fico specifically linked his opposition to the suspension of oil transit through the Druzhba pipeline, characterising the situation as a deliberate provocation by Ukraine.

=== March ===
- 5 March – Ukraine's President Volodymyr Zelenskyy says he would prefer not to repair the Druzhba oil pipeline for Hungary and Slovakia, by saying "my position, which is shared with European leaders, is that I would not repair the pipeline".
- 6 March – The European Commission rebukes Ukrainian President Volodymyr Zelenskyy over remarks that Hungary interpreted as a threat against Hungarian Prime Minister Viktor Orbán.
- 6–15 March – The Winter Paralympics are held in Milan and Cortina d'Ampezzo, Italy.
- 22 March – 2026 Slovenian parliamentary election returns a loss of majority for the governing coalition.
- 24 March – 2026 Danish general election
- 24 March – The EU and Australia concluded negotiations on a comprehensive Free Trade Agreement (FTA) on March 24, 2026, aimed at removing over 99% of tariffs on EU exports and 98% of Australian goods exports to the EU.

=== April ===
Ursula von der Leyen, António Costa, and Syrian President Ahmad al-Sharaa, 24 April 2026

- 12 April – 2026 Hungarian parliamentary election produces a Tisza Party supermajority, ending Fidesz–KDNP's 16-year and longest rule. Péter Magyar becomes prime minister.
- 19 April – 2026 Bulgarian parliamentary election
- 21 April – The European Court of Justice rules in European Commission v Hungary that the Hungarian anti-LGBTQ law violates EU rules.
- 30 April – The Parliament of Europe adopted a resolution, calling for a ban on conversion therapies in all memberstates of EU.

=== May ===
- 24 May – 2026 Cypriot legislative election
- 30 May – 2026 Maltese general election

=== June ===
- 12 June – The EU Migration Pact takes effect.

=== July ===
- 2 July – Almost 1.2 million of Spain's undocumented migrants apply for legal status for the Spanish government amnesty plan. More than twice the expected number of 500,000.
- 24 July – The United States imposes a 10% tariff on the European Union, citing the presence of alleged forced labour in the supply chain.
- 28 July – The Council of the European Union made compliance with military obligations in Ukraine a condition for newly granted temporary protection to displaced Ukrainians.
- 30 July – Thousands of migrants enter the Spanish enclave of Ceuta from its border with Morocco. At least 18 people die in the process.

=== August ===
- 21 August – 2026 Fagersta school attack
- 29 August – 2026 Icelandic European Union membership negotiations referendum. Iceland votes to reject the proposal for resuming EU accession negotiations.

=== September ===
- 2 September –
  - 2026 Estonian presidential election
  - On Ceuta Day, tens of thousands of people across Spain joined mass protests against Sánchez in support of the city of Ceuta.
- 13 September – 2026 Swedish general election
- 15 September – The European Parliament lifts the legal immunity of extreme right-wing Polish deputy Grzegorz Braun, who may now face criminal charges for Holocaust denial.
- 26 September – A right-wing demonstration in Madrid over the 2026 Ceuta migrant crisis draws tens of thousands of people.

=== October ===
Protesters atop the Monument à la République in Paris on 17 October 2026, amid the nationwide 2026 French student protests.

- 3 October – 2026 Latvian parliamentary election
- 13 October – The Hungarian National Assembly passes an amendment repealing most provisions of the anti-LGBTQ child protection law that was previously passed during former prime minister Viktor Orbán's tenure in 2021. Minutes after the vote, the EU released €4.2bn (£3.5bn) of funds frozen to Hungary.
- 21 October – Czech MEP and former leader of the Czech Communist Party, Kateřina Konečná announces that she had joined the Patriots for Europe group.
- 25 October – 2026 Bulgarian presidential election

=== November ===
- 16 November – Germany, Austria, Greece, Denmark and the Netherlands confirm plans to deport rejected asylum seekers to a deportation hub in Rwanda.
- 19 November – it is reported that the European People's Party (EPP) wants to suspend the membership of Serbian Progressive Party (SNS). The EPP also listed demands for the SNS to follow if it wanted to stay in the EPP. Cutting its ties with United Russia, supporting EU sanctions against Moscow, distancing SNS from the Chinese government and renewing its commitment to EU integration.

=== Scheduled and confirmed events ===
- September – The Slovak Smer-SD is reported to make a decision on whether or not to join Patriots for Europe in the European Parliament.
- 29 November – 2026 Spanish general election

== See also ==
=== Overviews ===
- European Union
- History of European Union
- Outline of European Union
- Politics of European Union
- Timeline of European Union history
- Years in European Union
- History of modern European Union
- Institutions of the European Union

=== Related timelines for current period ===
- 2026
- 2026 in Europe
- 2020s
