= Bab Sebta =

2008 Portuguese documentary film

- Directed by: Pedro Pinho, Frederico Lobo
- Screenplay by: Pedro Pinho, Frederico Lobo
- Produced by: Luísa Homem
- Cinematography: Pedro Pinho, Luísa Homem, Frederico Lobo
- Edited by: Luísa Homem, Frederico Lobo, Rui Pires, Claudia Silvestre, Pedro Pinho
- Release date: 2008
- Running time: 110 minutes
- Country: Portugal

Bab Sebta (English: Door of Ceuta) is a Portuguese 2008 documentary film.

== Synopsis ==
Beginning with the 2005 violence at the Melilla and Ceuta border fences, Bab Sebta interviews people in four North African cities to explore why some people are willing to risk all to emigrate to Europe. Interviews took place in Tangier and Oujda in Morocco, and Nouadhibou and Nouakchott in Mauritania.

== Awards ==
- FIDMarseille 2008
- Doclisboa 2008

== See also ==
- Victimes de nos richesses, a 2006 documentary film about violence at the Melilla and Ceuta border fences.
