= Port of Ceuta =

Port of Ceuta

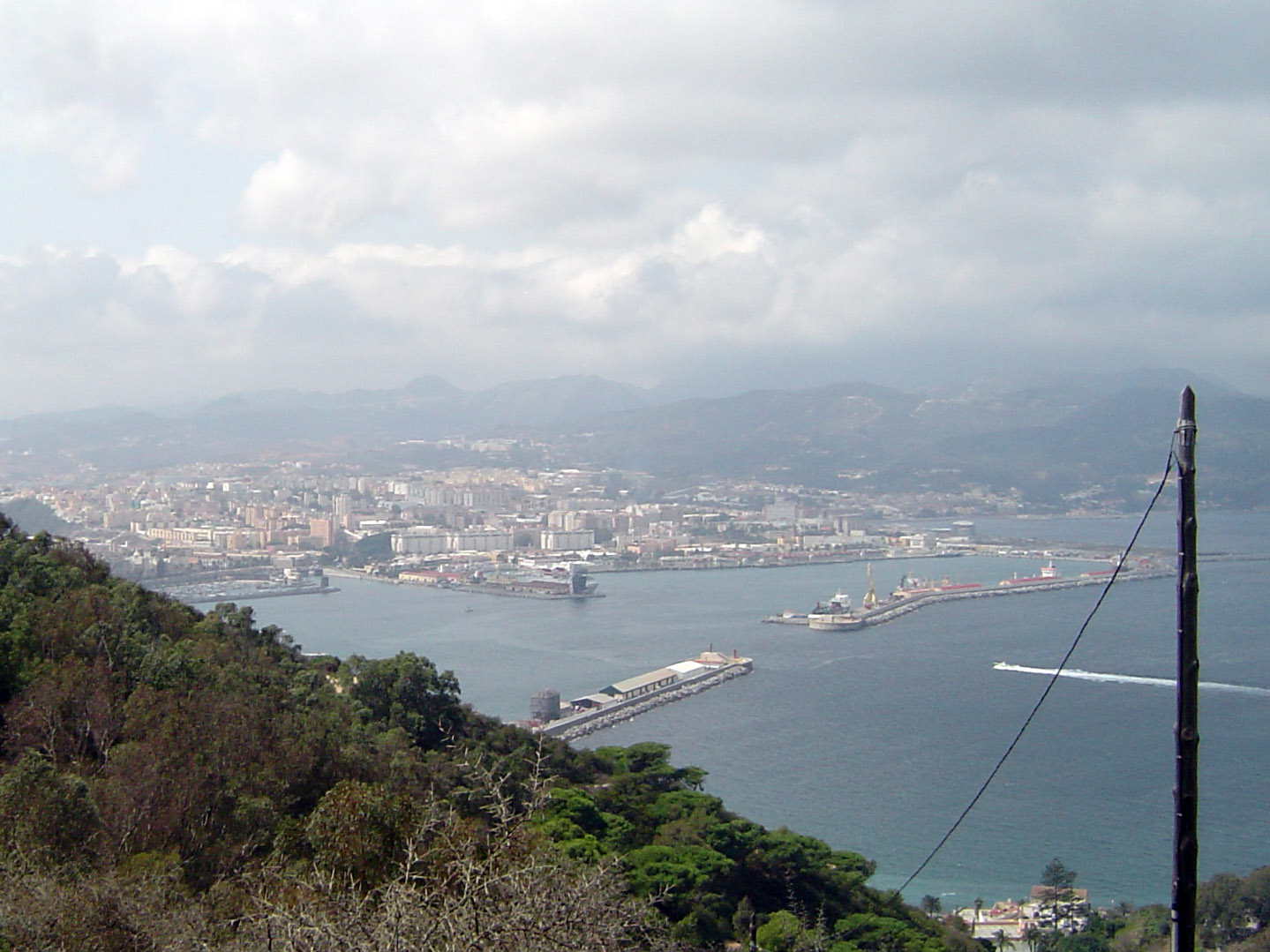
- The port as seen from Monte Hacho

- Interactive map of Port of Ceuta

Location
- Country: Spain
- Location: Ceuta
- Coordinates: 35.890349°N 5.316386°W
- UN/LOCODE: ESCEU

Details
- Operated by: Port Authority of Ceuta

Statistics
- Annual cargo tonnage: 2.5 million tonnes (2017)

The Port of Ceuta is a passenger and cargo port located on the North African coast, in the Strait of Gibraltar, belonging to the Spanish autonomous city of Ceuta.

== Description ==
Finished in 1942, it reached its pinnacle in activity during the time of the Spanish protectorate in Morocco, as it served the inland area, declining after the independence of Morocco in 1956. It is managed by the port authority of the same name. The contemporary activity of the port is centered in the obtention of provisions by the local market, in vessel supplies, the ferry service linking to ports in the Iberian Peninsula and its role as centre for providing logistic and industrial services. Despite the closed customs with Morocco the port also has a role for the entry of products to Morocco, through the means of closeted smuggling by informal "porters" crossing the border with personal luggage. Most of the cargo shipping is ro-ro.

Spanish National Police agents (with the collaboration of Frontex agents) are deployed in the port for border control tasks. (Note: During the 2026 Morocco-Spain border incident, Italian and Portuguese police were active together with the National Police.)

== Bibliography ==
- Arnaiz Seco, Javier (1998). "La estación marítima del Puerto de Ceuta" (PDF). Revista Arquitectura. Madrid: Colegio Oficial de Arquitectos de Madrid: 40–47.
- Moreno Navarro, Jesús Gabriel; Ventura Fernández, Jesús (2008). "A new port competition scheme in the Strait of Gibraltar: Tanger-Med gets into scene". Comercio, servicios y transportes: patrones de una sociedad avanzada. IV Congreso de Geografía de los Servicios (PDF). pp. 355–364. ISBN 978-84-933457-9-2.
- Couceiro Martínez, Luis; Serrano Pérez, Marta; Magro Andrade, Rafael (2013). "Competitividad de un Puerto y su Relación Actual con el Sistema Portuario Español". Tecnologí@ y desarrollo. XI. Universidad Alfonso X el Sabio. ISSN 1696-8085.
