= Anton Schaaf =

German politician (1962–2020)

- Born: 30 January 1962; Langenfeld, Rhineland, West Germany
- Died: 2 November 2020 (aged 58)
- Political party: Social Democratic (since 1986)
- Spouse: Monika Müller
- Children: 4

Anton Schaaf (30 January 1962 – 2 November 2020) was a German politician and trade unionist.

== Early life ==
Schaaf was born in Langenfeld in 1962 and grew up there with four siblings. His father left the family when he was 11. After secondary school, he first became an apprentice bricklayer, then got his high school diploma and did community service. After that, he worked in bricklaying and then for nine years as a garbage truck driver in Mülheim. He joined the Socialist Youth of Germany – Falcons in 1977 and became a part of its federal executive board. He joined the Social Democratic Party of Germany as a trainee in 1986 and was thereafter let go of his garbage disposal job.

== Political career ==
He was part of the municipal council of Mülheim and led the local association Dümpten Nord from 2001 to 2002. In 2002, he was elected to the Bundestag and sat in parliament as a member of the Mülheim – Essen I constituency until 2013. In the 2005 federal election, he got 52.6% of the first votes, and in the 2009 election he got 41.4%. In the 16th Bundestag, he was the only worker in the SPD parliamentary group. In 2013, he no longer ran in favor of his wife Monika Müller as she had become mayor of social affairs in Pforzheim.

In 2016, Schaaf ran for the Landtag of Baden-Württemberg but only received 12.1% of the votes. From 2016 to 2018, he was district chairman of the SPD in Karlsruhe-Land. He moved to Wolfsburg because his wife became a city councilor for sport, social affairs, and health there.

== Personal life and death ==
Schaaf married a lawyer named Monika Müller and fathered four children. Schaaf died on 2 November 2020 at the age of 58.
