= Melilla border fence =

Part of the Morocco–Spain border at Melilla

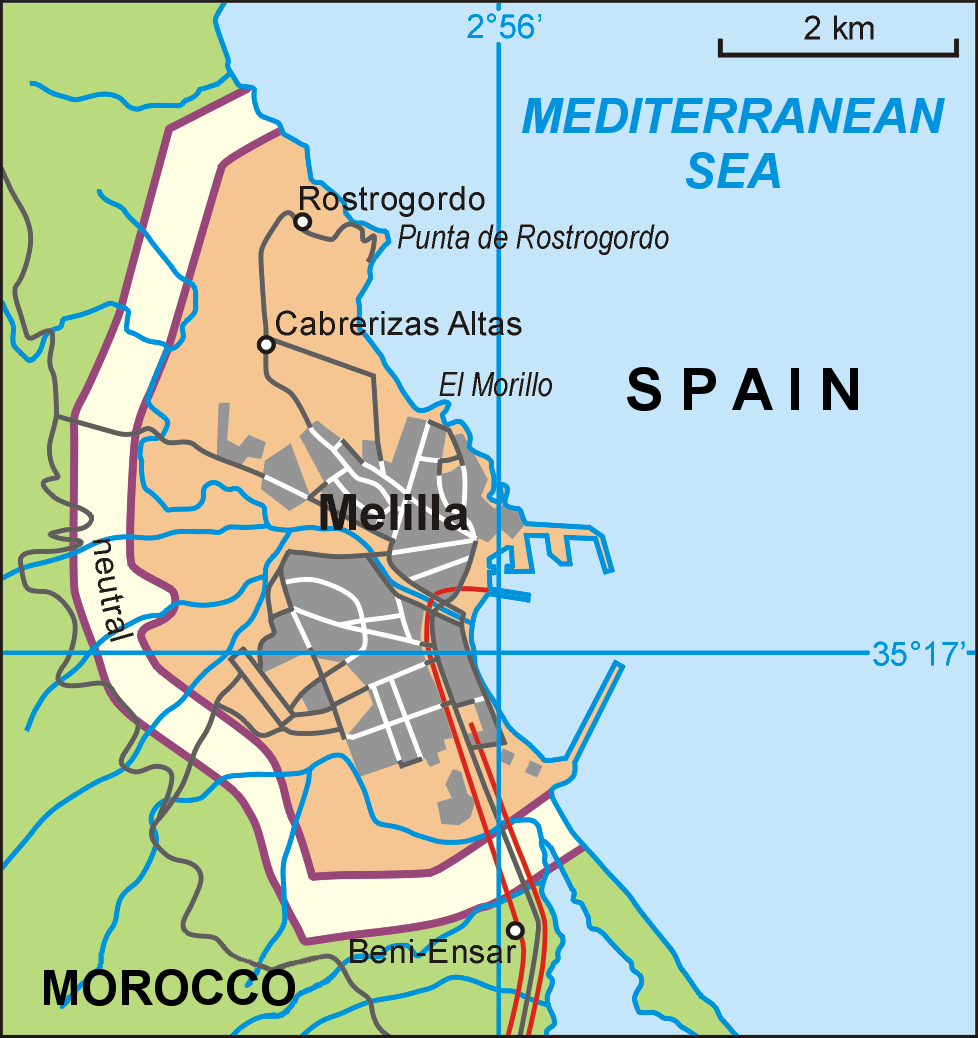
Layout of Melilla

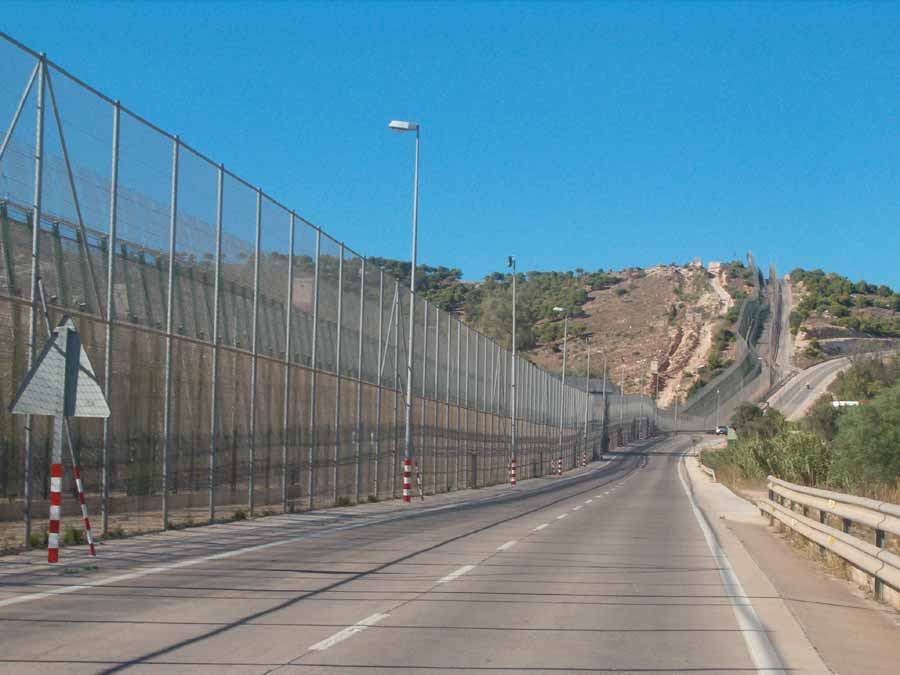
Morocco–Spain border, by Melilla

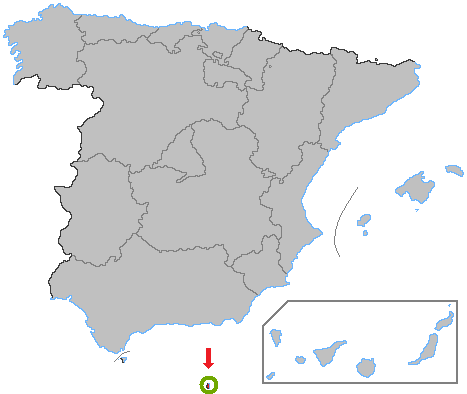
Melilla

The Melilla border fence forms part of the Morocco–Spain border in the city of Melilla, one of two Spanish cities in north Africa. Constructed by Spain, its stated purpose is to stop illegal immigration and smuggling. Melilla's border and its equivalent in Ceuta, along with the tiny island-turned-peninsula Peñón de Vélez de la Gomera, are the only land borders between the European Union and an African country.

== Recent history ==
In September 2005, some thousands of sub-Saharan African migrants tried to climb over the fences in several waves moving upon Melilla. About 700 made it past the fences while six died in clashes with Moroccan security forces. The 2005 events at the Melilla and Ceuta border fences are the subject of a documentary film, Victimes de nos richesses.

Three hundred people attempted and 30 succeeded in climbing the fence in August 2020, some of the 2,250 people who entered Ceuta and Melilla in 2020. Eighty-seven people scaled the fence on 19 January 2021; nine were taken to hospital. 2000 people attempted to scale the fence on 24 June 2022; 133 successfully. Twenty-three people died and several were taken to the hospital.

== Renovation ==
Anti-immigration sentiment toward African migrants prompted the Spanish government of José Luis Rodríguez Zapatero in 2005 to build a new border fence. This border fence, built next to the two deteriorated existing ones, completely seals the border. In 2018, the new interior minister of Spain recognized the anti-immigration sentiment that the fence stems from and vowed to replace the razor wire along its top with more humane deterrents. "Spain's new interior minister has vowed to do "everything possible" to remove the "anti-migrant" razor wire fences, which separate Morocco from the Spanish territories of Ceuta and Melilla."

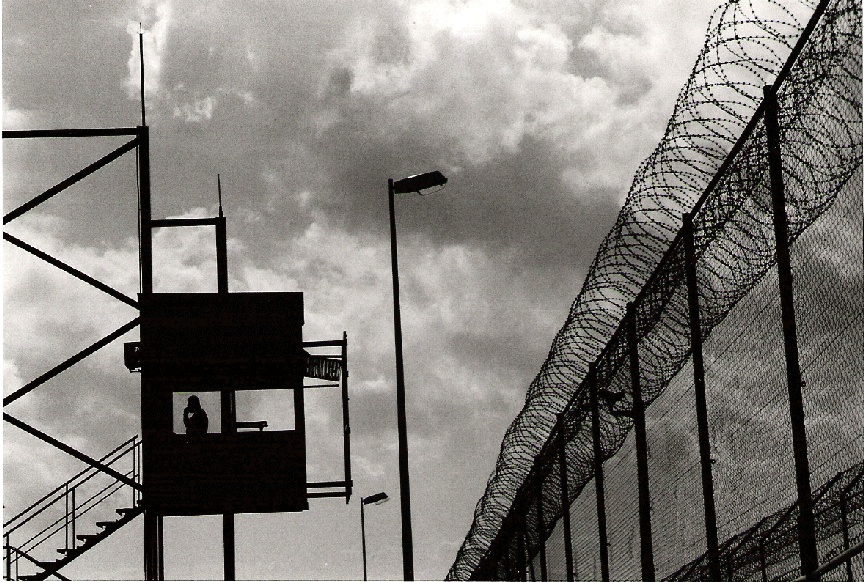
Guard post and razor wire on the border fence in 2006

This third razor wire barrier cost Spain €33 million to construct. It consists of 11 km (6.8 mi) of parallel 3 m (9 ft 10 in) high fences topped with barbed wire, with regular watchposts and a road running between them to accommodate either police patrols or ambulance service in case of need. Underground cables connect spotlights, noise and movement sensors, and video cameras to a central control booth. In 2005 its height was doubled to 6 m (19 ft 8 in) since immigrants were climbing the previous fences equipped with home-made ladders. Also, devices to slow them harmlessly were added to facilitate the intruders' detention.

Even with three fences built, people still scale them and arrive on Spanish territory. From these, Amnesty International and Médecins Sans Frontières accused the Moroccan government of dumping people from various African countries (some of them claiming to be validly registered as political refugees) in an uninhabited area of the Sahara Desert without food or water supplies.

== See also ==
- Bab Sebta
- Ceuta border fence
- General Command of Melilla
- Moroccan Wall
