= Playa Benítez =

Beach in Ceuta, Spain

Coordinates: 35°53′48″N 5°20′16″W

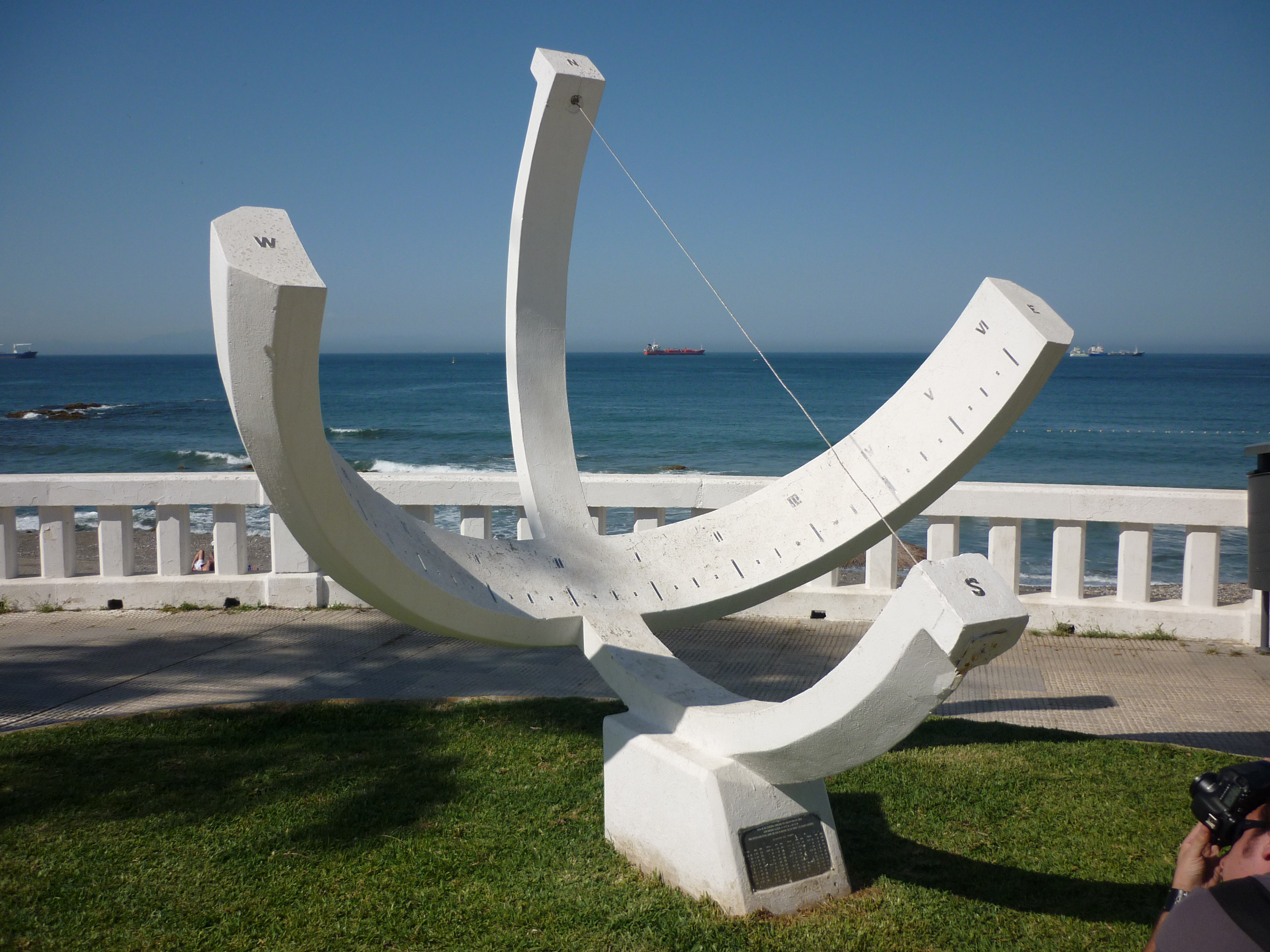
Playa Benítez

Playa Benítez is a beach of Ceuta, a Spanish city bordering northern Morocco. The beach is about 900 metres (3,000 ft) in length with an average width of about 200 metres (660 ft). It forms part of the Punta Blanca. The beach is popular with sports enthusiasts.
