= Astrid Timmermann-Fechter =

German politician

Personal details
- Born: 22 June 1963 (age 63) Marl, North Rhine-Westphalia, West Germany
- Party: CDU

Astrid Timmermann-Fechter (born 22 June 1963) is a German politician. She is a member of the Christian Democrat Union political party. She was elected to Germany's Bundestag, the federal parliament, from 2013 to 2017 and again since 2021.

== Early life ==
Timmermann-Fechter was born in 1963 in the West German town of Marl, North Rhine-Westphalia. She completed her school leaving certificate, and studied law at university.

== Career ==
Timmermann-Fechter became an entrepreneur, running her own event and marketing business. She also worked as a political and strategy advisor.

Timmermann-Fechter joined the Christian Democrat Union in 1998, serving as district manager in the city of Mülheim, and as local branch chairwoman from 2000 to 2014. From 2005 to 2013, she was the deputy district treasurer of the party and from 2005 to 2014 the district chairwoman of the Evangelical Working Group of the CDU. She was also member of the group's state board for North Rhine-Westphalia from 2007 to 2013.

Timmermann-Fechter served a member of the Bundestag from 2013 to 2017 and again since 2021.
