= Sebastian Fiedler =

German politician (born 1973)

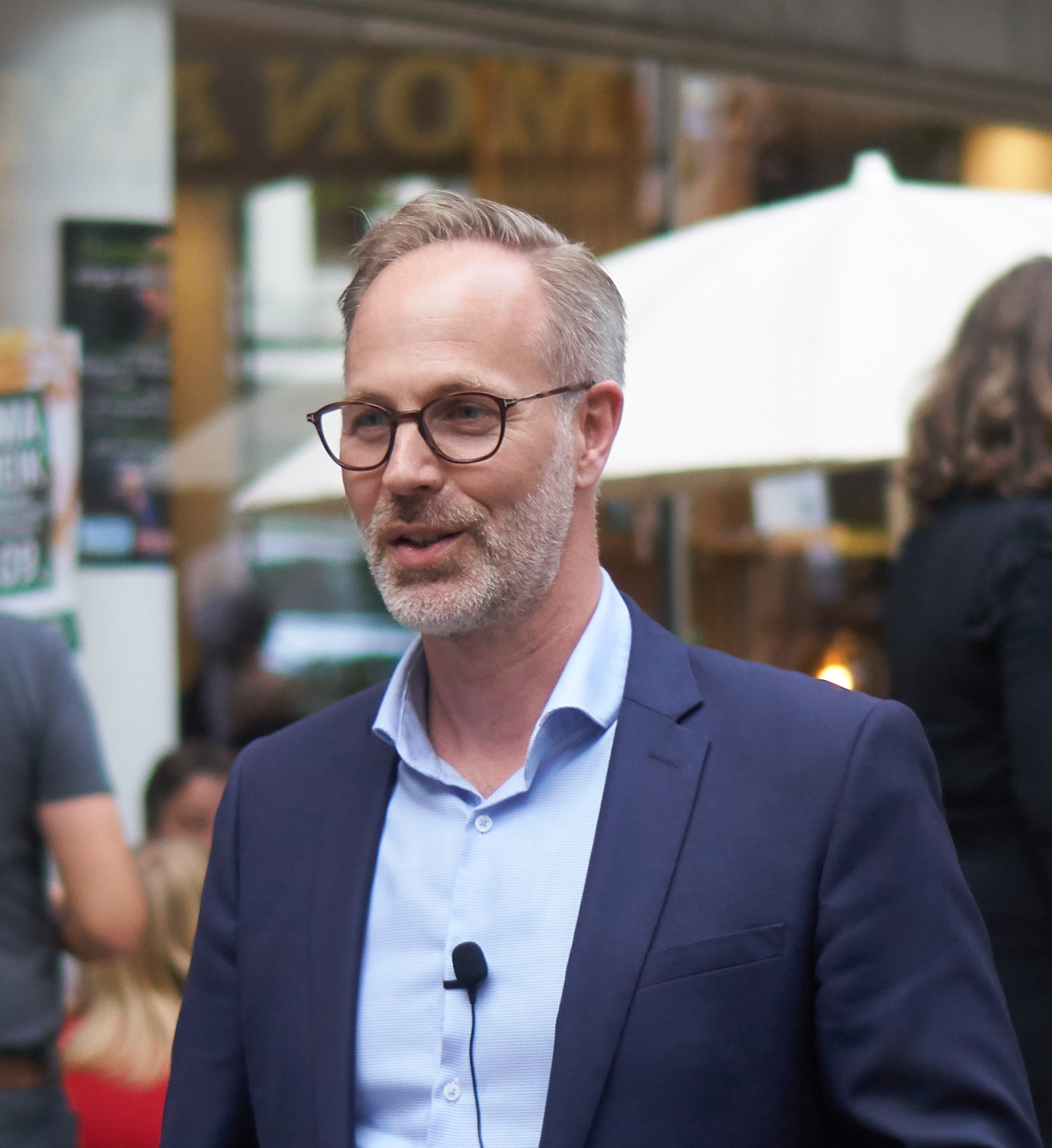

Member of the Bundestag
- Incumbent
- Assumed office 2021
- Constituency: Mülheim – Essen I

Personal details
- Born: 19 June 1973 (age 53) Herdecke, Germany
- Party: Social Democratic Party

Sebastian Fiedler (born 19 June 1973 in Herdecke) is a German politician from the Social Democratic Party of Germany (SPD). He has been serving as a Member of the German Bundestag for Mülheim – Essen I since 2021.

== Early life ==
Fiedler was born in Herdecke and grew up in Wetter.

== Career ==
Before entering politics, Fiedler formerly worked as a police officer.

Since the 2025 elections, Fiedler has been his parliamentary group's spokesperson on internal affairs.

== See also ==
- List of members of the 20th Bundestag
