= Arno Klare =

German politician

Member of the Bundestag
- In office 2013–2021

Personal details
- Born: 1 February 1952 (age 74) Oberhausen, West Germany (now Germany)
- Party: SPD

Arno Klare (born 1 February 1952) is a German politician of the Social Democratic Party (SPD) who served as a member of the Bundestag from the state of North Rhine-Westphalia from 2013 until 2021.

== Political career ==
Klare became a member of the Bundestag after the 2013 German federal election. He was a member of the Committee on Transport and Digital Infrastructure.

In November 2020, Klare announced he will not be in next Bundestag in 2021 German federal election. In 2025 he was lobbying for the German Aero Industry in Bundestag.
