= Ceuta border fence =

Part of the Morocco–Spain border at Ceuta

Coordinates: 35.89795°N 5.36407°W

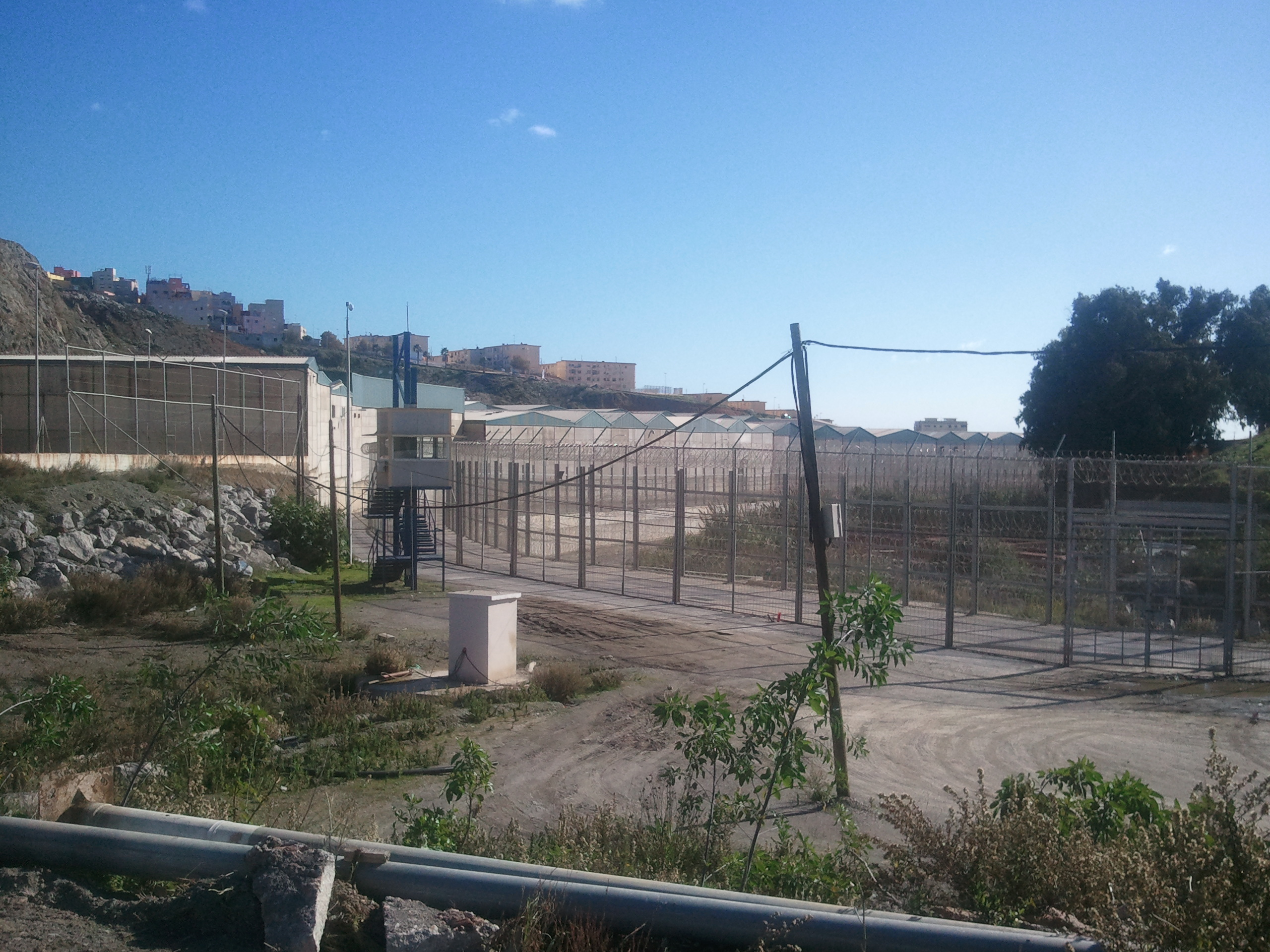
The fence

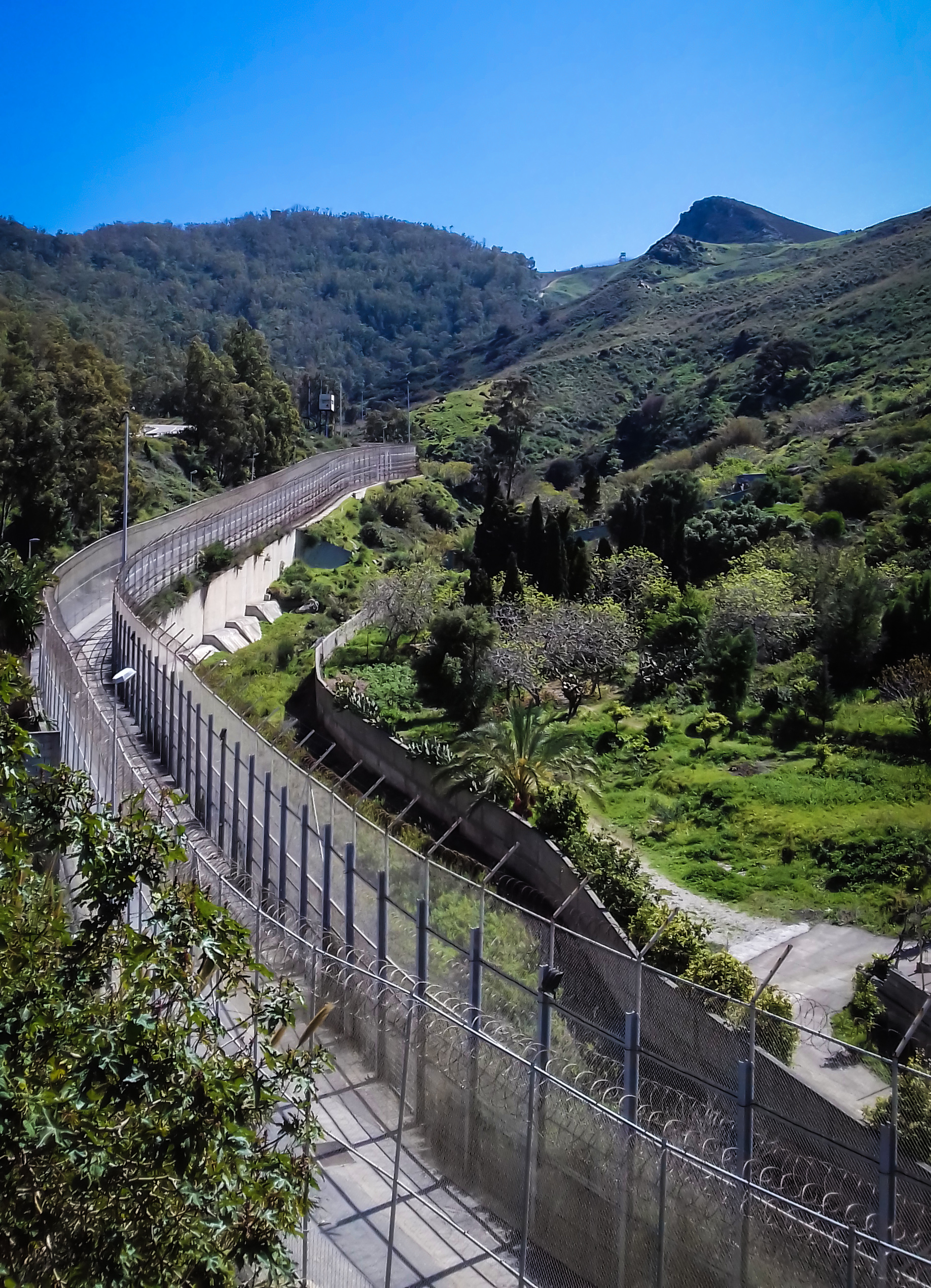
The Ceuta-Morocco border fence, as seen from Ceuta.

The Ceuta border fence forms part of the Morocco–Spain border at Ceuta, a city on the North African coast. Constructed by Spain, its purpose is to prevent smuggling and to stop migrants from entering Europe. Morocco objected to the construction of the barrier since it does not recognize Spanish sovereignty in Ceuta. Ceuta is an integral part of Spain, and therefore of the European Union; its border and its equivalent in Melilla are the only two land borders between the European Union and an African country.

The fence consists of parallel 6-metre-high (20 ft) fences topped with barbed wire, with regular watchposts and a road running between them to accommodate police patrols or ambulance service in case of need. Underground cables connect spotlights, noise and movement sensors, and video cameras to a central control booth; dozens of guard ships and patrol boats check the coast, while 621 Guardia Civil officers and 548 police officers control the shore.

== History ==
In 1993, a 2.5-metre-high (8 ft 2 in) and 8.4-kilometre-long (5.2 mi) fence was built around the exclave. As the first fence was too easy to cross, the construction of a new system started in 1995, bringing the height up to 3 metres (9 ft 10 in). In 2005 the height was further increased, from 3 to 6 m (9 ft 10 in to 19 ft 8 in).

== Breaches ==
=== 2005 attempted border breach ===
On 7 October 2005, the border fence was assaulted by hundreds of migrants, attracting international attention. Caught between Spanish rubber bullets and Moroccan gunfire, a number of migrants died (sources put the number of deaths between 13 and 18 people) and more than 50 were wounded. Some of the dead were wounded by live ammunition; of those, two died on the Spanish side of the fence, apparently shot from the Moroccan positions. The 2005 events at the Ceuta and Melilla border fences are the subject of the 2006 documentary film, Victimes de nos richesses ("Victims of our wealth").

Since then, migrants have occasionally died while trying to break through the fence.

=== 2016 breach ===
The fence was breached by an organised group of 400 illegal entrants in December 2016.

=== 2017 breach ===
On 17 February 2017, an estimated 600 migrants, some armed with clubs and shears, broke through the security gates, and 300 of them are reported to have entered Ceuta, where police attempted to locate them.

=== 2018 breaches ===
In June 2018, 400 migrants, the majority of whom were Moroccans, stormed the fence in Ceuta. In July 2018, 602 migrants forced their way across the border using shears, sticks and edged weapons. The migrants sprayed corrosive substances, excrement and urine on police officers, resulting in 22 Spanish police officers being wounded, four of whom suffered major burns. After this breach, the border was reinforced with more personnel, extra police vehicles and a helicopter equipped with night-vision equipment. In August 2018, of the hundreds who attempted to force their way into Ceuta, more than 100 people succeeded, bringing the overall total to 1,400. The migrants again threw excrement and corrosive substances at the Spanish police, wounding seven, some of whom suffered burns. The following day, 116 Africans were deported back across the border per a 1992 bilateral agreement between Spain and Morocco.

=== 2019 breaches ===
In August 2019, migrants stormed the fence using sticks and acid. Dozens were injured, 4 people died on the barbed wire and 11 border agents were wounded.

=== 2021 breaches ===
There were further breaches in May 2021, when migrants were filmed swimming or walking around the ends of the fence on the adjoining beaches at low tide.

=== 2023 ===
On 17 November about 1000 migrants tried to enter Ceuta by charging from the East, the South and the West simultaneously. Moroccan police stopped some 900 people before those reached the fence, the rest failed to get over the barrier.

=== 2026 ===
On 30 July 2026, during the Throne Day celebration in M'diq, a large number of people forced their way into the enclave at the Tarajal breakwater. Activists initially estimated more than 2000 people crossed that day and another 1500 arrived the week before according to regional authorities, but numbers of arrivals continued to increase over the next day, and Spanish authorities claimed on 31 July that some 49,000 individuals had entered Ceuta in the past 24 hours.

== See also ==
- Melilla border fence
- Moroccan Wall
- Spanish Armed Forces: General Command of Ceuta (COMGECEU)
- Bab Sebta

== Bibliography in English ==
- Ferrer-Gallardo, Xavier. 2008. "The Spanish-Moroccan Border Complex: Processes of Geopolitics, Functional and Symbolic Rebordering." Political Geography 27: 301–321.
- Gold, Peter. 2000. Europe or Africa: A Contemporary Study of the North African Enclaves of Ceuta and Melilla. Liverpool: Liverpool University Press.
- Moffette, David. 2013. "Muslim Ceutíes, Migrants and Porteadores: Race, Security and Tolerance at the Spanish-Moroccan Border." Canadian Journal of Sociology 38(4): 601–621.
- Valsecchi, Riccardo. 2009. "Ceuta, the border-fence of Europe" WorldPress, 25 June 2009.
