= Ceuta Day =

Public holiday in Ceuta, Spain

Día de Ceuta
- Official name: Día de Ceuta
- Observed by: Ceuta, Spain
- Type: Regional holiday
- Date: September 2
- Next time: 2 September 2027
- Frequency: annual
- Related to: September 2 1415 – Pedro de Meneses, 1st Count of Vila Real), became the first Governor of Ceuta by King John I of Portugal

Ceuta Day (Spanish: Día de Ceuta), celebrated in Ceuta, Spain, on 2 September, is a holiday marking the date when Pedro de Meneses, 1st Count of Vila Real, became the first Governor of Ceuta by King John I of Portugal, following the Conquest of Ceuta.

== Legend ==
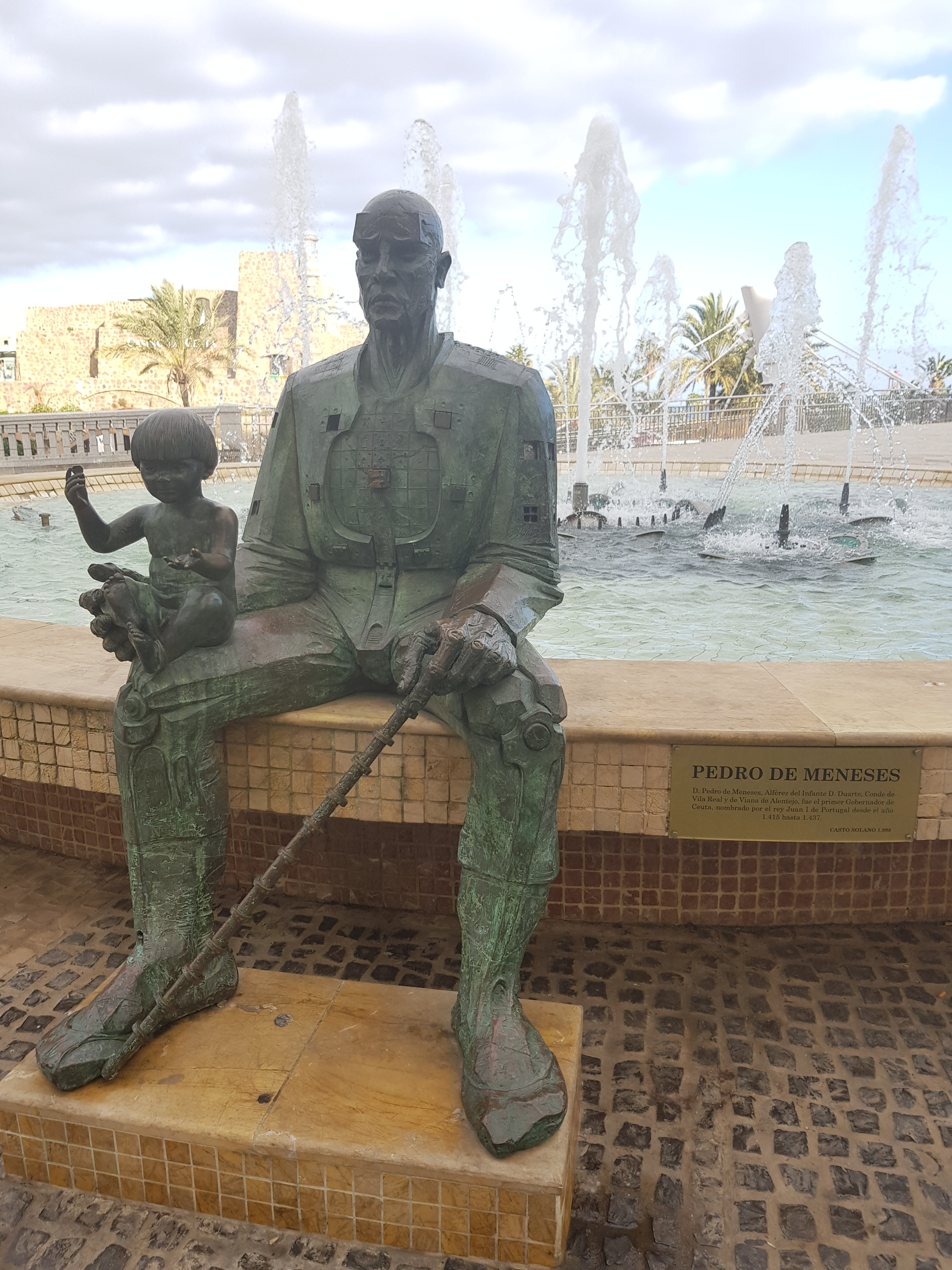
Statue of Pedro de Meneses, in Ceuta.

While John I of Portugal was canvassing for governors, the young Pedro was nearby, distractedly playing choca (a kind of Medieval hockey) with a stick of zambujeiro or Aleo (wild olive tree). Hearing all the high nobles making excuses to avoid taking the job, the young Pedro de Menezes stepped forward and approached the king with his gaming stick (aleo) in hand and told him that, with only that stick, he could defend Ceuta from all the power of Morocco. As a result of this story, all future Portuguese governors of Ceuta would be presented with a zambujeiro staff as a symbol of their office upon their investiture. The aleo that was used by Pedro is kept in the Church of Santa María de África in Ceuta. The statue of Mary holds the aleo.

'Aleu' or 'aleo' can be seen on the coat of arms of Alcoutim and Vila Real, where Pedro's descendants were made Counts of Alcoutim or Counts of Vila Real respectively.

== 2026 ==
On 2 September, usually celebrated as Ceuta Day, mass demonstrations were held across Spain in solidarity with Ceuta against the Sánchez government. Protests were held across Spain with hundreds of thousands of Spanish citizens protesting responding to a call by the nonpartisan Spanish Federation of Municipalities and Provinces. Protesters demanded accountability from Sánchez and his government because of their responsibility in creating the 2026 Ceuta migrant crisis with many calling for his resignation or prosecution.

Protests in cities across the country included Ceuta where around 20,000 citizens participated. In Madrid alone, around 50,000 citizens took part in the protest. In Valencia, there were around 25,000 protestors. In Malaga, local police estimated that there were between 120,000 and 140,000 citizens participating in the protest. In total, protests were held in over 200 towns and cities across Spain.
