= Fernando López de Olmedo =

Spanish military officer (died 2021)

Fernando López de Olmedo y Gómez (died 8 August 2021) was a Spanish military officer.

He served as the General Commander of Ceuta from 1998 to 2002. Notably, the Perejil Island crisis, a bloodless armed conflict between Spain and Morocco over the uninhabited Perejil Island, took place in July 2002 during his command.

== Biography ==
López de Olmedo had an extensive military career. He graduated as a member of the 16th class of the General Military Academy in Zaragoza. He served in the Spanish Mountain Units as a sky-climber and special operations member, where he achieved the rank of captain.

As a brigadier general, Fernando López de Olmedo served as the director of the Toledo Infantry Academy, a major Spanish Army military training center in Toledo.

Fernando López de Olmedo served as the Commander of Ceuta from 1998 to 2002. During his time as general commander, Fernando López de Olmedo sought to strengthen relations between the Spanish Legion and the Ceutan general public. He organized a number of cultural and athletic events. In December 1999, he held the Oath of Flag of the Four Cultures at the military barracks in García Aldave. He was Commander in charge of Ceuta during the 2002 Perejil Island crisis. He later recounted his experiences as commander during the crisis in his book, Ceuta and the Parsley Conflict (Ceuta y el conflicto del Perejil).

The government of Ceuta awarded him the Coexistence Award upon his retirement in 2002.

López de Olmedo died from COVID-19, which was complicated by pre-existing hemiparesis, at the Gómez Ulla Military Hospital in Madrid on 8 August 2021.
