= Isla de Isabel II =

Spanish island in the western Mediterranean

Isabel II Island
Isla de Isabel II
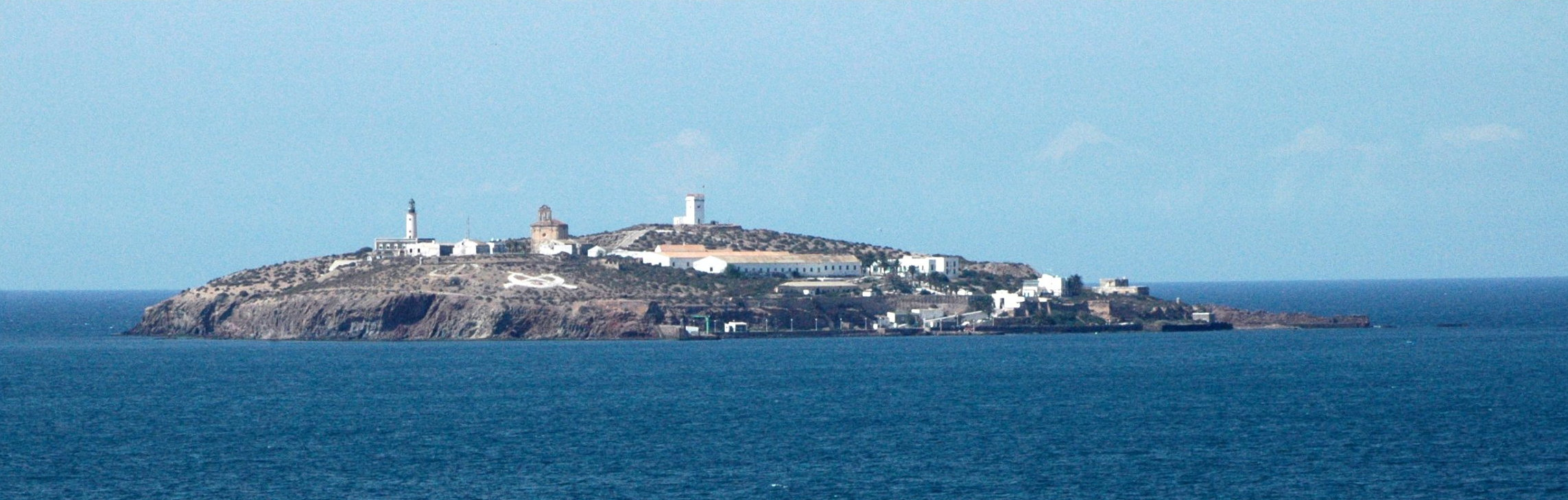
- The island as seen from the Moroccan coast.
- Interactive map of Isabel II Island

Geography
- Location: Alboran Sea
- Coordinates: 35°10′55″N 2°25′46″W
- Archipelago: Chafarinas Islands
- Area: 0.153 km^{2} (0.059 sq mi)
- Highest elevation: 35 m (115 ft)

Administration
- Spain

Isabel II Island (Spanish: Isla de Isabel II) is the central island of the Chafarinas Islands, in the Mediterranean Sea. The island is a part of Spain's plazas de soberanía and is under Spanish control, however it is also claimed by Morocco as part of its territory alongside other Spanish territories in North Africa. It is located only 4 kilometres (2.5 mi) away from the North-African shore, in front of the Moroccan town of Ras Kebdana. It has an area of 0.153 km^{2} (15.3 ha), and there is a military base and a church.

== Name ==
The name of the island comes from Isabella II, Queen of Spain from 1833 to 1868.

== Geography ==
Displaying a rounded shape, it has a total area of 0.153 square kilometres (0.059 sq mi). Substantially flatter than the Isla del Congreso, it reaches a maximum height of 35 metres above sea level.

== History ==
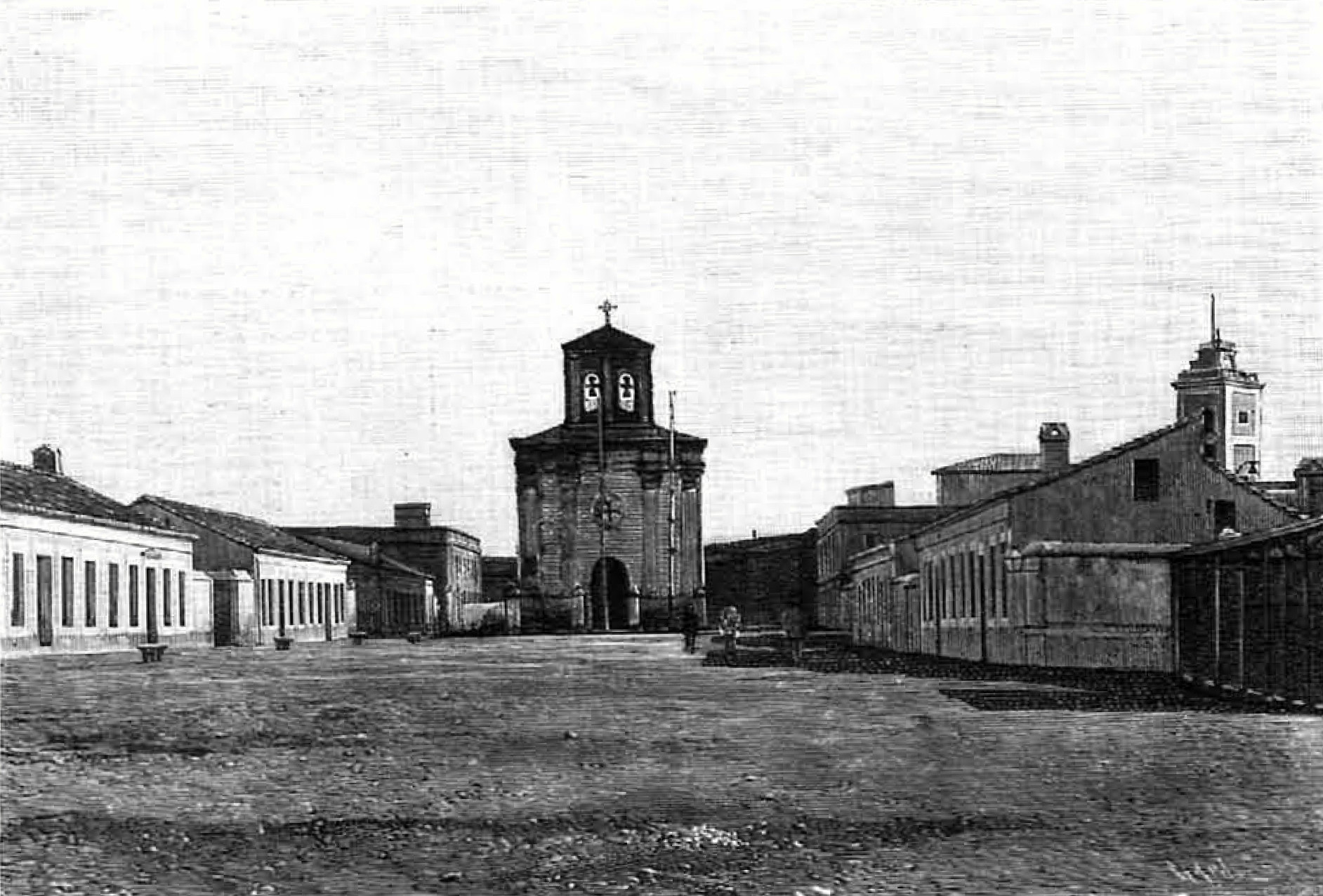
The church and other buildings as depicted in La Ilustración Española y Americana in 1893.

Archeological remains found in the island suggest the existence of an outpost intended for sheltering ships by the 1st century BC, a time when the North-African coastline thrived during the reign of Juba II.

Along with the other two islands of the archipelago (Isla del Rey and Isla del Congreso), it was occupied in 1848 by Spain, that alleged terra nullius, anticipating French intentions to do the same from Algeria. General Francisco Serrano took possession of the islands bringing two ships from Málaga.

The work of conditioning the island of Isabel II suffered a major setback after the passing of a strong storm in March 1849. Then the question arose of whether the stay in the archipelago was worth it or not.

Between 1910 and 1915 the island was connected through a dike with the Isla del Rey.

Electric lighting was installed on the island in 1922.

== Population ==
The island is the only inhabited island of the archipelago. It currently hosts a military garrison with personnel from the Ministry of Environment of Spain, as the islands are a National Reserve protected because of the wealth of their natural species.
