= Perejil =

Perejil may refer to:

- Perejil Island, an islet between Spain and Morocco
- Parsley Massacre, the genocide in which the pronunciation of "perejil" was used as a shibboleth
