= 2012 Peñón de Vélez de la Gomera incident =

Incident that involved Spain and Morocco

Peñón de Velez de la Gomera Incident
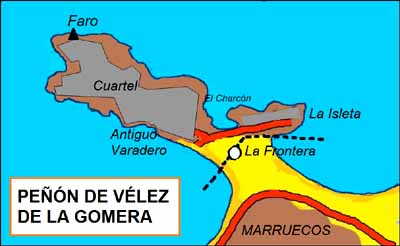
- Map of the Peñón de Velez de la Gomera and the border with Morocco
Date	29 August 2012
Location	Peñón de Velez de la Gomera (Spain)
Result	Spanish victory

Belligerents
Spain	Committee for the Liberation of Ceuta and Melilla

Commanders and leaders
Juan Carlos I	Yahya Yahya

Units involved
Melilla Regulars Group No. 52	Activists

Strength
	4 activists

Casualties and losses
	All activists arrested

The 2012 Peñón de Vélez de la Gomera incident was a territorial incident that involved Spain and Morocco, the second fought in the 21st century after the one that occurred on Perejil Island in 2002.

It took place at dawn on 29 August 2012, around 8:30 local Spanish time (6:30 in neighboring Morocco), after the occupation of the Peñón de Vélez de la Gomera by a group of activists from the Coordination Committee for the Liberation of Ceuta and Melilla commanded by the fugitive Yahya Yahya, alleged to be a domestic abuser by Spanish authorities, and mayor of the Moroccan town of Beni Ensar, who intended to place the Moroccan flag on top of the rock. After several warnings, four of the activists were arrested by the Spanish regulars who guard the territory, three of the assailants managed to escape to Moroccan territory.

== Escalation of diplomatic tension ==
The incident was preceded by constant messages from Morocco in 2011 about the sovereignty of several Spanish territories in North Africa, including the autonomous cities of Ceuta and Melilla.

The main person responsible for the incident, Yahya Yahya, who previously threatened a march on Ceuta or cut off the water supply to the city of Melilla, stated that the Coordination Committee for the Liberation of Ceuta and Melilla, which he chairs, has "hundreds of activists" ready to carry out similar actions in the near future on the Spanish rocks and islands located next to Morocco and which are claimed by this country. The Melilla courts demanded his extradition from Morocco for an alleged crime of gender violence.

In addition, Yahya Yahya declared that after the arrest of four of the Moroccan assailants, they were "handcuffed and lying on the ground", which was denied by the Government of Spain, adding that the detainees would be transferred by helicopter to the Spanish peninsular coasts.

The Delegation of the Government of Spain in Melilla accused the Moroccan activists of wanting to "strain and hinder" relations between Morocco and Spain, and argued that the measures used for their arrest were appropriate, reaffirming that no matter how many times they try to conquer Spanish territories, they will stand firm and end all assaults honestly and looking out for the protection of Spanish territory.

== See also ==
- Greater Morocco
- Morocco-Spain relations
- Perejil Island crisis
