= Peñón de Vélez de la Gomera =

Spanish tied island in North Africa

Disputed island Hajar Badis
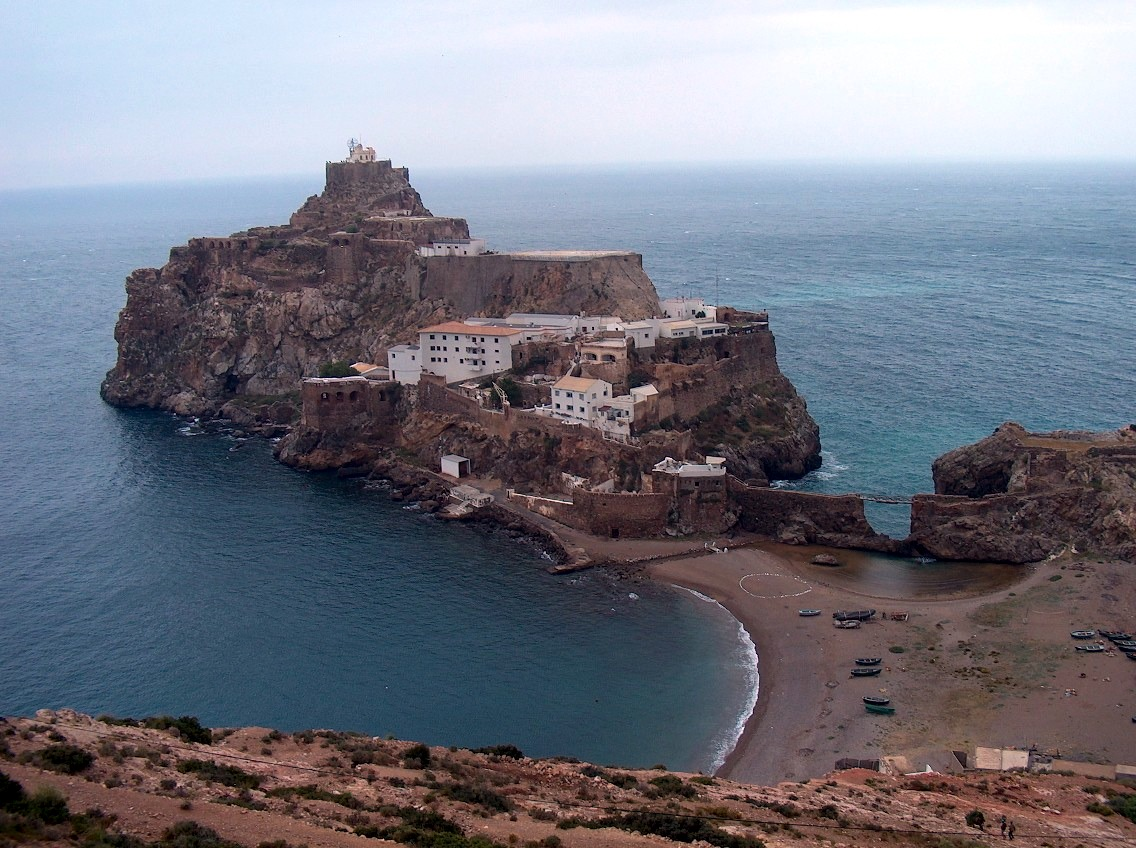
- Peñón de Vélez de la Gomera, seen from the Moroccan coast in 2007.
- Interactive map of Peñón de Vélez de la Gomera

Geography
- Location: North African coast
- Coordinates: 35°10′20″N 4°17′59″W
- Adjacent to: Mediterranean Sea
- Area: 1.9 ha (4.7 acres)

Administration
- Spain
- Plazas de Soberanía

Claimed by
- Morocco

Peñón de Vélez de la Gomera (Spanish pronunciation: [peˈɲon de ˈβeleθ ðe la ɣoˈmeɾa]), also known as Hajar Badis (Arabic: حجر بديس, romanized: Hajar Badis), is a Spanish tied island, exclave and former rocky tidal island in the western Mediterranean Sea. It is connected to the Moroccan shore by a sandy isthmus and to a smaller islet to the east, La Isleta, by a rocky isthmus. The tidal island was historically named Hajar Badis (Rock of Badis), referring to its proximity to the town of Badis.

Vélez de la Gomera, along with La Isleta, is a historic possession known as a plaza de soberanía ("stronghold of sovereignty"). It is administered by the Spanish central government and has a population consisting only of a small number of Spanish military personnel.

Its border with Morocco is 85 m (279 ft) long. Morocco asserts a claim to the peninsula as part of its territory, alongside other Spanish plazas de soberanía in North Africa.

== Geography ==
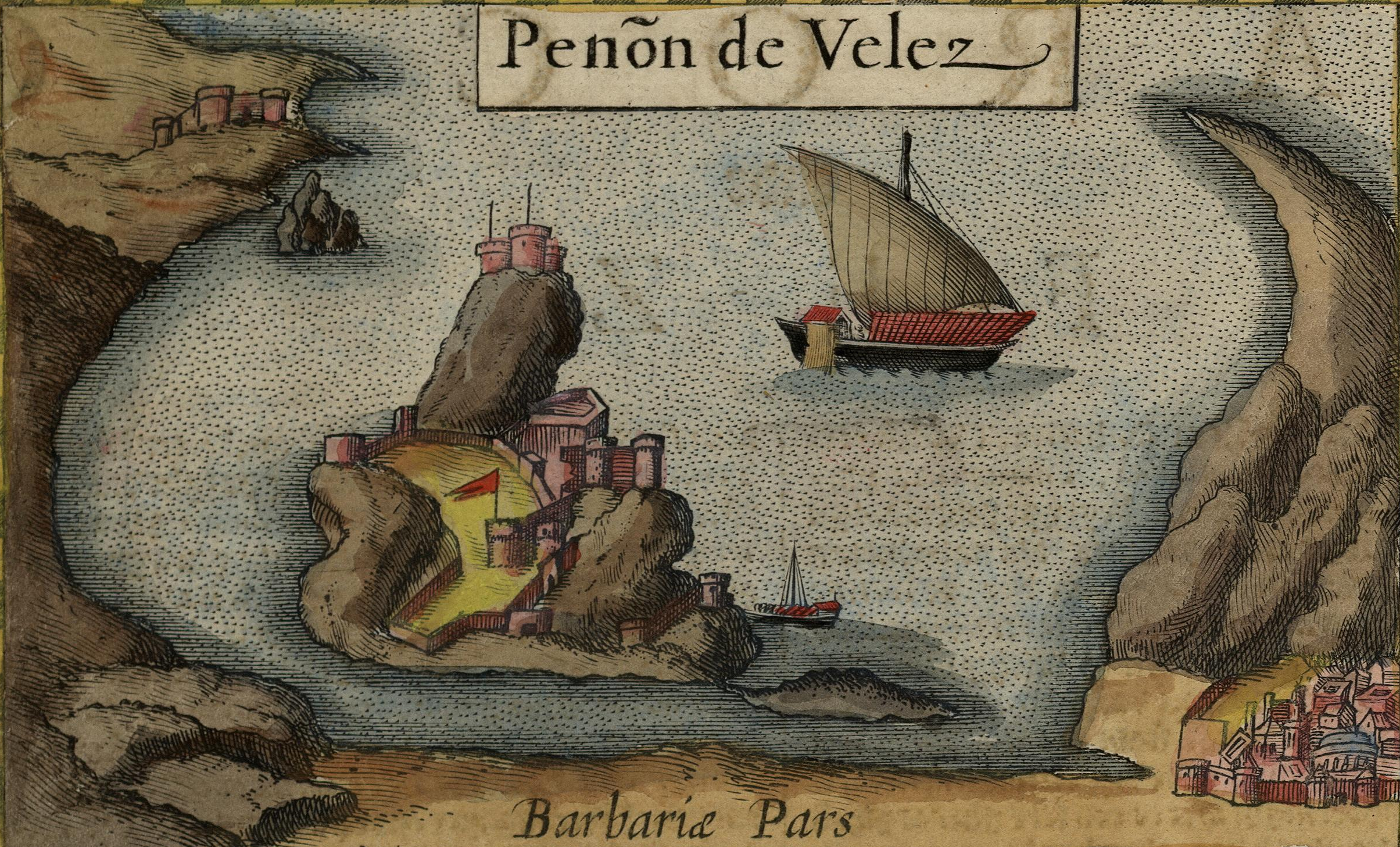
An illustrated inset showing Peñón de Vélez de la Gomera from Jodocus Hondius's 1606 map of Fez and the Kingdom of Morocco.

Peñón de Vélez de la Gomera is located 119 km (74 mi) southeast of Ceuta. It was a natural island in the Alboran Sea until 1930, when a huge thunderstorm washed large quantities of sand into the short channel between the island and the African continent. The channel was turned into a tombolo and the island became a peninsula, connected to the Moroccan coast by an 85 m (279 ft) long sandy isthmus, which is the world's shortest single land-border segment. With a length of 400 m (1,300 ft) northwest-southeast and a width of up to 100 m (330 ft), Peñón de Vélez de la Gomera covers about 1.9 ha (4¾ acres).

== History ==
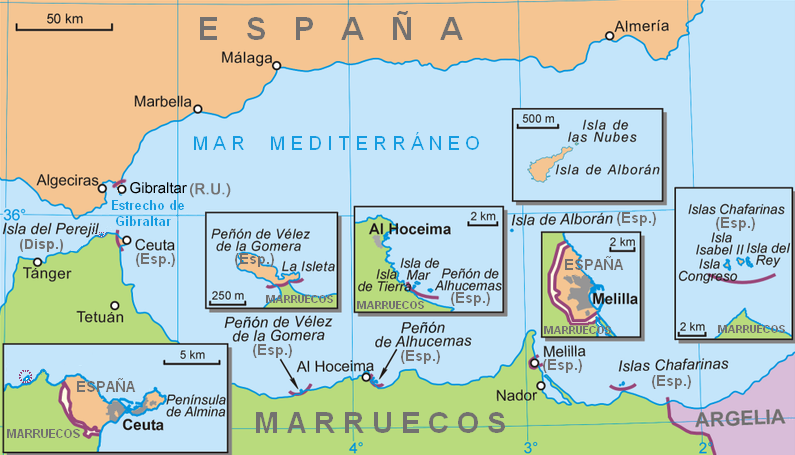
Current Spanish possessions in and near North Africa

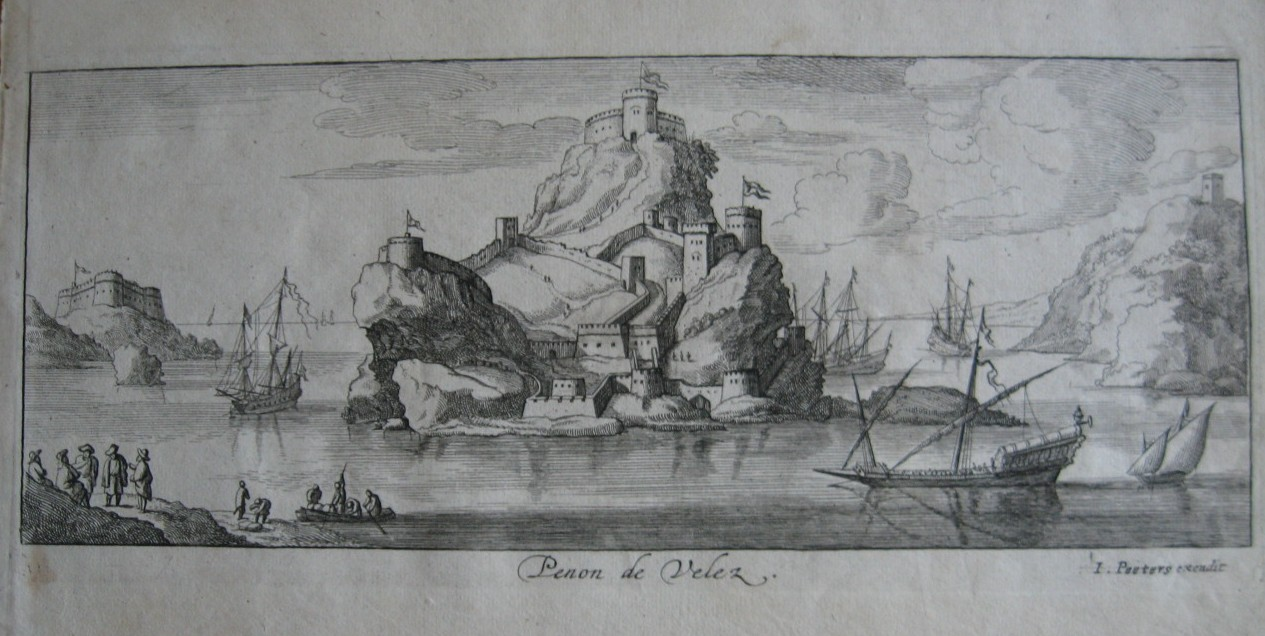
1692 engraving of the Peñón de Vélez de la Gomera, by Lucas Vostermans of Antwerp

Portugal and Spain passed an agreement in 1496 in which they effectively established their zones of influence on the North African coast. As a result, Spain could occupy territory only east of Peñón de Vélez. This restriction ended with the Iberian Union of Portugal and Spain in 1580 under Philip II after the 1578 Battle of Alcácer Quibir, when Spain started to take direct actions in the Saadi Sultanate, as in the occupation of Larache.

In 1508, Spain launched a successful expedition under the command of Pedro Navarro to take the peñón located near Badis, held by pirates who were constantly attacking and looting the coast of southern Spain.

In 1522, Spain lost the peñón to a Moroccan Berber attack that resulted in the deaths of the entire Spanish garrison. Ali Abu Hassun, the new Wattasid ruler of Morocco in 1554, then gave the peñón to the Ottoman troops who had assisted him in gaining the throne.

The Ottomans used Vélez de la Gomera as a base for corsairs operating in the region of the Strait of Gibraltar. The Sa'di sultan Abdallah al-Ghalib was alarmed by this activity, fearing that the Ottomans might use the town of Badis as a base from which to undertake the conquest of Morocco. In 1564, he forced the Moroccans to evacuate the town and the peñón, which he handed over to the Spaniards. The Moroccan population relocated to the kasbah of Senada.

In 2012, the territory was briefly assaulted by seven Moroccan activists belonging to the Committee for the Liberation of Ceuta and Melilla, whose leader was Yahya Yahya.

== Government ==
Peñón de Vélez de la Gomera is administered directly from Madrid.

== Transportation ==
The territory is reached primarily by helicopter via a helipad located on the upper sections. A landing area is located on the south end near the land entrance to Peñón de Vélez de la Gomera.

== See also ==
- Former island
- List of Spanish colonial wars in Morocco
- List of islands of Spain
- Morocco–Spain border
- Plazas de soberanía
- Spanish Protectorate of Morocco
- European enclaves in North Africa before 1830
