= Isla del Rey, Chafarinas =

Disputed island in Mediterranean Sea

Coordinates: 35°11′N 2°25′W

Isla del Rey
Disputed island
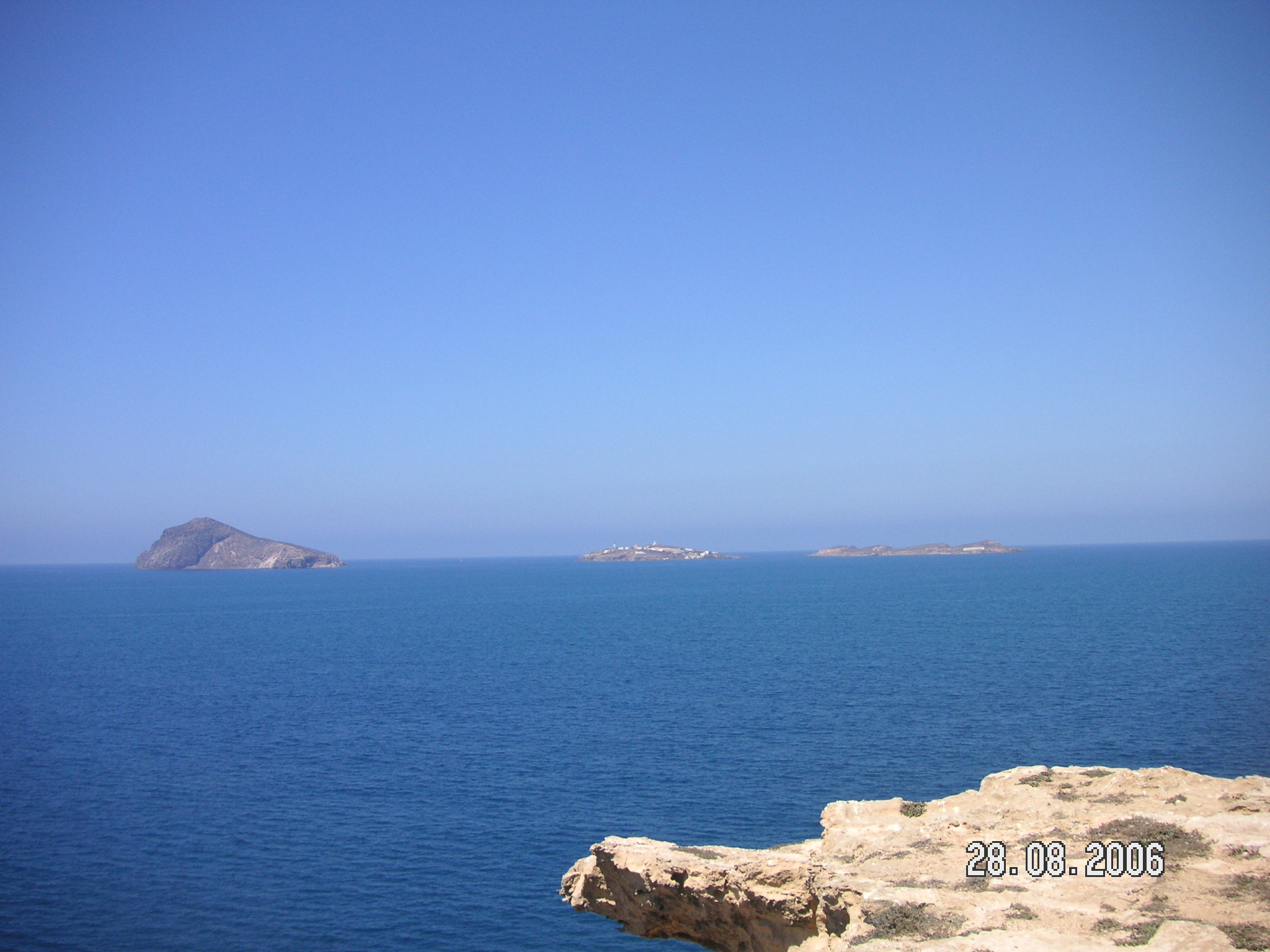
- Interactive map of Isla del Rey

Geography
- Archipelago: Chafarinas Islands
- Adjacent to: Mediterranean Sea
- Area: 0.116 km^{2} (0.045 sq mi)
- Highest elevation: 35 m (115 ft)

Administration
- Spain

Claimed by
- Morocco

Demographics
- Population: 0

Isla del Rey is one of the islands that are part of the archipelago of Chafarinas which are located in the Mediterranean Sea, along with the Isla del Congreso and the Isla de Isabel II. It is part of Spain's plazas de soberanía in North Africa. The island is administered by the Ministry of Defence of Spain, however it is also claimed by Morocco as part of its territory alongside other Spanish overseas territories in Northern Africa.
