= Committee for the Liberation of Ceuta and Melilla =

Moroccan irredentist group (2007–2014)

- Leader: Yahya Yahya
- Founded: 2007
- Dates active: 2007–2014
- Dissolved: 16 June 2014
- Ideology: Moroccan irredentism

The Committee for the Liberation of Ceuta and Melilla (CLCM) was a Moroccan irredentist organisation focused on Spain's plazas de soberanía. It was based on the irredentist idea of Greater Morocco.

== History ==
The Committee for the Liberation of Ceuta and Melilla was founded by members who defended the Greater Morocco irredentist idea. They wanted to carry it out as soon as possible through quick actions and media impact. Among the most famous actions of the committee were the robbery of the arm of the statue of Pedro de Estopiñán y Virués and the assault on Peñón de Vélez de la Gomera.

Most of the actions were carried out at the border between Spain and Morocco in Melilla, where committee members assaulted several Spanish police personnel. Both its leader and several activists of the organization were fined by the Moroccan authorities for these incidents.

Some members of the organization belonged to the Moroccan Liberal Party (MLP).

== Dissolution ==
The committee was dissolved on 16 June 2014 due to, according to its members, the lack of support from the Moroccan population. Its leader accused the Government of Morocco of hypocrisy and asked Spain for forgiveness for their actions.
