= Chafarinas Islands =

Spanish archipelago

Coordinates: 35°10′57″N 2°25′48″W

Disputed island Islas Chafarinas
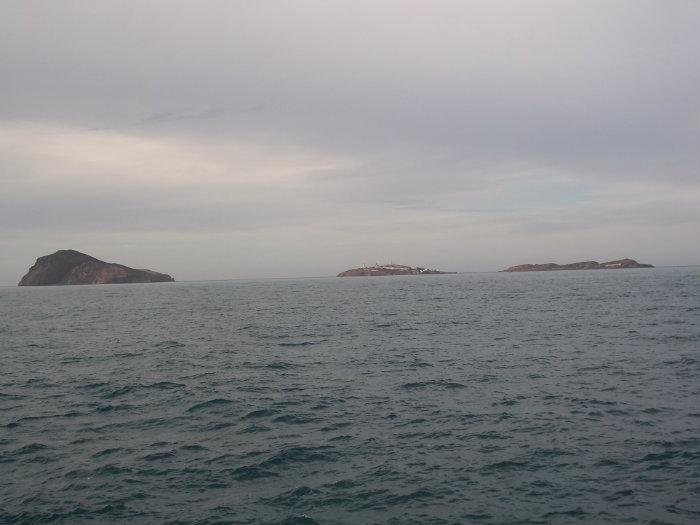
- Chafarinas Islands viewed from Morocco

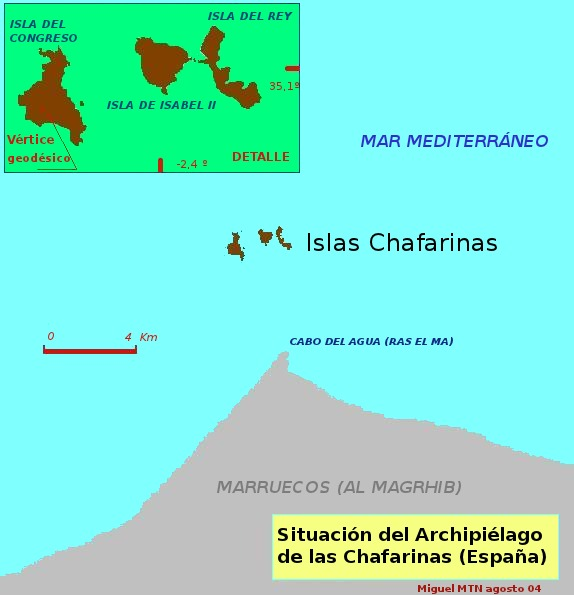

Geography
- Location: Mediterranean Sea
- Total islands: 3
- Major islands: Isla del Congreso; Isla Isabel II; Isla del Rey
- Area: 52.5 ha (130 acres)
- Highest point: 137 m

Administration
- Spain

Claimed by
- Morocco

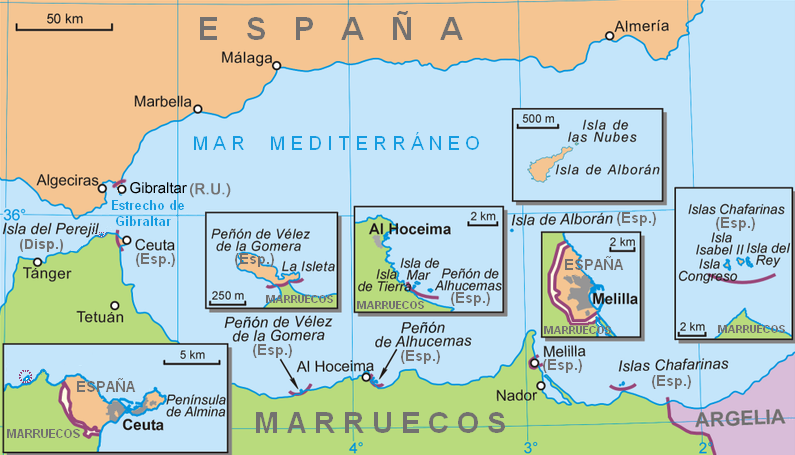
Spain's Plazas de soberanía in North Africa. The Islas Chafarinas are on the right.

The Chafarinas Islands, (Note: Spanish: Islas Chafarinas IPA: [ˈislas tʃafaˈɾinas] Tarifit: tazṛut n ikebdanen or taẓrut n icebdanen Arabic: جزر الشفارين or الجزر الجعفرية) also spelled Zafarin, Djaferin or Zafarani, are a group of three Spanish small islets located in the Alboran Sea off the coast of Africa with an aggregate area of 0.525 square kilometres (0.203 sq mi), 45 km (28.0 mi) to the east of Nador and 3.3 km (2.1 mi) off the Moroccan town of Ras Kebdana. They are uninhabited except for a garrison of the Spanish Army, though there was also a civilian population roughly between the mid-19th and mid-20th centuries.

The Chafarinas Islands are one of the Spanish territories in North Africa off the Moroccan coast known as plazas de soberanía. The islands are administered by Spain but also claimed by Morocco as part of its territory alongside other Spanish territories in North Africa.

== History ==
These offshore islands were probably the Tres Insulae of the Romans and the Zafrān of the Arabs. They were uninhabited and unclaimed in 1848, when the French government decided to occupy them, in order to monitor the tribes living in the border area between Morocco and French-ruled Algeria. A small expedition under the command of then Colonel MacMahon left Oran by sea and by land in January 1848 to take possession of the islands. Forewarned by its consul in Oran, Spain, which also coveted the Chafarinas, quickly dispatched a warship to the islands from Málaga. When the French arrived, the Spaniards had already taken possession of the islands in the name of Queen Isabella II.

== Geography ==
The Chafarinas Islands are made up of three islands (from west to east, with areas in hectares):

- Isla del Congreso (25.6 ha)
- Isla de Isabel II (15.3 ha) (with garrison)
- Isla del Rey (11.6 ha).

Under Spanish control since 1847, there is a 30-man military garrison on Isla Isabel II, the only stable population on the small archipelago, down from 426 people in 1900 and 736 people in 1910. Small numbers of scientists, anti-trafficking police, and other authorized personnel sometimes increase the population to around 50.

== Natural history ==
The islands had relevance in Spanish environmentalist circles during the 1980s and 1990s, as the last individual of Mediterranean monk seal in Spanish territory lived there until it disappeared in the 1990s. Nine out of eleven of its marine invertebrates are considered endangered species and it is the home of the second largest colony of endangered Audouin's gull in the world. The islands have been recognised as an Important Bird Area (IBA) by BirdLife International because they support, as well as the Audouin's gull colony, a breeding colony of Scopoli's shearwaters, with some 800–1,000 breeding pairs estimated in 2001–2004.

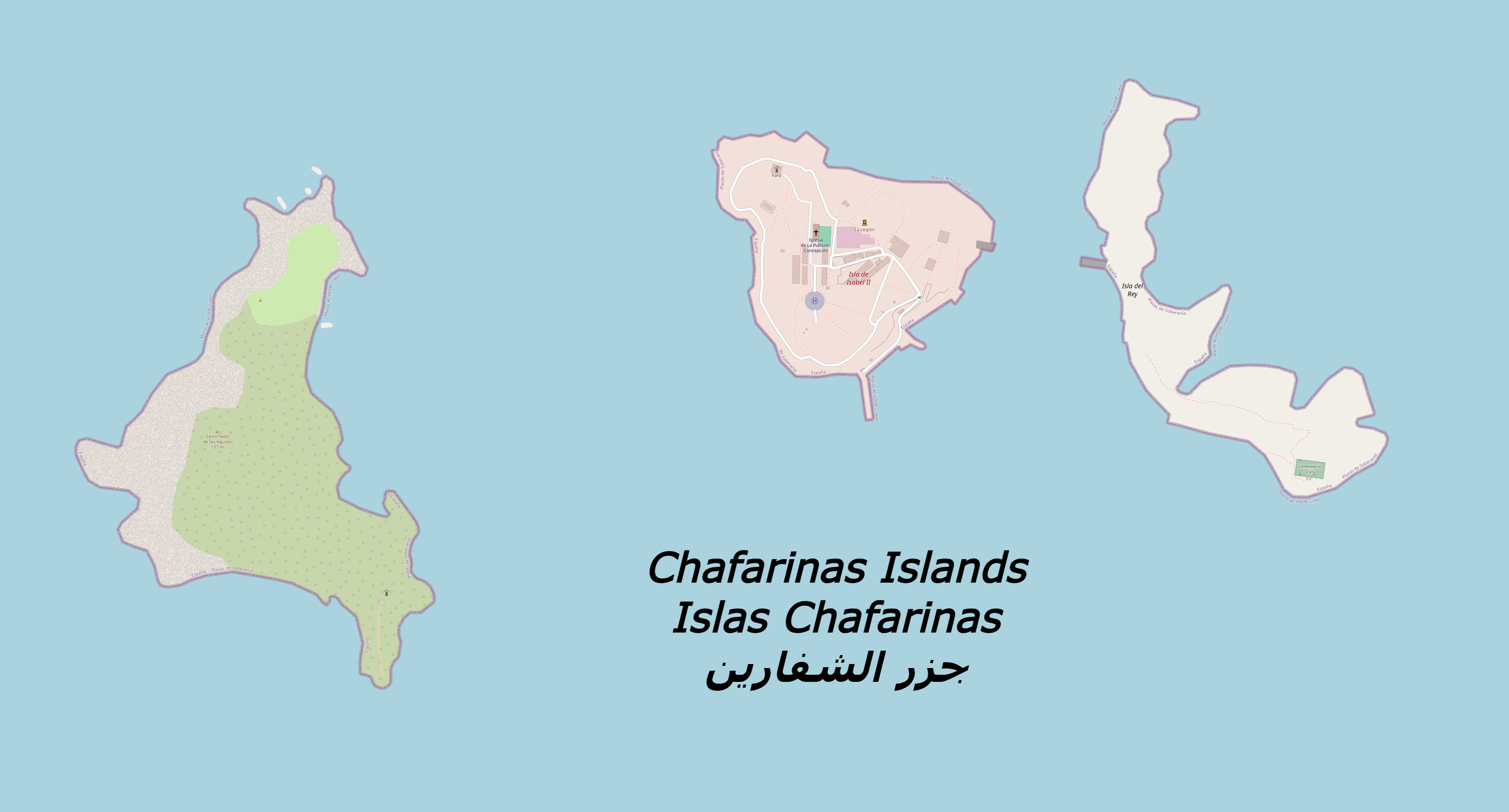
Map of Chafarinas Islands

== Gallery ==
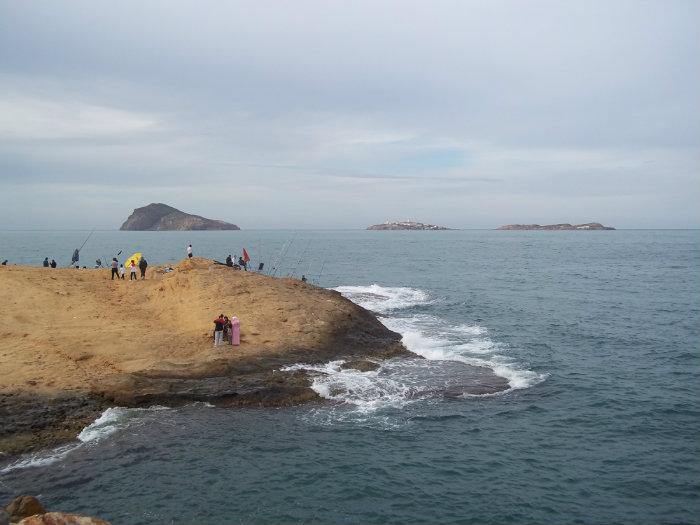
Islas Chafarinas as seen from Cabo de Agua

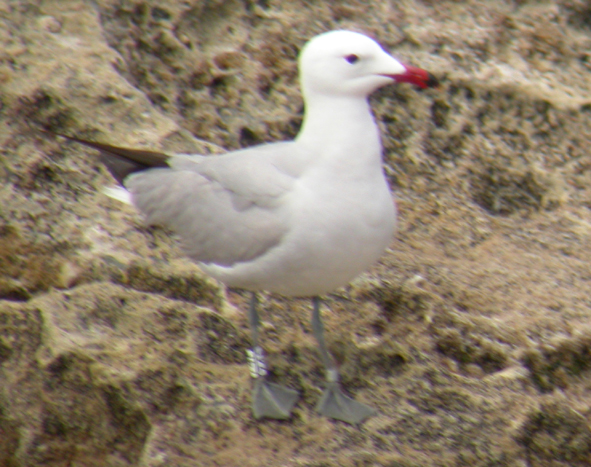
Audouin's gull, a Vulnerable species breeding on the islands

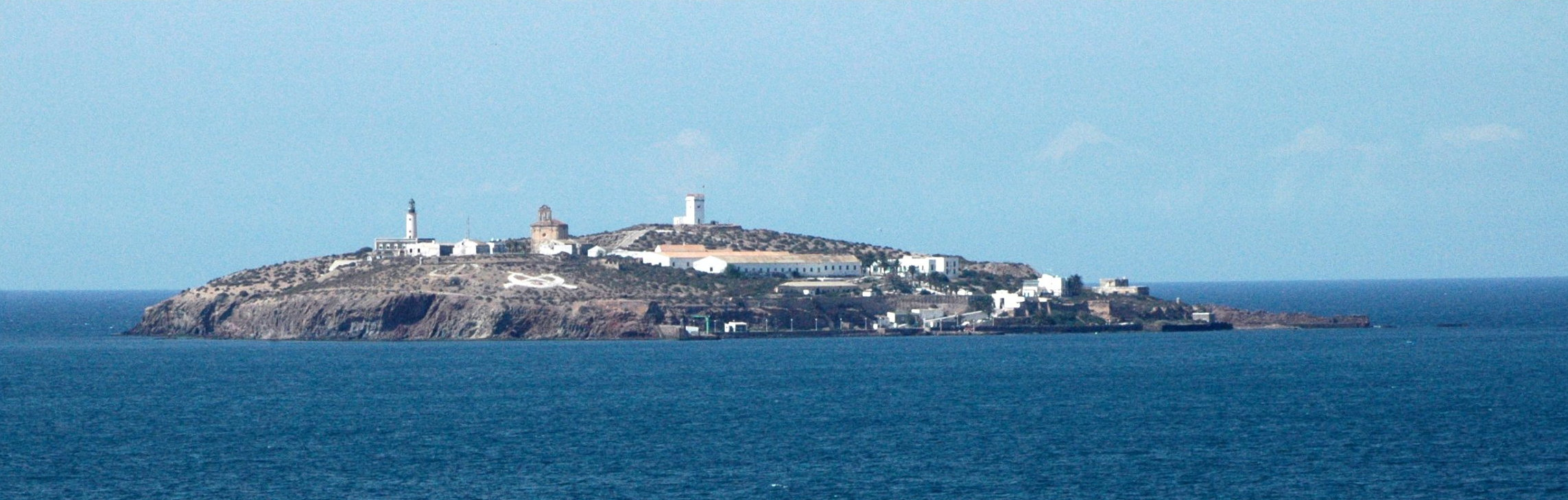
Island of Isabel II

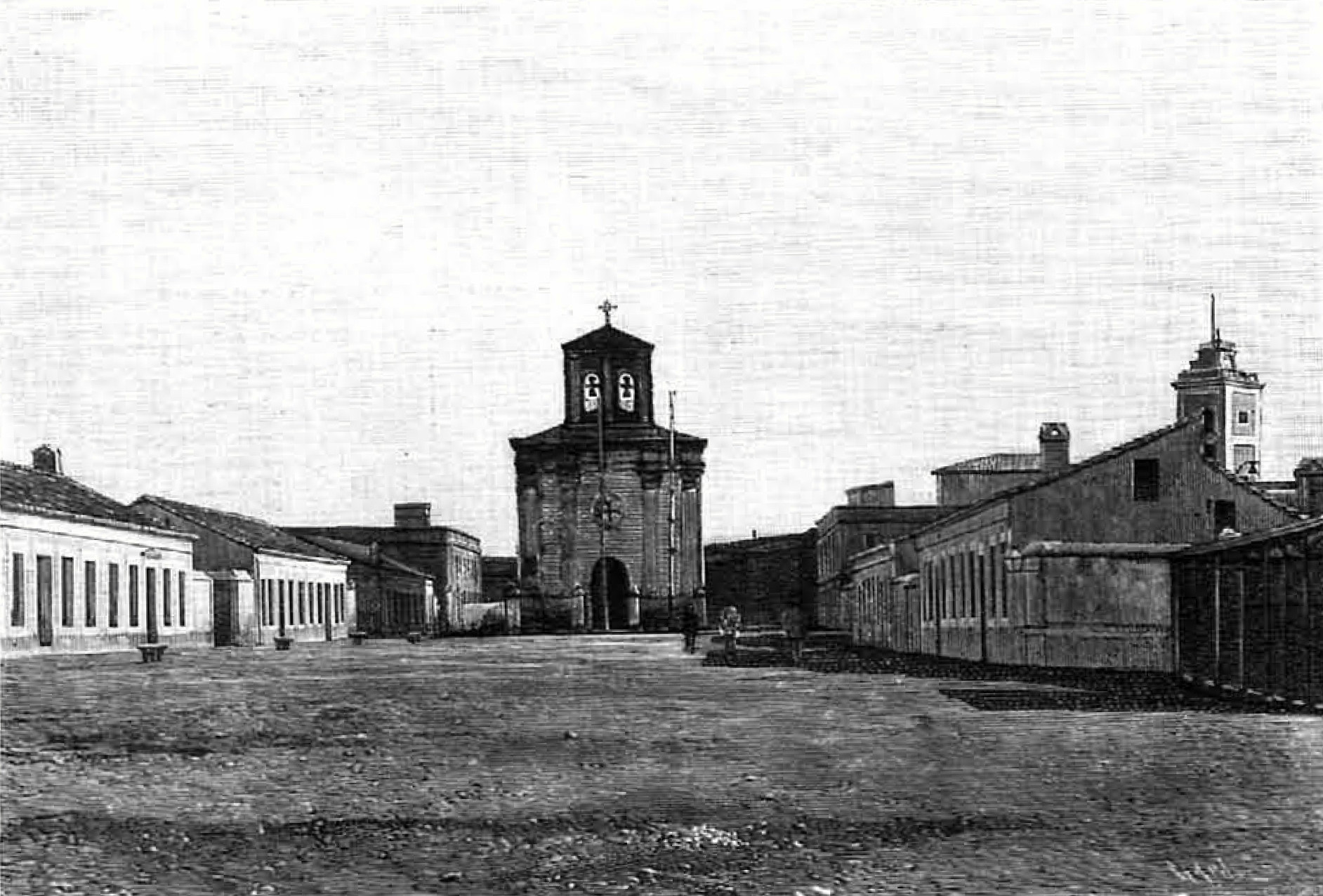
Church of la Purísima Concepción on the island of Isabel II in 1893

Coat of arms of the Chafarinas Islands

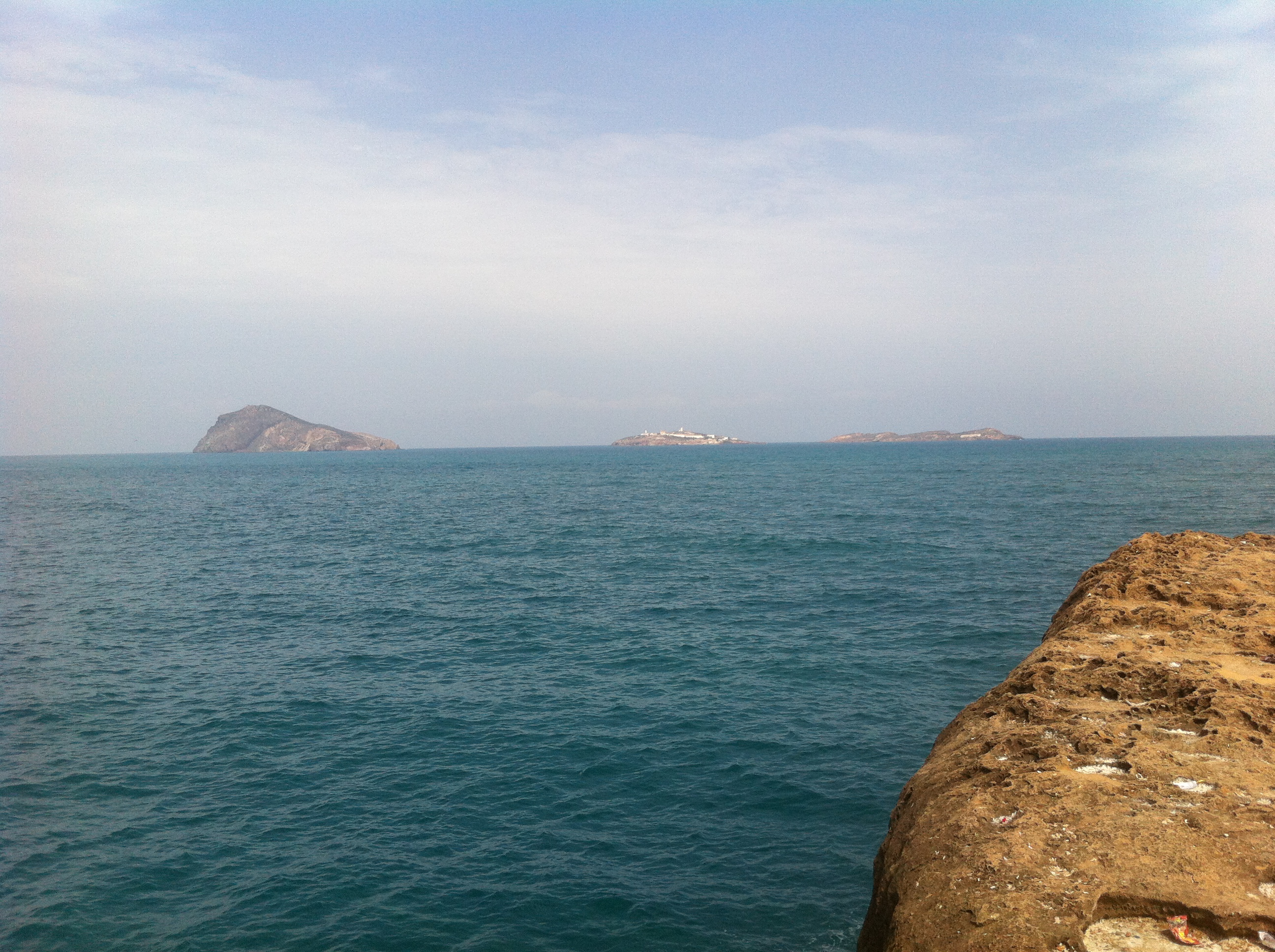
Chafarinas Islands viewed from Ras El Ma, Morocco

== See also ==
- Plazas de soberanía
- List of islands of Spain
- List of Spanish Colonial Wars in Morocco
- Spanish protectorate in Morocco
