= Plazas de soberanía =

Spanish territories along the northern African coast

Plazas de soberanía Plazas de soberanía española en el norte de África
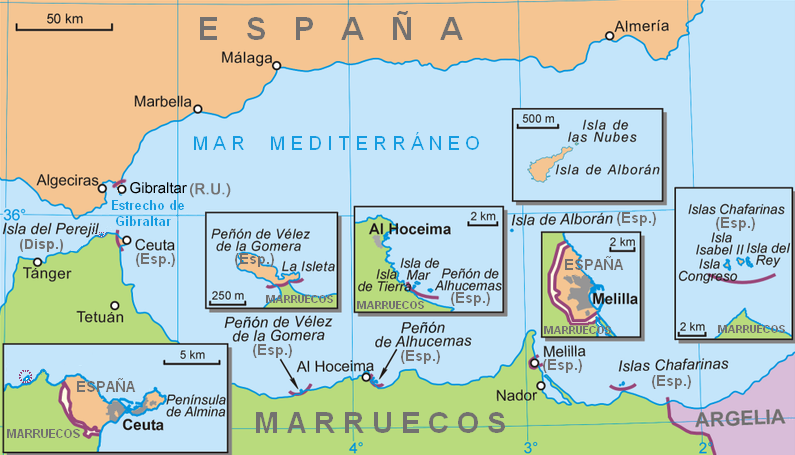
- The plazas de soberanía, plus Ceuta (with Perejil Island (Note: Isla de Perejil (in Spanish))) and Melilla on the mainland, and Alboran Island (Note: Isla de Alborán (in Spanish)) (with Nube Islet (Note: Islote de La Nube (in Spanish))) approx. 50 km north of the African coast
- Country: Spain

Government
  - Type: De facto unincorporated area under the administration of the Ministry of Defence

Area
  - Total: 0.40 km^{2} (0.15 sq mi)

Population
  - Total: 0
- Time zone: UTC+01:00 (CET)
  - Summer (DST): UTC+02:00 (CEST)

The plazas de soberanía (Spanish pronunciation: [ˈplaθas ðe soβeɾaˈni.a]), meaning "strongholds of sovereignty", are a series of Spanish territories scattered along the Mediterranean coast bordering Morocco, closer to Africa than to Europe. This term is used for those territories that have been a part of Spain since the formation of the modern country (1492–1556), as opposed to African territories acquired by Spain during the 19th and early 20th centuries in the Scramble for Africa.

Historically, a distinction was made between the so-called "major places of sovereignty", comprising the autonomous cities of Ceuta and Melilla, and the "minor places of sovereignty", referring to a number of uninhabited islands and a small peninsula along the coast. Now the term refers mainly to the latter. Ceuta in particular was also historically part of the so-called "African Algarve" (Spanish: Algarbe Africano, Portuguese: Algarve Africano) within the Kingdom of the Algarves, a title which the Spanish monarchs still hold in pretense.

Morocco has claimed those territories (except the island of Alborán, further away from Africa) since its independence in 1956. A rise in nationalist sentiment in Morocco can be attributed to this ongoing tension, as well as an appeal to the decolonial objective in the Charter of the United Nations.

== History ==
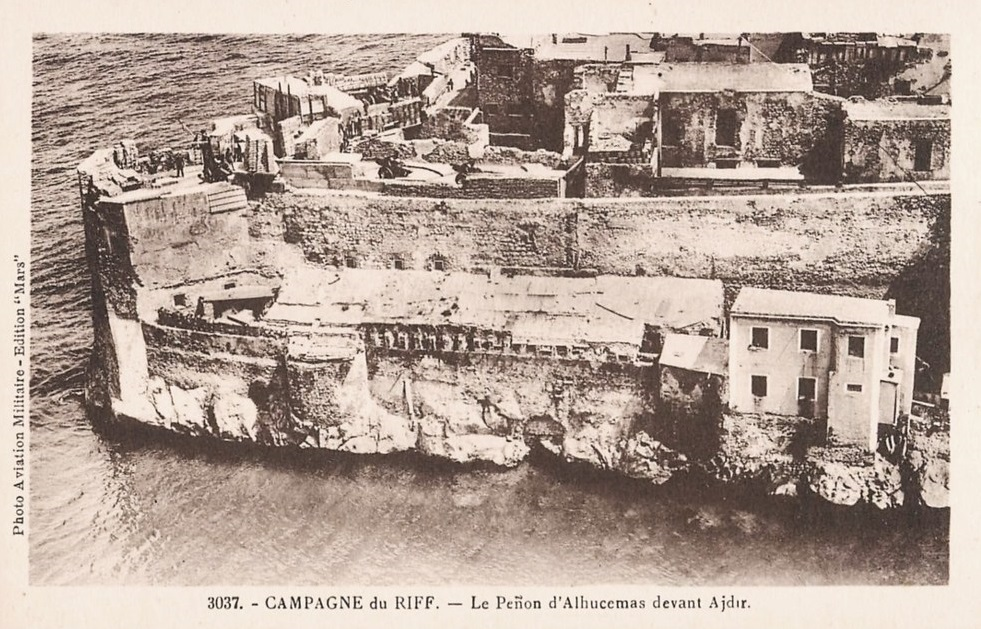
Aerial view of the Peñón de Alhucemas c. 1925

During the Reconquista and mainly following the conquest of Granada in 1492, forces of the Castilian and Portuguese kingdoms conquered and maintained numerous posts in North Africa for trade and as a defence against Barbary piracy.

In August 1415, the Portuguese conquered the city of Ceuta. In 1481, the papal bull Aeterni regis had granted all land south of the Canary Islands to Portugal. Only this archipelago and the possessions of Santa Cruz de la Mar Pequeña (1476–1524), Melilla (conquered by Pedro de Estopiñán in 1497), Villa Cisneros (founded in 1502 in current Western Sahara), Mazalquivir (1505), Peñón de Vélez de la Gomera (1508), Oran (1509–1708; 1732–1792), Algiers (1510–1529), Bugia (1510–1554), Tripoli (1511–1551), and Tunis (1535–1569) remained Spanish territory in Africa. Finally, following the independence of Portugal after the end of the Spanish-led Iberian Union, Ceuta was ceded by Portugal to Spain in 1668.

In 1848, Spanish troops conquered the Islas Chafarinas. In the late 19th century, after the so-called Scramble for Africa, European nations had taken over colonial control of most of the African continent. The justification for the ownership of the protectorates by Spain was guided by a colonial ideology, claiming to be on a civilizing mission. Spain had already lost much of its colonial influence in Latin America, at a time when colonial influence was seen as a marker of strength in Europe.

The Hispano-Moroccan War of 1860 resulted in a renewed interest by Spain in holding the territories, especially Ceuta. The war left Morocco in financial disrepair, and the subsequent Treaty of Wad Ras was signed between Spain and Morocco with this disadvantage. In the aftermath of the conflict, Spain declared Ceuta and Melilla to be perpetual territories, as well as establishing in the treaty the recognition of sovereignty by Morocco over the Chafarinas Islands.

The Treaty of Fez (signed on 30 March 1912) made most of Morocco a protectorate of France, while Spain assumed the role of protecting power over the northern part, called Spanish Morocco. When Spain relinquished its protectorate and recognized Morocco's independence in 1956, it did not give up these minor territories, as Spain had held them well before the establishment of its protectorate. The move to "nationalize" the plazas has been guided by a nationalist sentiment from the Spanish government, to legitimize the sovereignty over the territories. Ceuta and Melilla have become the target of a campaign to justify the ownership based on the geographical heritage of the Classical Antiquity era.

The Spanish protectorate and the plazas de soberanía are understood to be different, especially since the strongholds remained under Spanish rule after the end of the protectorate. France similarly sought to remain in control of Morocco after independence, with a continuation of French rule given through the rationale of advancement of Moroccan interests. Morocco is contemporaneously affected by the effects of continued French rule after independence, and the continued stronghold by the Spanish government with Ceuta and Melilla.

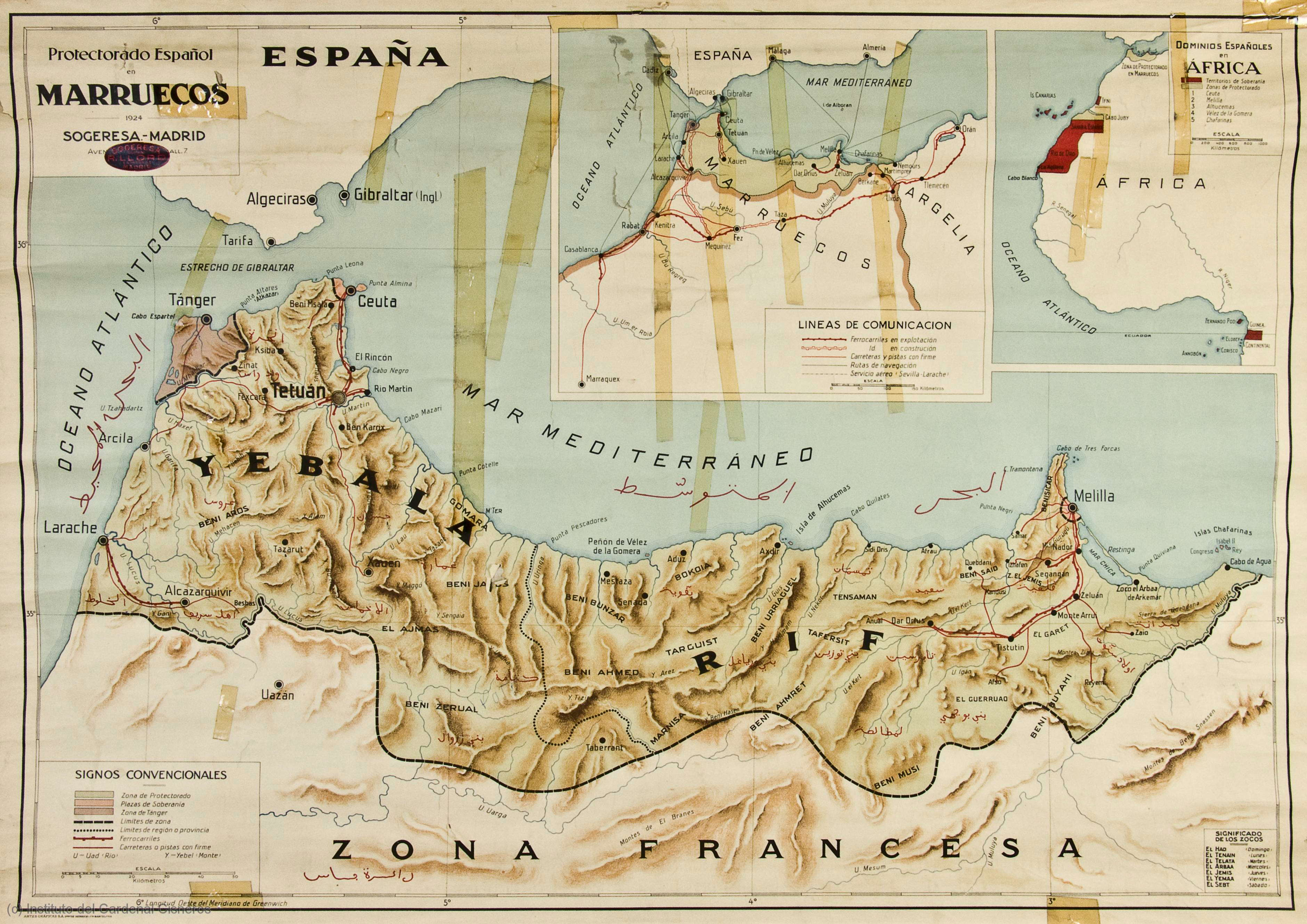
Map of Spanish Morocco in 1925

On 11 July 2002, Morocco stationed six gendarmes on Perejil Island, which was at the time a source of complaint by Spain. The Spanish Armed Forces responded by launching a military operation code-named Operation Romeo-Sierra. The operation was carried out by Spanish commandos of Grupo de Operaciones Especiales.

The Spanish Navy and Air Force provided support; the six Moroccan navy cadets did not offer any resistance and were captured and evicted from the island. It has since been evacuated by both countries.

On 3 January 2020, 42 migrants went to the Chafarinas Islands; the Civil Guard ordered their immediate expulsion without following the legal procedure. The Spanish NGO 'Walking Border' denounced the "hot returns," or expulsions without due process, as violations of international law. Strict immigration policy over the plazas de soberanía has made it so that only certain immigrants are welcomed to the strongholds. Stigma surrounding the background of the people crossing the Mediterranean to arrive to the shores of the strongholds have informed the harsh response to this influx of immigrants and refugees. The most extreme recent example of "hot returns" is the 2026 Morocco-Spain border incident.

== Physical geography ==
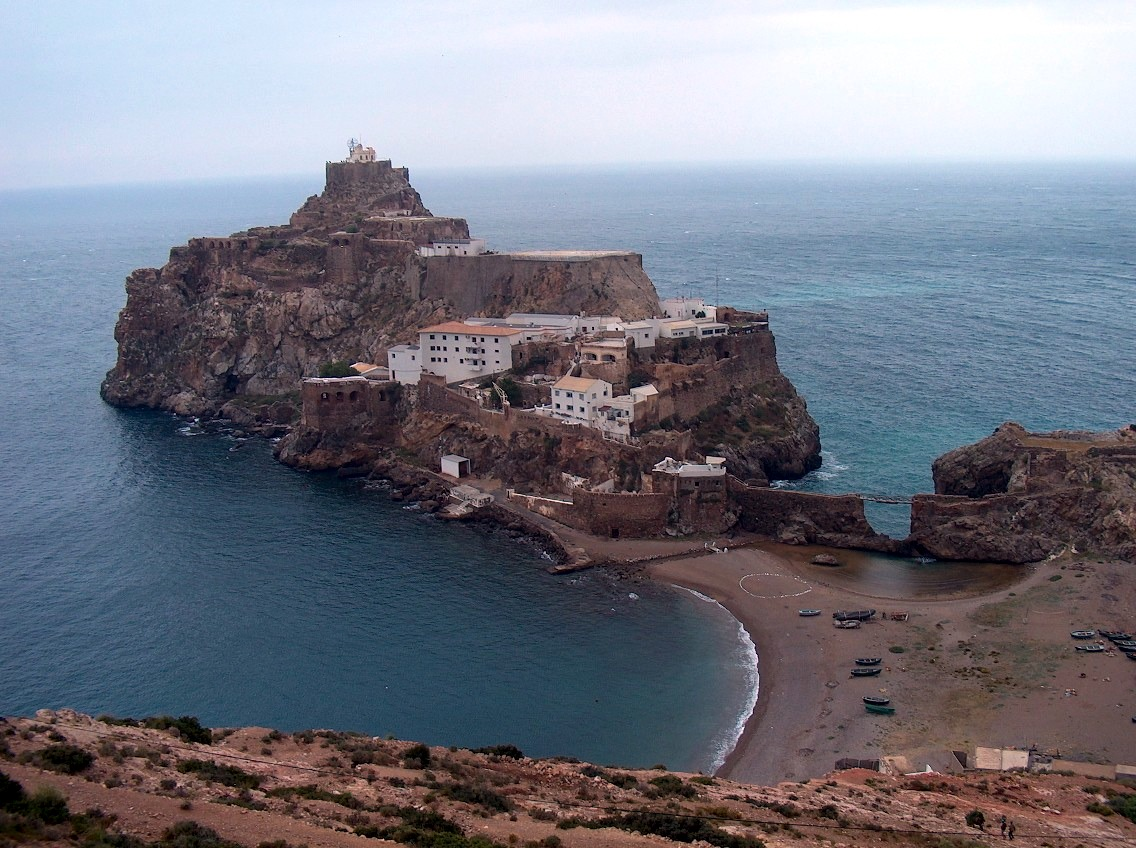
Peñón de Vélez de la Gomera, seen from the Moroccan coast, 2007. Its border with Morocco is 85 m (279 ft) long, making it the shortest international land border segment in the world.

In addition to Ceuta and Melilla, there are historically several minor plazas de soberanía:

Territory (Note: In order from north to south.)	Area (ha)	Coordinates
Alhucemas Islands	4.3	35°12′54″N 3°53′47″W
Isla de Mar	1.4	35°13′3.65″N 3°54′2.69″W
Isla de Tierra	1.8	35°12′55.83″N 3°54′8.10″W
Peñón de Alhucemas	1.1	35°12′48″N 3°53′21″W
Chafarinas Islands	34.0	35°11′N 2°26′W
Isla de Isabel II	10.2	35°10′55.77″N 2°25′46.90″W
Isla del Rey	8.6	35°10′51.72″N 2°25′24.96″W
Isla de Perejil		
Isla del Congreso	15.2	35°10′43.90″N 2°26′28.31″W
Peñón de Vélez de la Gomera	1.9	35°10′21.29″N 4°18′2.89″W

Alboran Island (Isla de Alborán), another small island in the western Mediterranean, approx. 50 kilometres (31.05 miles) from the African coast and 90 kilometres (55.92 miles) from continental Europe, is administered as a part of the municipality of Almería on the Iberian Peninsula.

== Political geography ==
The plazas de soberanía are small islands and a peninsula off the coast of Morocco (the only peninsula, Peñón de Vélez de la Gomera, was an island until a 1934 storm formed a sand bridge with the mainland). They are guarded by military garrisons and administered directly by the Spanish central government.

Like Ceuta and Melilla, they are all parts of Spain, therefore also parts of the European Union, with their currency being the euro. In this sense, the EU has contributed significantly to the fencing and security of the borders between the plazas and Morocco, with the goal of preventing illegal immigration.

== See also ==
- European enclaves in North Africa before 1830
- List of islands of Spain
- List of Spanish colonial wars in Morocco
- Morocco–Spain border
- Nadim al-Maghrebi
- Treaty of Wad Ras
- Spanish protectorate in Morocco
