= Yahya Yahya =

Moroccan politician and fugitive

- Born: March 9, 1967 (age 59); Melilla, Spain
- Occupation: Politician
- Known for: 2012 Peñón de Vélez de la Gomera incident
- Political party: Al-'Ahd Party

Yahya Yahya (born March 9, 1967) is a Moroccan politician. He was a senator of the kingdom of Morocco and former mayor of Beni Ansar, as well as co-president of the Spanish-Moroccan Friendship Commission. He has dual Moroccan and Dutch nationality. He is one of the main promoters of the Moroccan claim on his hometown, as well as on Ceuta. He is linked to the Moroccan Sahara Association.

Yahya Yahya was born in Melilla on March 9, 1967, the son of a Moroccan father and a Dutch mother. He studied law at the University of Granada. In 2004 he was a member of the Moroccan House of Councilors (upper chamber of the Moroccan legislature, elected by indirect suffrage), belonging to the Socialist Union of Popular Forces, the date on which he was appointed co-president of the Spanish-Moroccan Friendship Commission created by the upper chambers of Spain and Morocco. His goal was to "improve relations between two friendly and neighboring countries and start a new stage of dialogue." In 2009, already a member of the Al Ahd party, he was elected mayor of the city of Beni Ensar, bordering Melilla.

He has been involved in several legal proceedings and convicted of crimes in Spain (for an event of domestic violence that occurred at his home in Melilla on November 9, 2006) and Italy ("rebellion and injuries" to a public official and gender violence with sexual assault on August 4, 2008). His supporters argue that these police and judicial problems are conspiracies by the Spanish and Italian secret services to discredit him. He was involved in the diplomatic conflict between Spain and Morocco in 2007 and occupied water wells in Melilla during the crisis over the eviction of the Saharawi camp in Agdaym Izik. He also led the assault on the Peñón del Vélez de la Gomera in 2012.

In 2014, after a sentence from the Moroccan justice system, he resigned as mayor of Beni Ansar and dissolved the Committee for the Liberation of Ceuta and Melilla, of which he was president. He also resigned as senator due to, according to him, lack of official Moroccan reaction to an alleged Spanish insult to the King of Morocco, the interception and boarding of the Moroccan royal yacht by the Guardia Civil while it was sailing in Spanish waters. In 2015, he was identified at the Melilla airport by the police, but he was not arrested as he had apparently resolved his problems with the Spanish justice system.
