= Perejil Island crisis =

2002 Spanish–Moroccan conflict

- Part of Morocco–Spain relations
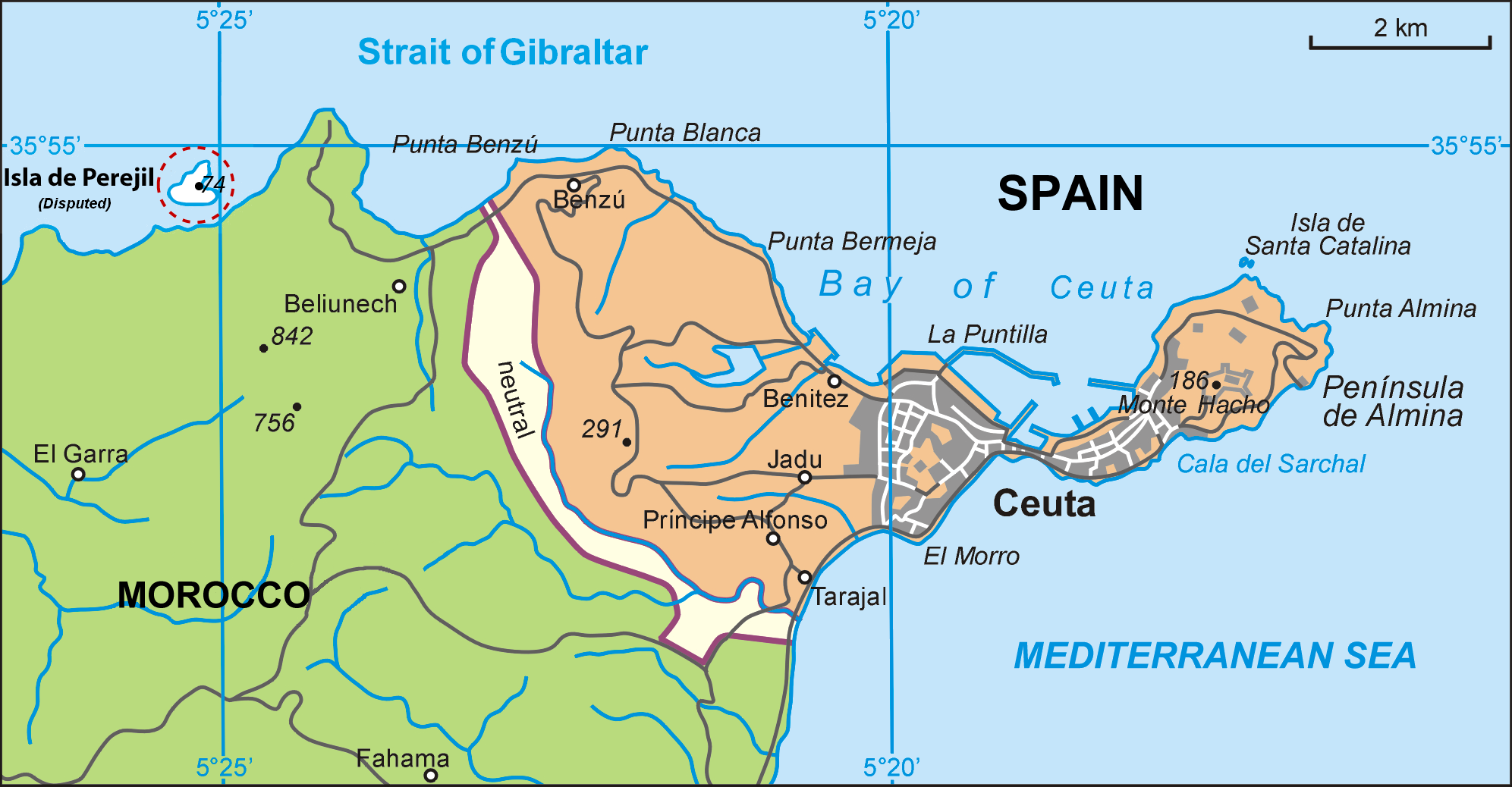
- Perejil Island at far left, near Ceuta
Date	11–18 July 2002
Location	Perejil Island 35°54′50″N 5°25′08″W
Result	Spanish victory: Status quo ante bellum

Belligerents
Spain	Morocco

Commanders and leaders
(Spain) Juan Carlos I; (Spain) José María Aznar; (Spain) Federico Trillo; (Spain) Ángel Acebes	(Morocco) Mohammed VI; (Morocco) Abdelrahman Yusufi; (Morocco) Ahmed Al-Midawi

Units involved
Spanish Navy; Spanish Air and Space Force; GOE; Spanish Legion; Civil Guard	(Morocco) Royal Navy; Auxiliary Forces

Strength
48 soldiers List: 4 AS-532 Cougar; 3 UH-1N; Mirage F-1 fighters; F/A-18 fighters; Castilla (L-52); Numancia (F-83); Navarra (F-85); Baleares (F-71); Asturias (F-74); Infanta Elena (F-32); Cazadora (F-35)	12 police officers

Casualties and losses
None	12 captured (released on the same day)

The Perejil Island crisis (Spanish: Incidente de la Isla de Perejil; Arabic: أزمة جزيرة تورة) was a bloodless armed conflict between Spain and Morocco that took place on 11–18 July 2002. The incident took place over the small, uninhabited Perejil Island, when a squad of the Royal Moroccan Navy occupied it. After an exchange of declarations between both countries, the Spanish troops eventually evicted the Moroccan infantry who had relieved their Navy comrades.

== Background ==
Perejil Island (Spanish: Isla de Perejil, Arabic: تورة, romanized: Tūra) is a small rocky island under Spanish sovereignty, lying 250 metres (270 yd) from Morocco, and 8 kilometres (5.0 mi) from the Spanish city of Ceuta, which borders Morocco, and 13.5 kilometres (8.4 mi) from mainland Spain. The island itself is unpopulated, only seldom visited by Moroccan shepherds.

== Moroccan seizure ==
Tensions rose on 11 July 2002, when Morocco occupied the island. Twelve Moroccan marines landed on the island, equipped with light arms, a radio, and several tents. The soldiers raised their nation's flag and set up camp. A patrol boat of the Spanish Civil Guard, in charge of coast guard service in Spain, approached the island from Ceuta during its routine check, when the crew spotted the Moroccan flag flying. The officers disembarked to investigate the issue. When they landed on the island, they were confronted by the Moroccan soldiers, who forced them back into their boat at gunpoint after a bitter argument.

Morocco claimed that the occupation was carried out in order to monitor illegal immigration, and to fight drug dealers and smugglers who use the island as a logistic platform. Following protests and calls to the return of the status quo from the Spanish government, the marines were called off, but were replaced by twelve soldiers of the Royal Moroccan Gendarmerie, who set up a fixed base on the island, which drew further protests from Spain. A Moroccan patrol boat was also deployed to the area, and was seen carrying out maneuvers near the Chafarinas Islands. Spain reacted by deploying a frigate, three corvettes, and a submarine to Ceuta and Melilla, and three patrol boats to the vicinity of Perejil island, stationing them about a mile off the island. Reinforcements were also sent to isolated Spanish outposts in the area.

Spanish Prime Minister José María Aznar warned Morocco that Spain would not accept a policy of fait accompli.

== Operation Romeo-Sierra ==
On the morning of 18 July 2002, Spain launched Operation Romeo-Sierra to remove the Moroccan soldiers. The operation was carried out by Spanish special forces unit Grupo de Operaciones Especiales. Four Eurocopter Cougar helicopters that had taken off from Facinas landed 28 Spanish commandos on the island. The entire operation was coordinated by the Spanish Navy from the amphibious ship Castilla, on station at the Strait of Gibraltar. The Spanish Air Force deployed F-18 and Mirage F-1 fighters to provide air cover in case the Royal Moroccan Air Force attempted to intervene. The Spanish patrol boats Izaro and Laya came alongside the Moroccan gunboat El Lahiq, at anchor off the island, in order to prevent it from interfering with the operation. The boat's 20mm cannon was considered to be a significant threat by the Spanish forces. The boat's crew prepared their weapons and used their spotlight to try to blind Spanish pilots but did not otherwise obstruct the landing.

The Spanish forces were under orders to try to achieve their objective with zero casualties and their rules of engagement permitted them to use lethal force only if the Moroccans fired on them. The Moroccan marines present on the island did not offer any resistance and rapidly surrendered. One of them took cover behind a rock and aimed his rifle at the Spanish but chose to surrender peacefully rather than fire. Within a matter of minutes, all of six Moroccan servicemen were taken prisoner, and the island was secured. The prisoners were transported by helicopter to the headquarters of Civil Guard in Ceuta, from where they were transported to the Moroccan border. Over the course of the same day, the Spanish commandos on the island were replaced by soldiers of the Spanish Legion.

== Aftermath ==
The Spanish Legion troops on the island remained there after the operation was complete. The United States mediated the situation, that eventually returned to the status quo ante bellum. All Spanish troops were withdrawn, and the island remains unoccupied but claimed by both sides. BBC News interviewed Spanish citizens across Madrid after the conflict, and most people supported the intervention. Opposition politician Gaspar Llamazares of the United Left party said that Spain should not fall into the "provocation trap", so that it does not ruin its image in North Africa.

== See also ==
- Ceuta
- Melilla
- Morocco–Spain relations
- 2012 Peñón de Vélez de la Gomera incident
