= Perejil Island =

Uninhabited islet near Morocco

Disputed island Native name: Spanish: Isla de Perejil; Tarifit: Tura/Toṛa; Arabic: تورة; English: Parsley Island
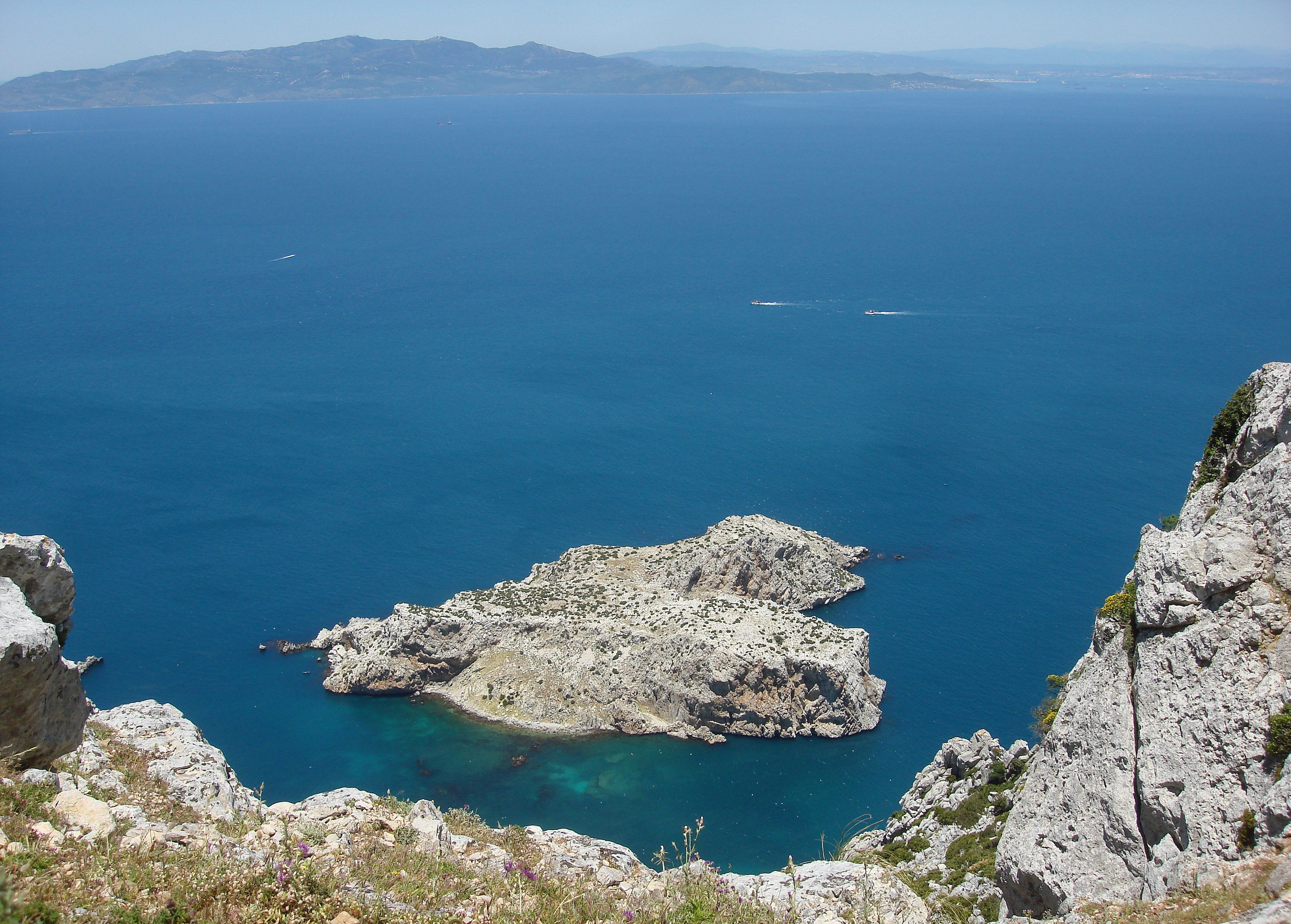
- View of Perejil Island from the Moroccan coast with the European shore of Spain on the horizon
- Interactive map of Perejil Island

Geography
- Location: Strait of Gibraltar
- Coordinates: 35°54′50″N 5°25′08″W
- Total islands: 1
- Area: 15 ha (37 acres)
- Highest point: 74 metres (243 ft)

Administration
- Spain

Claimed by
- Morocco

Demographics
- Population: 0

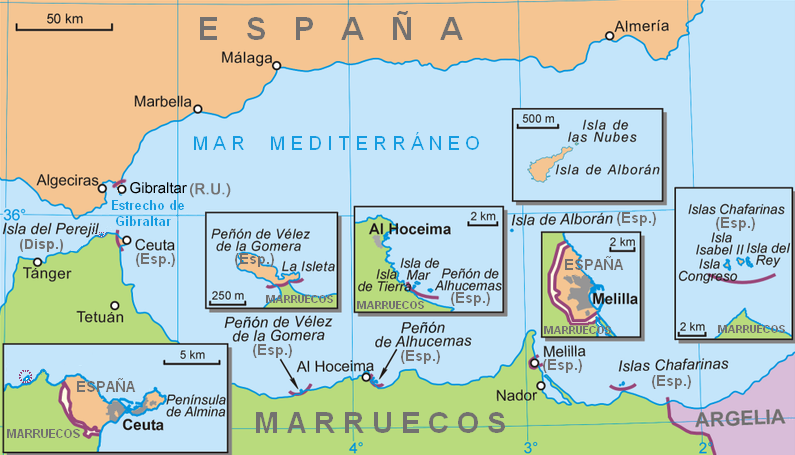
Spanish territories in North Africa

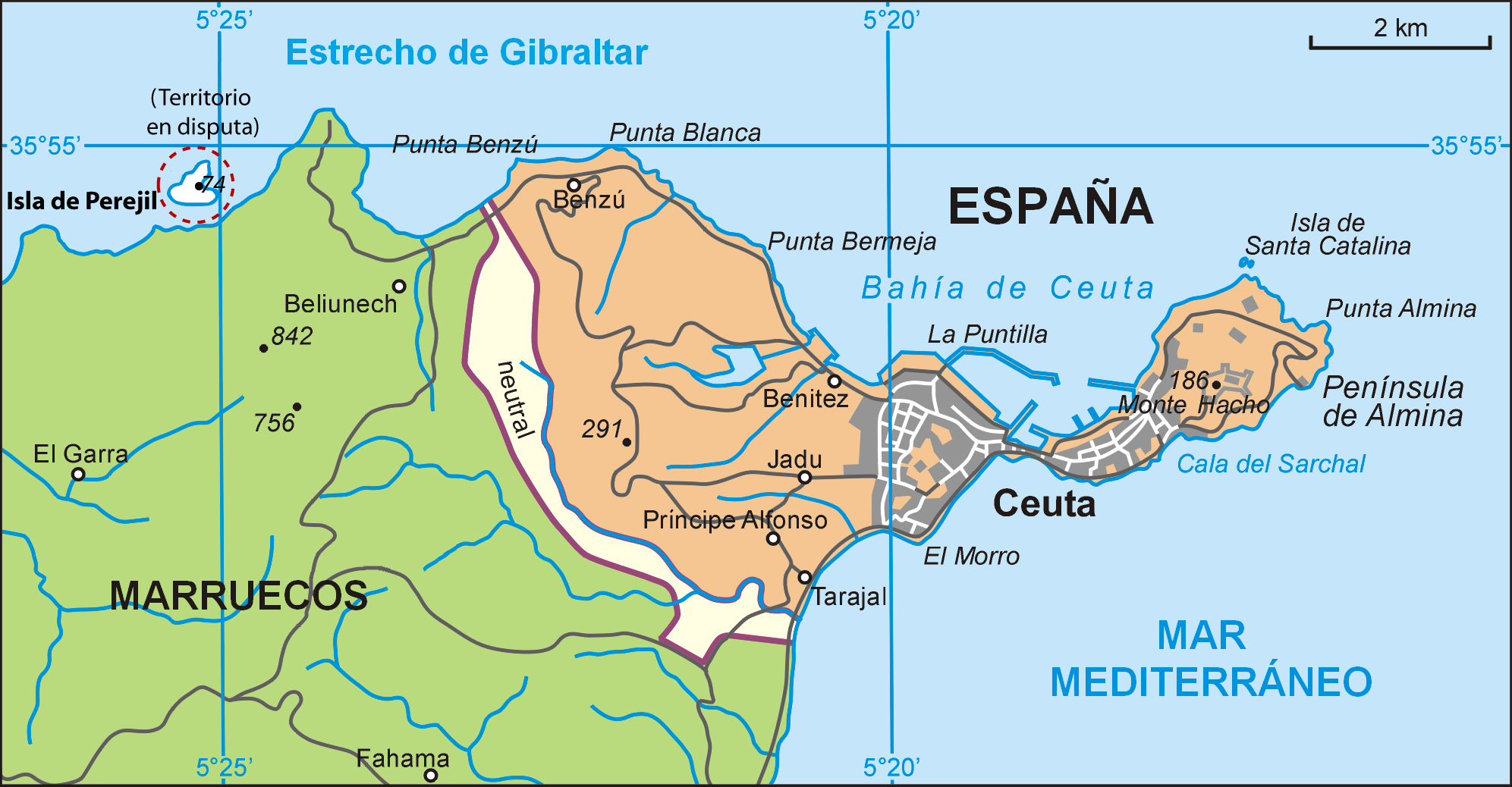
Isla de Perejil in relation to Ceuta

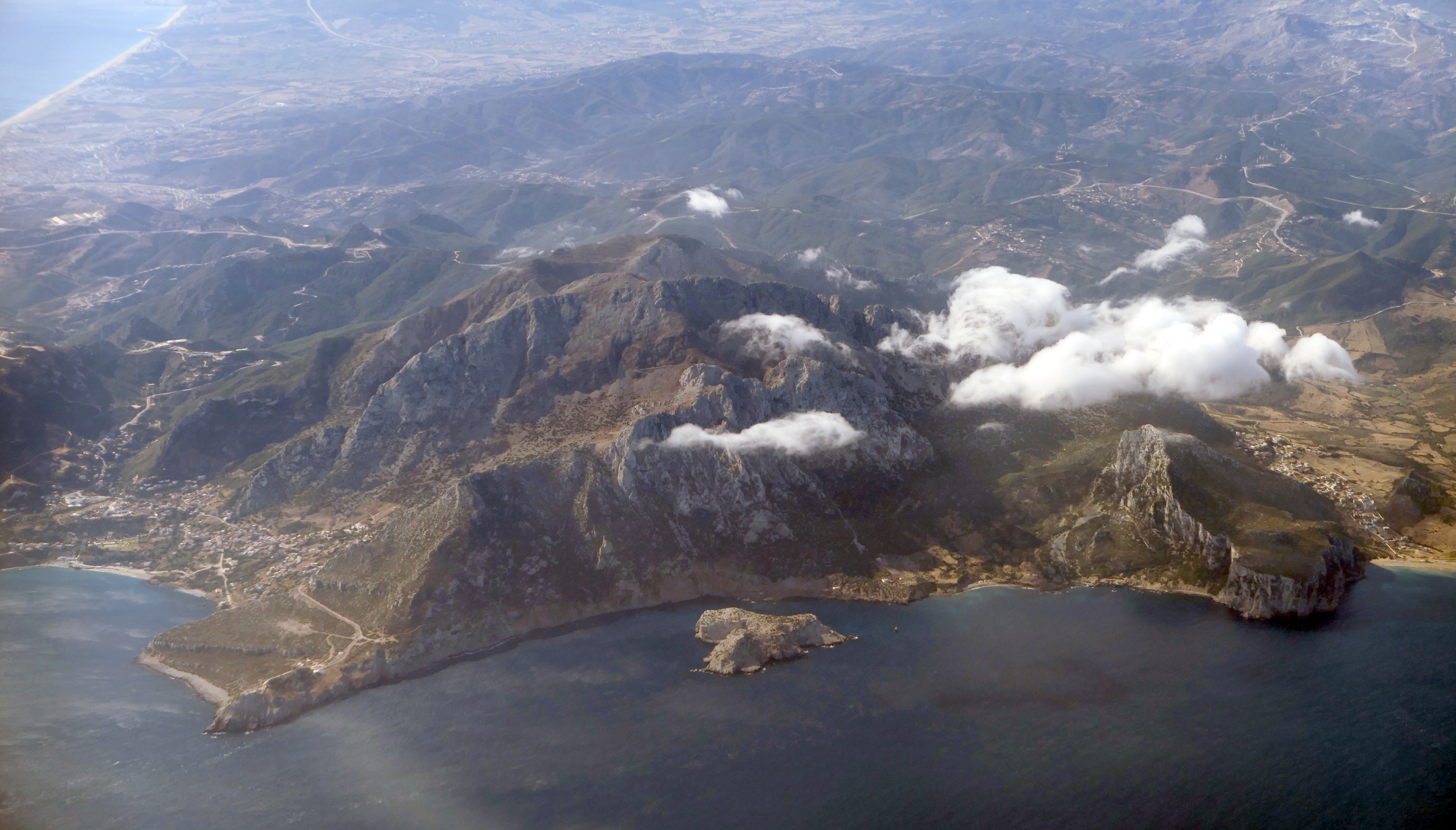
An aerial view of the island and the mainland

Perejil Island, (Note: Spanish: Isla de Perejil, Berber languages: Tura or Toṛa, Arabic: تورة, romanized: Tūra) also known as Parsley Island, is a small, uninhabited, rocky islet located approximately 250 metres (820 ft) off the coast of Morocco and about 6 km from the southern coast of Spain. Under Spanish sovereignty, it is administered by Spain as one of the plazas de soberanía, while its sovereignty is disputed by Morocco. It was the subject of an armed incident between the two countries in 2002.

== Name ==
The name Isla de Perejil literally means "Parsley Island" in Spanish. Its original Berber name is Tura, meaning "empty". It is sometimes referred to in Arabic as "Jazirat al-Ma'danus" (Arabic: جزيرة المعدنوس), which is a translation of "Parsley Island".

In Moroccan historical references, it is only known as "Tura". In his speech to the Moroccan people commemorating the "Throne Day" on 30 July 2002, the King of Morocco used the name "Tura" exclusively, when he mentioned the armed incident with Spain over the island.

== Geography ==
The island lies 250 metres (820 feet) off the coast of Morocco, 3 kilometres (2 miles) from the border of the territory of the Spanish city of Ceuta, 8 km (5.0 miles) to Ceuta itself and 13.5 km (8.4 miles) from mainland Spain. The island is about 480 by 480 metres (1,575 by 1,575 feet) in size, with an area of 15 ha or 0.15 square kilometres (0.06 sq mi). It has a maximum height of 74 metres (243 feet) above sea level.

== History ==
Perejil Island is shown as Spanish land in this 1907 map that predates the French-Spanish protectorate in Morocco.

V. Bérard identified Perejil with the mythical island of Ogygia where one of the daughters of Atlas, Calypso, detained Odysseus for seven years, according to the myth.

In 1415, Portugal, along with the reconquest of Ceuta (Part of the old Hispania Tangeriana), took possession of the nearby islet from the Marinid Sultanate, a predecessor to the current state of Morocco. In 1580, Portugal came under the sovereignty of Philip I of Portugal, who was also King of Spain, creating an Iberian Union under one king, without unifying the countries. When the Union split in 1640, Ceuta remained under Spanish sovereignty.

The islet's sovereignty is disputed by Morocco and Spain. Local Moroccan shepherds used it for grazing livestock, but the vast majority of Spaniards and Moroccans had not heard of the islet until 11 July 2002, when a group of Moroccan soldiers set up a base on the islet. The Moroccan government said that they set foot on the island in order to monitor illegal immigration, a justification the Spanish government rejected as there had been little co-operation on the matter at the time (a repeated source of complaint from Spain). After protests from the Spanish government, led by Prime Minister José María Aznar, Morocco replaced the soldiers with cadets from the Moroccan Navy, who then installed a fixed base on the island. This further angered the Spanish government and both countries restated their claims to the islet.

On the morning of 18 July 2002, Spain launched Operation Romeo-Sierra, a military attempt to take over the island. The operation was successful, and within hours the Spanish had taken control of the island and custody of the Moroccan naval cadets, who had not resisted the Spanish commando attack force, Grupo de Operaciones Especiales III. The operation was launched in conjunction with the Spanish Navy and Spanish Air Force. The Spanish transferred the captured Moroccans by helicopter to the headquarters of the Guardia Civil in Ceuta, who then transported the cadets to the Moroccan border. Over the course of the day, the Spanish Legion replaced the commandos and remained on the island until Morocco, after mediation by the United States, led by Colin Powell, agreed to return to the status quo ante which existed prior to the Moroccan occupation of the island. The islet is now deserted.

In June 2014, Spain requested that the Moroccan forces enter the island to expel sub-Saharan migrants.

== Sovereignty ==
Perejil Island has no permanent population. Goats are pastured there, and the Moroccan government expressed worries that smugglers and terrorists, in addition to illegal immigrants, were using the island. The island is well monitored from both sides in order to maintain the status quo that leaves it deserted and virtually a no man's land.

Morocco wants to control the Spanish cities Ceuta and Melilla along with several small rocks and islets off the coast of Morocco. The crisis over Perejil Island was seen by the Spanish government as a way for Morocco to test the waters in regard to Spain's will to defend Ceuta and Melilla.

== Popular culture ==
The international incident is recounted in a 2016 film, La Isla, which is largely based on the facts of the dispute.

== See also ==
- List of Spanish colonial wars in Morocco
- Spanish Morocco
