= Ras Kebdana =

Ras El Ma Qabuyawa Ras Kebdana رأس الماء ⵇⴰⴱⵓⵢⴰⵡⴰ
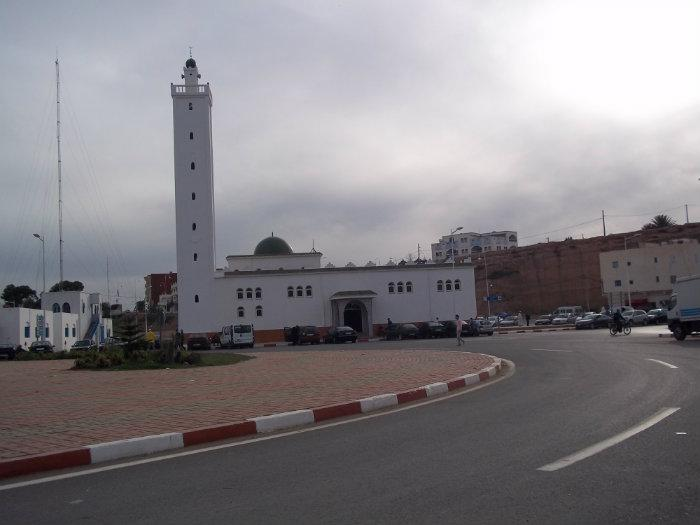
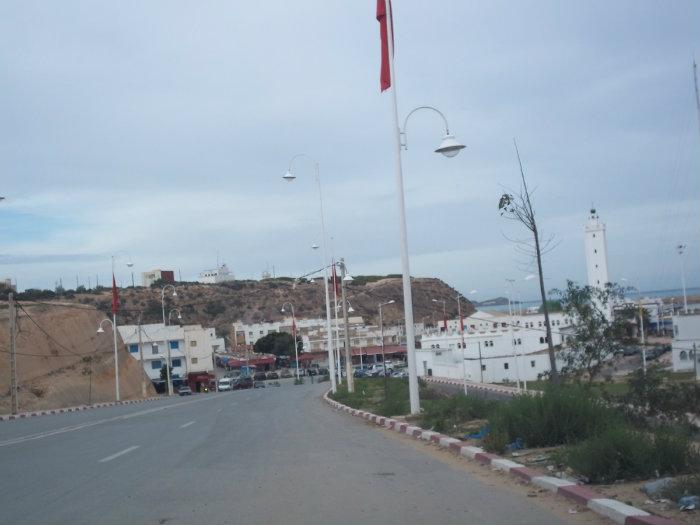
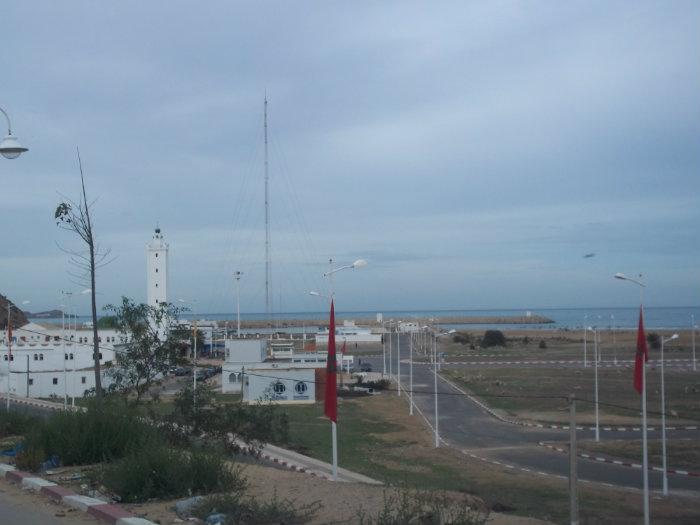
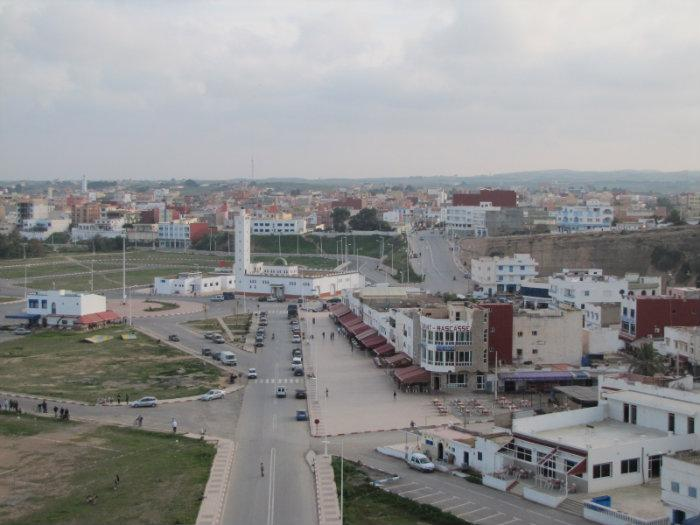
- View of Ras Kebdana with the mosque in the foreground

- Location in Morocco Ras El Ma (Africa)
- Coordinates: 35°08′N 2°25′W
- Country: Morocco
- Region: Oriental
- Province: Nador

Population (2024)
  - Total: 7,526
- Time zone: UTC+0 (GMT)

Ras Kebdana or Ras El Ma (Tarifit: Qabuyawa ⵇⴰⴱⵓⵢⴰⵡⴰ; Arabic: رأس الماء), also known as Qabuyawa, is a town in Nador Province, Oriental, Morocco. According to the 2024 census, it has a population of 7,526.

== History ==
The town was part of the Kingdom of Nekor around the 8th century AD.

== Economy ==
For centuries, the people of Ras Kebdana lived as self-sufficient farmers from agriculture, livestock farming and fishing, which is today the most important source of income. Tourism also plays a certain role, as the east is a 6-kilometer-long sandy beach, which is visited on the weekends by day-trippers from Nador and Oujda.

== Gallery ==
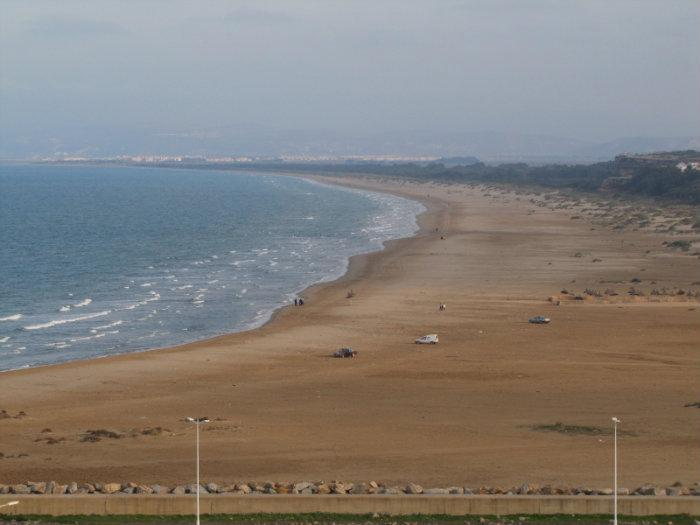
Panorama of Ras Kebdana beach
