= Isla del Congreso =

Island in the Mediterranean Sea

Coordinates: 35°10′44″N 2°26′29″W

Disputed island
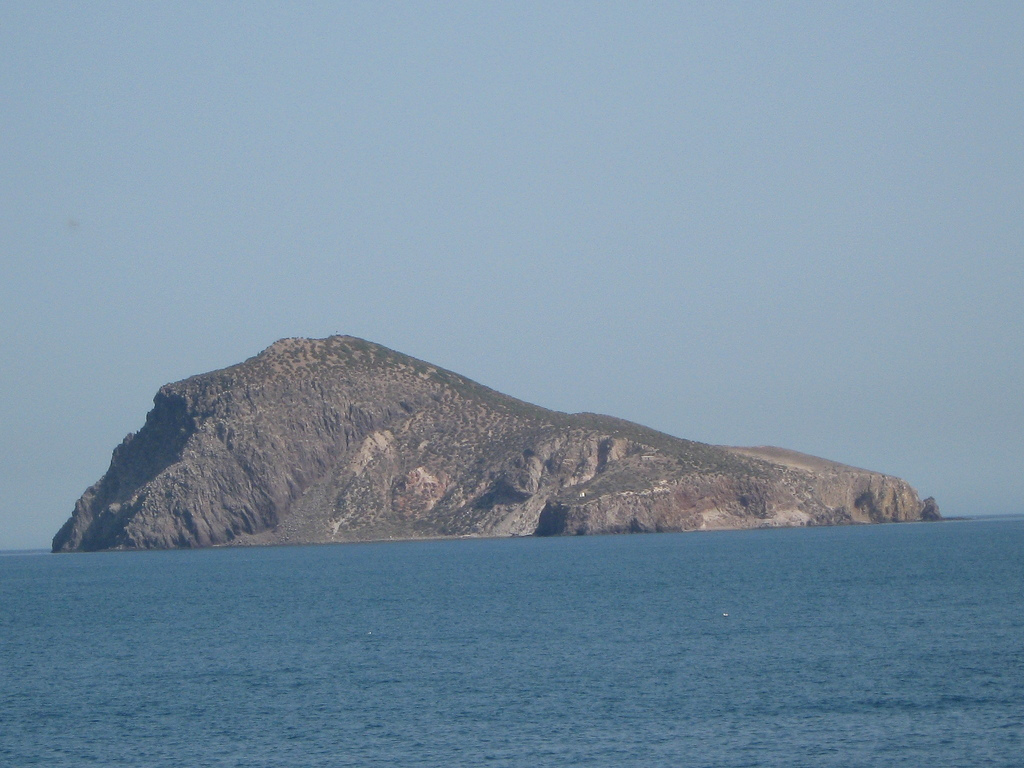
- Isla del Congreso as seen from Morocco
- Interactive map of Isla del Congreso

Geography
- Archipelago: Chafarinas Islands
- Adjacent to: Mediterranean Sea
- Area: 0.256 km^{2} (0.099 sq mi)
- Coastline: 3 km (1.9 mi)
- Highest elevation: 137 m (449 ft)

Administration
- Spain

Claimed by
- Morocco

Demographics
- Population: 0

The Isla del Congreso is a rock islet located as part of the Chafarinas Islands, an archipelago located on the Mediterranean Sea. It is located approximately four kilometres from the Moroccan shore. The island has an area of 0.256 km^{2}.

The island is a part of Spain's plazas de soberanía and is under Spanish administration, however it is also claimed by Morocco as part of its territory alongside other Spanish territories in Northern Africa.

== Geography ==
The island is uninhabited. It has some rabbits and a pigeon colony. The west coast is very inaccessible, with very steep cliffs, while the east coast is more accessible. The island is very rocky, with very little grass or plants. There is one navigable cave.
